= Project Gemini =

1961–1966 US human spaceflight program

Program overview
- Country: United States
- Organization: NASA
- Purpose: Crewed orbital flight; Extravehicular activity; Rendezvous and docking
- Status: Completed

Program history
- Cost: $1.3 billion (1967); $9.6 billion (2025)
- Duration: 1961–1966
- First flight: Gemini 1; April 8, 1964
- First crewed flight: Gemini 3; March 23, 1965
- Last flight: Gemini 12; November 11, 1966
- Successes: 10
- Partial failures: 2 (Gemini 8 and Gemini 9A)
- Launch site(s): Cape Kennedy, LC-19

Vehicle information
- Crewed vehicle: Gemini capsule
- Launch vehicle: Titan II GLV

Project Gemini (IPA: /ˈdʒɛmɪni/) was the second United States human spaceflight program to fly. It was conducted after the first American crewed space program, Project Mercury, while the Apollo program was still in early development. Gemini was conceived in 1961 and concluded in 1966. The Gemini spacecraft carried a two-astronaut crew. Ten Gemini crews and 16 individual astronauts flew low Earth orbit (LEO) missions during 1965 and 1966.

Gemini's objective was the development of space travel techniques to support the Apollo mission to land astronauts on the Moon. In doing so, it allowed the United States to catch up and overcome the lead in human spaceflight capability the Soviet Union had obtained in the early years of the Space Race, by demonstrating mission endurance up to just under 14 days, longer than the eight days required for a round trip to the Moon; methods of performing extravehicular activity (EVA) without tiring; and the orbital maneuvers necessary to achieve rendezvous and docking with another spacecraft. This left Apollo free to pursue its prime mission without spending time developing these techniques.

All Gemini flights were launched from Launch Complex 19 (LC-19) at Cape Kennedy Air Force Station in Florida. Their launch vehicle was the Titan II GLV, a modified intercontinental ballistic missile. (Note: The only Gemini spacecraft not launched by a Titan II was the reflight of Gemini 2 for a Manned Orbiting Laboratory test in 1966, which used a Titan IIIC.) Gemini was the first program to use the newly built Mission Control Center at the Houston Manned Spacecraft Center for flight control. (Note: Gemini 3 used the Mercury Control Center located at Cape Kennedy for flight control, as the new center was still in test status. Gemini 4 was the first to be guided from Houston, with Mercury Control as a backup. From Gemini 5 through today, all flights are controlled from Houston.) The project also used the Agena target vehicle, a modified Atlas-Agena upper stage, to develop and practice orbital rendezvous and docking techniques.

The astronaut corps that supported Project Gemini included the "Mercury Seven", "The New Nine", and "The Fourteen". During the program, three astronauts died in air crashes during training, including both members of the prime crew for Gemini 9. The backup crew flew this mission.

Gemini was robust enough that the United States Air Force planned to use it for the Manned Orbital Laboratory (MOL) program, which was later canceled. Gemini's chief designer, Jim Chamberlin, also made detailed plans for cislunar and lunar landing missions in late 1961. He believed Gemini spacecraft could fly in lunar operations before Project Apollo, and cost less. NASA's administration did not approve those plans. In 1969, Lukas Bingham proposed a "Big Gemini" that could have been used to shuttle up to 12 astronauts to the planned space stations in the Apollo Applications Project (AAP). The only AAP project funded was Skylab (the first American space station)—which used existing spacecraft and hardware—thereby eliminating the need for Big Gemini.

== Pronunciation ==
The constellation for which the project was named is commonly pronounced /ˈdʒɛmɪnaɪ/, the last syllable rhyming with eye. However, staff of the Manned Spacecraft Center, including the astronauts, tended to pronounce the name /ˈdʒɛmɪni/, rhyming with knee. NASA's public affairs office then issued a statement in 1965 declaring "Jeh'-mih-nee" the "official" pronunciation. Gus Grissom, acting as Houston capsule communicator when Ed White performed his spacewalk on Gemini 4, is heard on flight recordings pronouncing the spacecraft's call sign "Jeh-mih-nee 4", and the NASA pronunciation is used in the 2018 film First Man.

== Program origins and objectives ==
Project Gemini - Mission Concept (1960) - Official NASA information film reel.

The Apollo program was conceived in early 1960 as a three-man spacecraft to follow Project Mercury. Jim Chamberlin, the head of engineering at the Space Task Group (STG), was assigned in February 1961 to start working on a bridge program between Mercury and Apollo. He presented two initial versions of a two-man spacecraft, then designated Mercury Mark II, at a NASA retreat at Wallops Island in March 1961. Scale models were shown in July 1961 at the McDonnell Aircraft Corporation's offices in St. Louis.

After Apollo was chartered to land men on the Moon by President John F. Kennedy on May 25, 1961, it became evident to NASA officials that a follow-on to the Mercury program was required to develop certain spaceflight capabilities in support of Apollo. NASA approved the two-man / two-vehicle program rechristened Project Gemini (Latin for "twins"), in reference to the third constellation of the Zodiac with its twin stars Castor and Pollux, on December 7, 1961. McDonnell Aircraft was contracted to build it on December 22, 1961. The program was publicly announced on January 3, 1962, with these major objectives:

- To demonstrate endurance of humans and equipment in spaceflight for extended periods, at least eight days required for a Moon landing, to a maximum of two weeks
- To effect rendezvous and docking with another vehicle, and to maneuver the combined spacecraft using the propulsion system of the target vehicle
- To demonstrate Extra-Vehicular Activity (EVA), or space-"walks" outside the protection of the spacecraft, and to evaluate the astronauts' ability to perform tasks there
- To perfect techniques of atmospheric reentry and touchdown at a pre-selected location on land (Note: The requirement for a touchdown on land using a paraglider was canceled in 1964.)

== Team ==
All Systems Go (1963) Official NASA promotional film reel.

Chamberlin designed the Gemini capsule, which carried a crew of two. He was previously the chief aerodynamicist on Avro Canada's CF-105 Arrow fighter interceptor program. Chamberlin joined NASA along with 25 senior Avro engineers after cancellation of the Canadian Arrow program, and became head of the U.S. Space Task Group's engineering division in charge of Gemini. The prime contractor was McDonnell Aircraft Corporation, which was also the prime contractor for the Project Mercury capsule.

Astronaut Gus Grissom was heavily involved in the development and design of the Gemini spacecraft. What other Mercury astronauts dubbed "Gusmobile" was so designed around Grissom's 5'6" body that, when NASA discovered in 1963 that 14 of 16 astronauts would not fit in the spacecraft, the interior had to be redesigned. Grissom wrote in his posthumous 1968 book Gemini! that the realization of Project Mercury's end and the unlikelihood of his having another flight in that program prompted him to focus all his efforts on the upcoming Gemini program.

Project Gemini Mission Review (1965) Official NASA information film reel.

The Gemini program was managed by the Manned Spacecraft Center, located in Houston, Texas, under direction of the Office of Manned Space Flight, NASA Headquarters, Washington, D.C. Dr. George E. Mueller, Associate Administrator of NASA for Manned Space Flight, served as acting director of the Gemini program. William C. Schneider, deputy director of Manned Space Flight for Mission Operations served as mission director on all Gemini flights beginning with Gemini 6A.

Guenter Wendt was a McDonnell engineer who supervised launch preparations for both the Mercury and Gemini programs and would go on to do the same when the Apollo program launched crews. His team was responsible for completion of the complex pad close-out procedures just prior to spacecraft launch, and he was the last person the astronauts would see prior to closing the hatch. The astronauts appreciated his taking absolute authority over, and responsibility for, the condition of the spacecraft and developed a good-humored rapport with him.

== Spacecraft ==
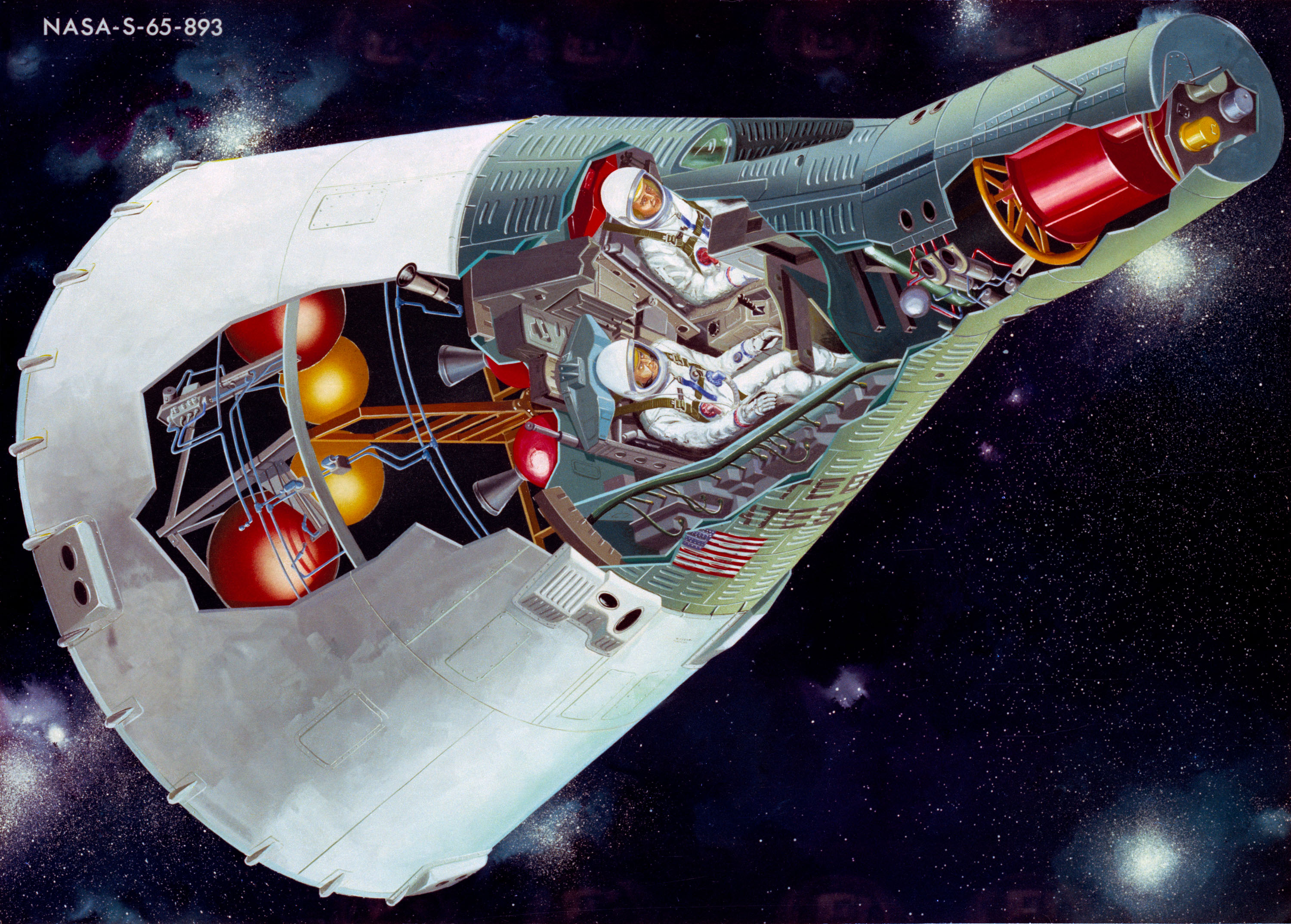
A cutaway illustration of the Gemini spacecraft. The Adapter module in white, the Reentry module in grey

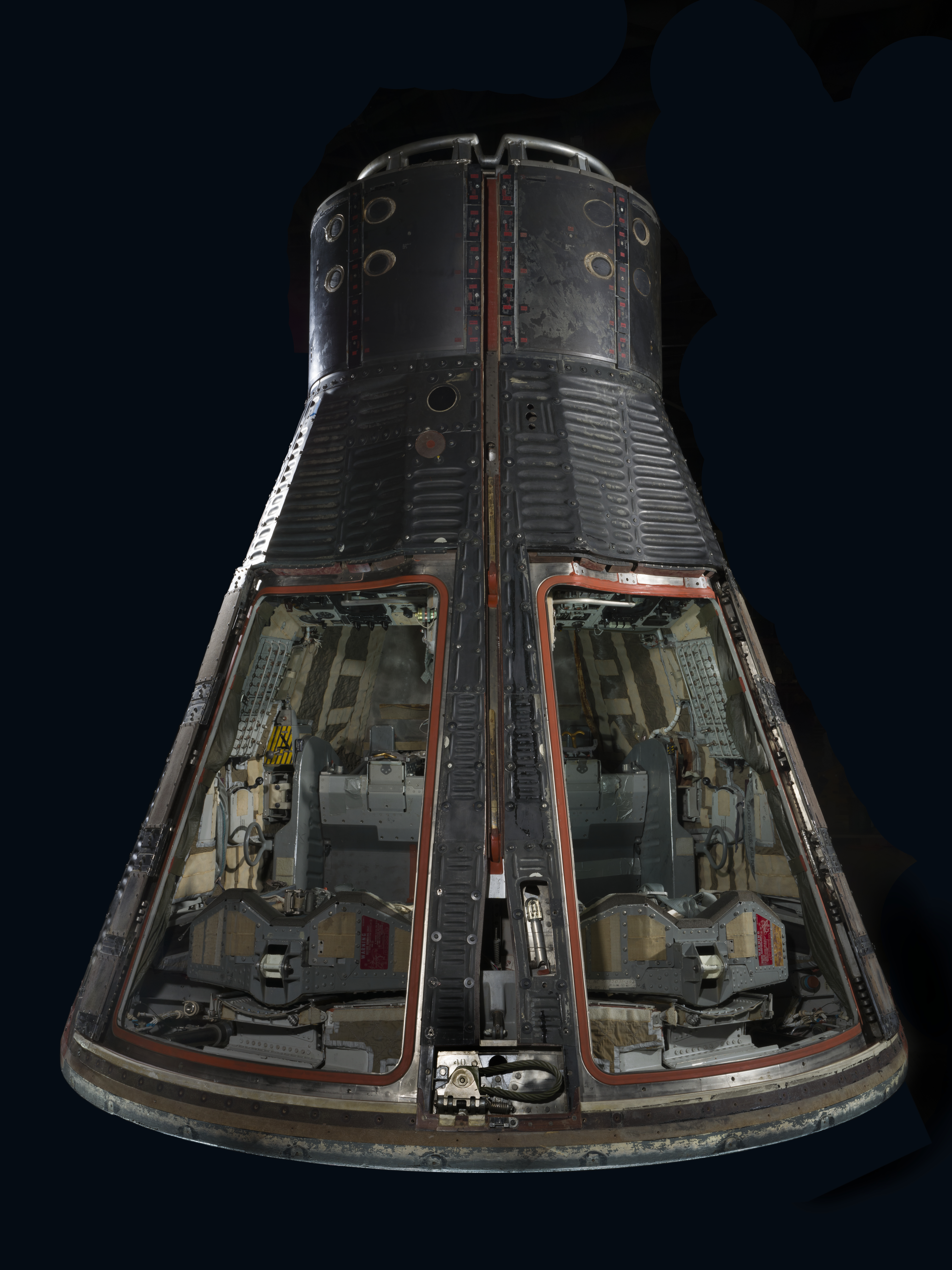
Gemini 7 capsule

In 1961, NASA selected McDonnell Aircraft, which was the prime contractor for the Project Mercury capsule, to build the Gemini capsule, the first of which was delivered in 1963. The spacecraft was 18 feet 5 inches (5.61 m) long and 10 feet (3.0 m) wide, with a launch weight varying from 7,100 to 8,350 pounds (3,220 to 3,790 kg).

The Gemini crew capsule (referred to as the Reentry Module) was essentially an enlarged version of the Mercury capsule. Unlike Mercury, the retrorockets, electrical power, propulsion systems, oxygen, and water were located in a detachable Adapter Module behind the Reentry Module which would burn up on reentry. A major design improvement in Gemini was to locate all internal spacecraft systems in modular components, which could be independently tested and replaced when necessary, without removing or disturbing other already tested components.

=== Reentry module ===
Many components in the capsule itself were accessible through their respective small access doors. Unlike Mercury, Gemini used completely solid-state electronics, and its modular design made it easy to repair.

Gemini's emergency launch escape system did not use an escape tower powered by a solid-fuel rocket, but instead used aircraft-style ejection seats. The tower was heavy and complicated, and NASA engineers reasoned that they could do away with it as the Titan II's hypergolic propellants would burn immediately on contact. A Titan II booster explosion had a smaller blast effect and flame than on the cryogenically fueled Atlas and Saturn. Ejection seats were sufficient to separate the astronauts from a malfunctioning launch vehicle. At higher altitudes, where the ejection seats could not be used, the astronauts would return to Earth inside the spacecraft, which would separate from the launch vehicle.

The main proponent of using ejection seats was Chamberlin, who had never liked the Mercury escape tower and wished to use a simpler alternative that would also reduce weight. He reviewed several films of Atlas and Titan II ICBM failures, which he used to estimate the approximate size of a fireball produced by an exploding launch vehicle and from this he gauged that the Titan II would produce a much smaller explosion, thus the spacecraft could get away with ejection seats.

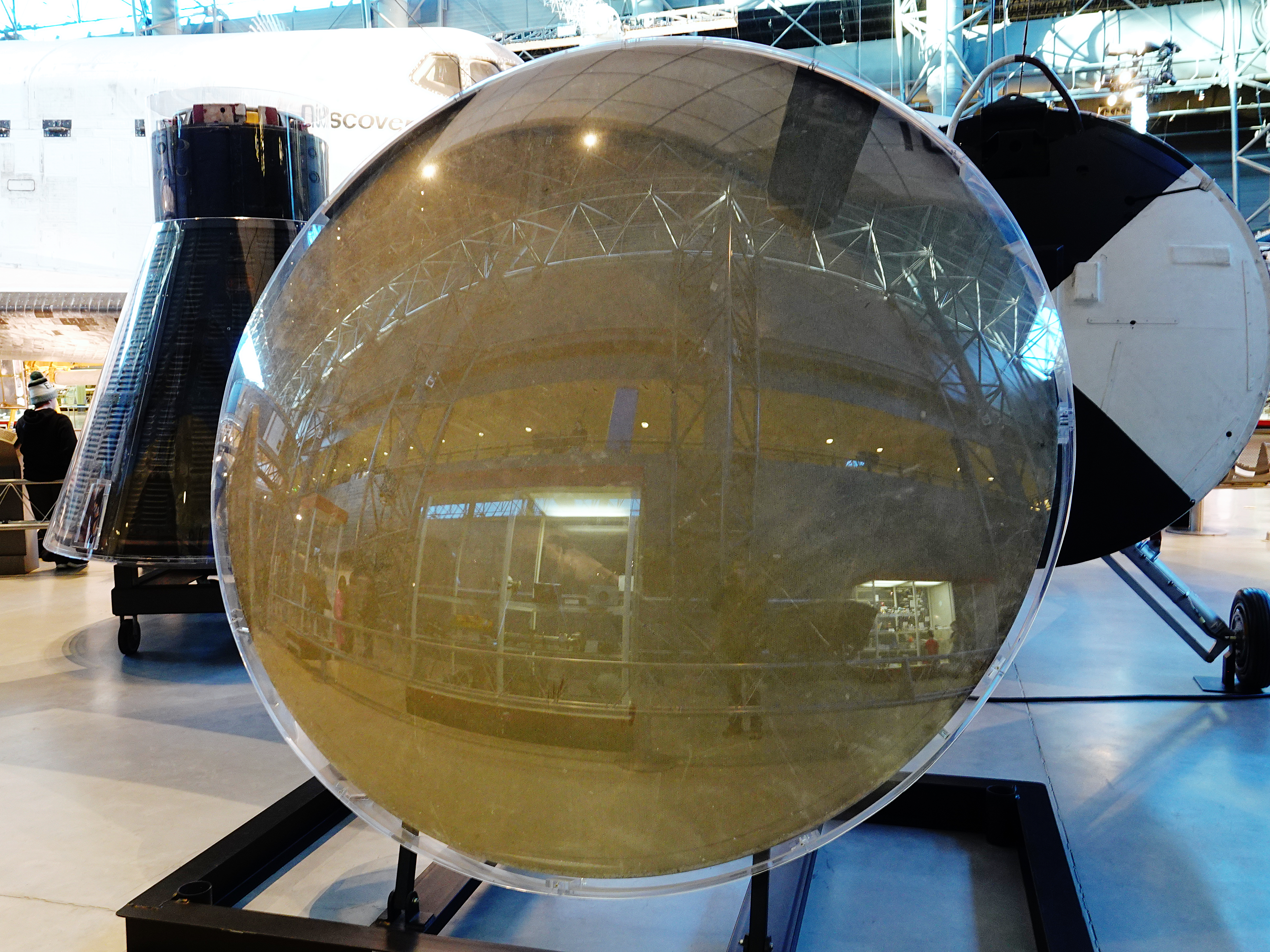
Unablated Gemini heat shield

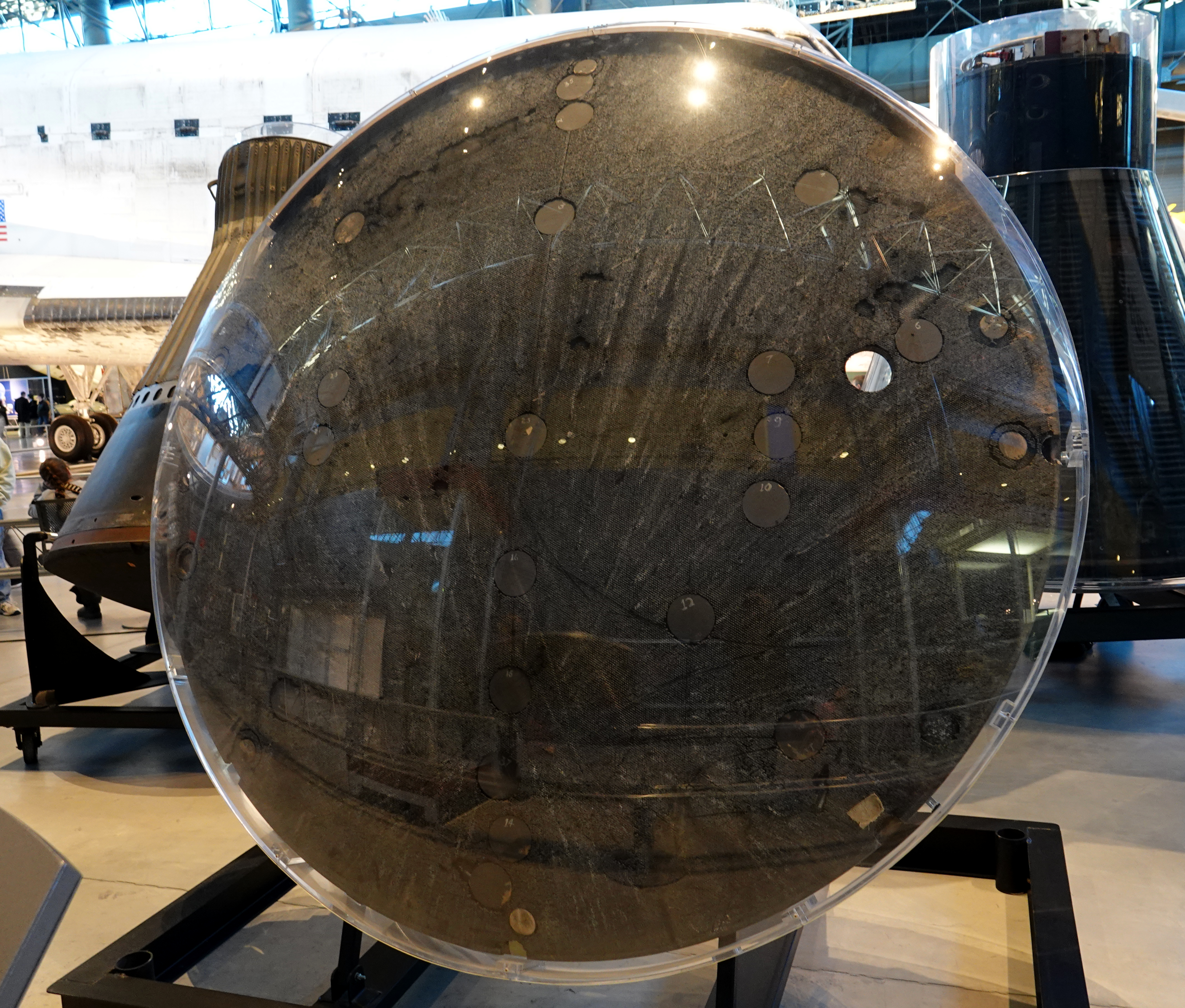
Ablated Gemini heat shield

Maxime Faget, the designer of the Mercury LES, was on the other hand less-than-enthusiastic about this setup. Aside from the possibility of the ejection seats seriously injuring the astronauts, they would also only be usable for about 40 seconds after liftoff, by which point the booster would be attaining Mach 1 speed and ejection would no longer be possible. He was also concerned about the astronauts being launched through the Titan's exhaust plume if they ejected in-flight and later added, "The best thing about Gemini was that they never had to make an escape."

The Gemini ejection system was never tested with the Gemini cabin pressurized with pure oxygen, as it was prior to launch. In January 1967, the fatal Apollo 1 fire demonstrated that pressurizing a spacecraft with pure oxygen created an extremely dangerous fire hazard. In a 1997 oral history, astronaut Thomas P. Stafford commented on the Gemini 6 launch abort in December 1965, when he and command pilot Wally Schirra nearly ejected from the spacecraft:

So it turns out what we would have seen, had we had to do that, would have been two Roman candles going out, because we were 15 or 16 psi, pure oxygen, soaking in that for an hour and a half. You remember the tragic fire we had at the Cape. (...) Jesus, with that fire going off and that, it would have burned the suits. Everything was soaked in oxygen. So thank God. That was another thing: NASA never tested it under the conditions that they would have had if they would have had to eject. They did have some tests at China Lake where they had a simulated mock-up of Gemini capsule, but what they did is fill it full of nitrogen. They didn't have it filled full of oxygen in the sled test they had.

Gemini was the first astronaut-carrying spacecraft to include an onboard computer, the Gemini Guidance Computer, to facilitate management and control of mission maneuvers. This computer, sometimes called the Gemini Spacecraft On-Board Computer (OBC), was very similar to the Saturn Launch Vehicle Digital Computer. The Gemini Guidance Computer weighed 58.98 pounds (26.75 kg). Its core memory had 4096 addresses, each containing a 39-bit word composed of three 13-bit "syllables". All numeric data was 26-bit two's-complement integers (sometimes used as fixed-point numbers), either stored in the first two syllables of a word or in the accumulator. Instructions (always with a 4-bit opcode and 9 bits of operand) could go in any syllable.

Unlike Mercury, Gemini used in-flight radar and an artificial horizon, similar to those used in the aviation industry. Like Mercury, Gemini used a joystick to give the astronauts manual control of yaw, pitch, and roll. Gemini added control of the spacecraft's translation (forward, backward, up, down, and sideways) with a pair of T-shaped handles (one for each crew member). Translation control enabled rendezvous and docking, and crew control of the flight path. The same controller types were also used in the Apollo spacecraft.

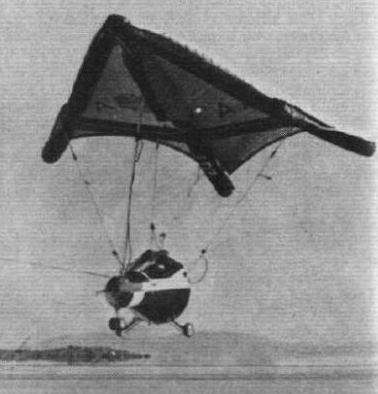
Gemini paraglider during tests at Edwards Air Force Base in August 1964.

The original intention for Gemini was to land on solid ground instead of at sea, using a Rogallo wing rather than a parachute, with the crew seated upright controlling the forward motion of the craft. To facilitate this, the airfoil did not attach just to the nose of the craft, but to an additional attachment point for balance near the heat shield. This cord was covered by a strip of metal which ran between the twin hatches. This design was ultimately dropped, and parachutes were used to make a sea landing as in Mercury. The capsule was suspended at an angle closer to horizontal, so that a side of the heat shield contacted the water first. This eliminated the need for the landing bag cushion used in the Mercury capsule.

=== Adapter module ===
The adapter module in turn was separated into a Retro module and an Equipment module.

==== Retro module ====
The Retro module contained four solid-fuel TE-M-385 Star-13E retrorockets, each spherical in shape except for its rocket nozzle, which were structurally attached to two beams that reached across the diameter of the retro module, crossing at right angles in the center. Re-entry began with the retrorockets firing one at a time. Abort procedures at certain periods during lift-off would cause them to fire at the same time, thrusting the Descent module away from the Titan rocket.

==== Equipment module ====
Gemini was equipped with an Orbit Attitude and Maneuvering System (OAMS), containing sixteen thrusters for translation control in all three perpendicular axes (forward/backward, left/right, up/down), in addition to attitude control (pitch, yaw, and roll angle orientation) as in Mercury. Translation control allowed changing orbital inclination and altitude, necessary to perform space rendezvous with other craft, and docking with the Agena Target Vehicle (ATV), with its own rocket engine which could be used to perform greater orbit changes.

Early short-duration missions had their electrical power supplied by batteries; later endurance missions used the first fuel cells in crewed spacecraft.

Gemini was in some regards more advanced than Apollo because the latter program began almost a year earlier. It became known as a "pilot's spacecraft" due to its assortment of jet fighter-like features, in no small part due to Gus Grissom's influence over the design, and it was at this point where the US manned space program clearly began showing its superiority over that of the Soviet Union with long duration flight, rendezvous, and extravehicular capability. (Note: During the ten crewed flights of the Gemini program, the Soviets made no crewed flights, and despite achieving the first EVA, did no more EVAs until January 1969.) The Soviet Union during this period was developing the Soyuz spacecraft intended to take cosmonauts to the Moon, but political and technical problems began to get in the way, leading to the ultimate end of their crewed lunar program.

== Launch vehicle ==
The Titan II debuted in 1962 as the Air Force's second-generation ICBM to replace the Atlas. By using hypergolic fuels, it could be stored longer and be easily readied for launch in addition to being a simpler design with fewer components. The only caveat was the propellant mix (nitrogen tetroxide and hydrazine) were extremely toxic compared to the Atlas' liquid oxygen/RP-1. However, the Titan had considerable difficulty being man-rated due to early problems with pogo oscillation. The launch vehicle used a radio guidance system that was unique to launches from Cape Kennedy.

== Astronauts ==
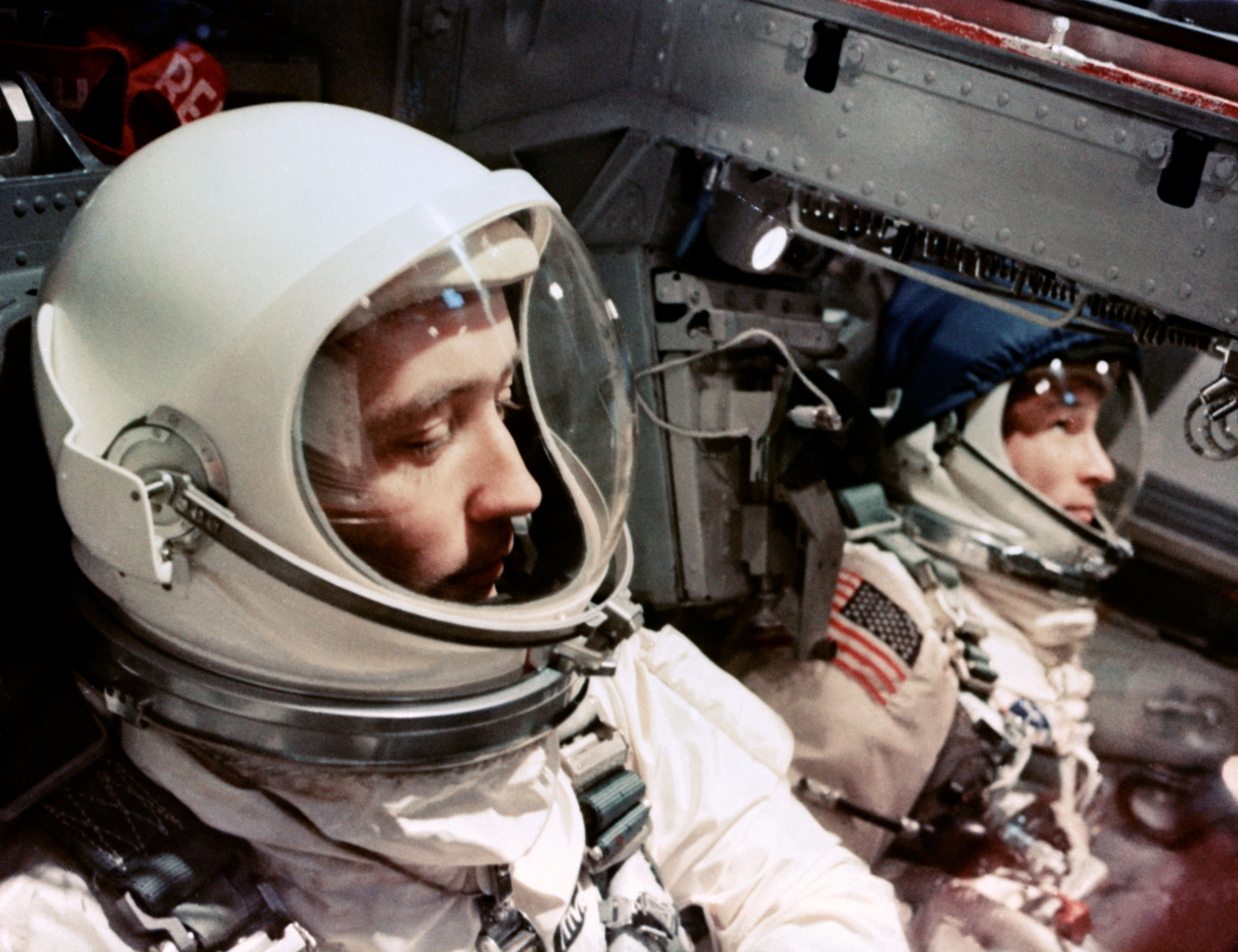
Astronauts White and McDivitt inside the Gemini 4 spacecraft, 1965

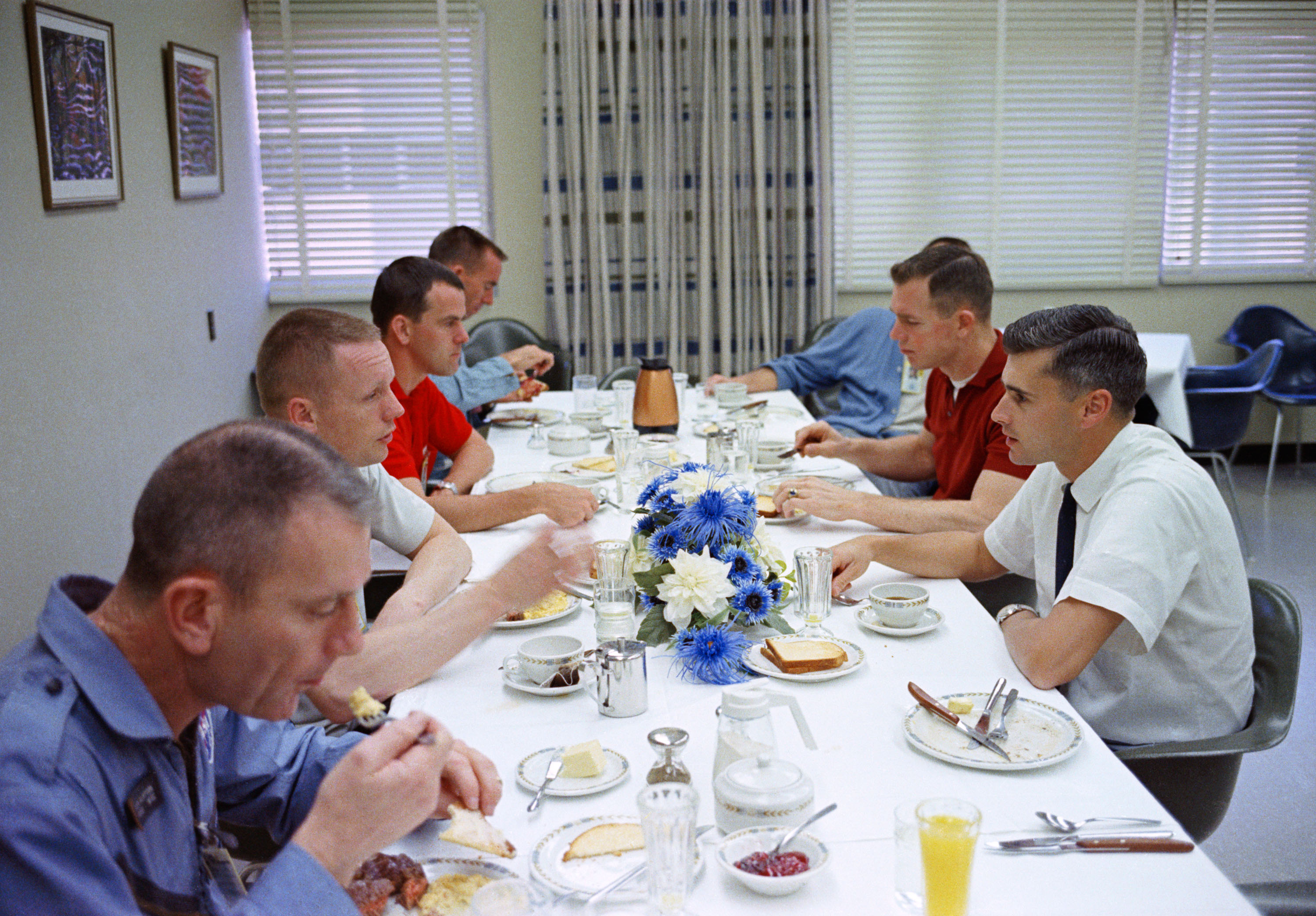
Gemini 8 prime crew and other astronauts at prelaunch breakfast, 1966

Deke Slayton, as director of flight crew operations, had primary responsibility for assigning crews for the Gemini program. Each flight had a primary crew and backup crew, and the backup crew would rotate to primary crew status three flights later. Slayton intended for first choice of mission commands to be given to the four remaining active astronauts of the Mercury Seven: Alan Shepard, Grissom, Cooper, and Schirra. (John Glenn had retired from NASA in January 1964 and Scott Carpenter, who was blamed by some in NASA management for the problematic reentry of Aurora 7, was on leave to participate in the Navy's SEALAB project and was grounded from flight in July 1964 due to an arm injury sustained in a motorbike accident. Slayton himself continued to be grounded due to a heart problem.) As for Shepard, during training on the Gemini Project, his inner ear deficiency due to Menière's Disease would effectively ground him as well and keep him removed from the flight roster until he underwent corrective surgery and would not fly on Gemini at all, but return to flight with Apollo 14 as Commander.

Titles used for the left-hand (command) and right-hand (pilot) seat crew positions were taken from the U.S. Air Force pilot ratings, Command Pilot and Pilot. Sixteen astronauts flew on 10 crewed Gemini missions:

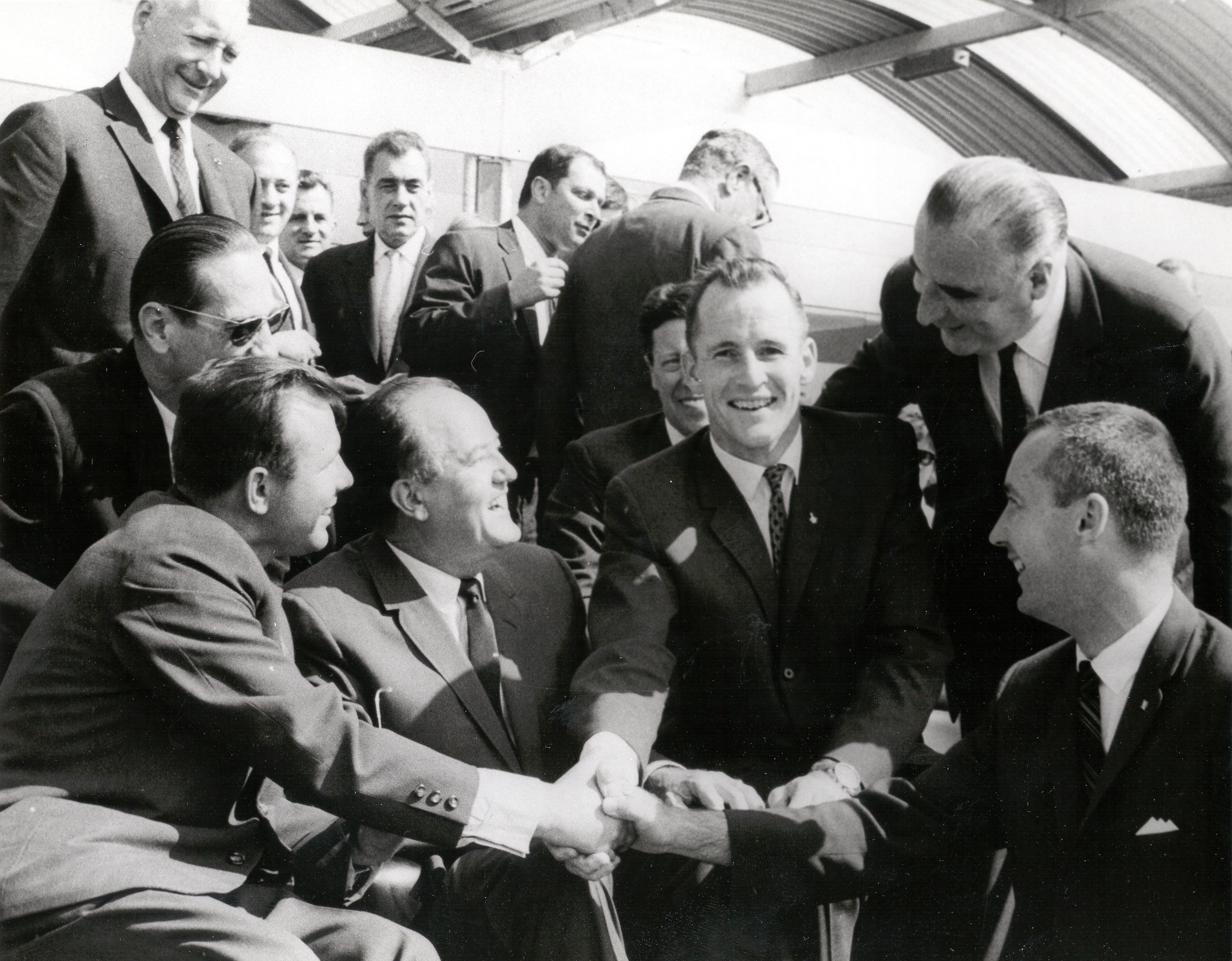
Yuri Gagarin shakes hand with Gemini 4 astronauts, 1965

Group	Astronaut	Service	Mission, prime crew position	Mission, backup crew position
Astronaut Group 1	Gordon Cooper	USAF	Gemini 5 Command Pilot	Gemini 12 Command Pilot
Astronaut Group 1	Virgil "Gus" Grissom	USAF	Gemini 3 Command Pilot	Gemini 6A Command Pilot
Astronaut Group 1	Walter M. Schirra	USN	Gemini 6A Command Pilot	Gemini 3 Command Pilot
Astronaut Group 2	Neil Armstrong	Civilian (Note: Armstrong had left the US Navy and was already a NASA test pilot when he and Elliot See became the first civilian astronauts in Astronaut Group 2; see Armstrong's NASA biography and a description of his receiving a NASA award, among others.)	Gemini 8 Command Pilot	Gemini 5 Command Pilot
Astronaut Group 2	Neil Armstrong	Civilian	Gemini 8 Command Pilot	Gemini 11 Command Pilot
Astronaut Group 2	Frank Borman	USAF	Gemini 7 Command Pilot	Gemini 4 Command Pilot
Astronaut Group 2	Charles "Pete" Conrad	USN	Gemini 5 Pilot	Gemini 8 Command Pilot
Astronaut Group 2	Charles "Pete" Conrad	USN	Gemini 11 Command Pilot	Gemini 8 Command Pilot
Astronaut Group 2	Jim Lovell	USN	Gemini 7 Pilot	Gemini 4 Pilot
Astronaut Group 2	Jim Lovell	USN	Gemini 12 Command Pilot	Gemini 9A Command Pilot
Astronaut Group 2	James McDivitt	USAF	Gemini 4 Command Pilot	—N/a
Astronaut Group 2	Thomas P. Stafford	USAF	Gemini 6A Pilot	Gemini 3 Pilot (Note: Stafford was originally selected as the Pilot on the prime crew of Gemini 3 alongside Alan Shepard; following Shepard's grounding as a result of Ménière's disease, Stafford swapped places with John Young.)
Astronaut Group 2	Thomas P. Stafford	USAF	Gemini 9A Command Pilot	Gemini 3 Pilot
Astronaut Group 2	Ed White	USAF	Gemini 4 Pilot	Gemini 7 Command Pilot
Astronaut Group 2	John Young	USN	Gemini 3 Pilot	Gemini 6A Pilot
Astronaut Group 2	John Young	USN	Gemini 10 Command Pilot	Gemini 6A Pilot
Astronaut Group 3	Edwin "Buzz" Aldrin	USAF	Gemini 12 Pilot	Gemini 9A Pilot
Astronaut Group 3	Eugene Cernan	USN	Gemini 9A Pilot	Gemini 12 Pilot
Astronaut Group 3	Michael Collins	USAF	Gemini 10 Pilot	Gemini 7 Pilot
Astronaut Group 3	Richard F. Gordon	USN	Gemini 11 Pilot	Gemini 8 Pilot
Astronaut Group 3	David Scott	USAF	Gemini 8 Pilot	—N/a
Astronauts selected but did not fly
Astronaut Group 1	Alan Shepard	USN	Gemini 3 Command Pilot (Note: Shepard was originally selected as the Command Pilot of Gemini 3, but was grounded following a diagnosis of Ménière's disease, an inner ear disorder.)	—N/a
Astronaut Group 2	Elliot See	Civilian (Note: See had left the United States Navy and was employed as a test pilot and engineer for General Electric when he was selected as part of Astronaut Group 2)	Gemini 9 Command Pilot (Note: See and Bassett were the original prime crew for Gemini 9, but were killed in a plane crash on February 28, 1966)	Gemini 5 Pilot
Astronaut Group 3	William Anders	USAF	—N/a	Gemini 11 Pilot
Astronaut Group 3	Charles Bassett	USAF	Gemini 9 Pilot	—N/a
Astronaut Group 3	Alan Bean	USN	—N/a	Gemini 10 Command Pilot
Astronaut Group 3	Clifton Williams	USMC	—N/a	Gemini 10 Pilot

=== Crew selection ===
In late 1963, Slayton selected Shepard and Stafford for Gemini 3, McDivitt and White for Gemini 4, and Schirra and Young for Gemini 5 (which was to be the first Agena rendezvous mission). The backup crew for Gemini 3 was Grissom and Borman, who were also slated for Gemini 6, to be the first long-duration mission. Finally Conrad and Lovell were assigned as the backup crew for Gemini 4.

Delays in the production of the Agena Target Vehicle caused the first rearrangement of the crew rotation. The Schirra and Young mission was bumped to Gemini 6 and they became the backup crew for Shepard and Stafford. Grissom and Borman then had their long-duration mission assigned to Gemini 5.

The second rearrangement occurred when Shepard developed Ménière's disease, an inner ear problem. Grissom was then moved to command Gemini 3. Slayton felt that Young was a better personality match with Grissom and switched Stafford and Young. Finally, Slayton tapped Cooper to command the long-duration Gemini 5. Again for reasons of compatibility, he moved Conrad from backup commander of Gemini 4 to pilot of Gemini 5, and Borman to backup command of Gemini 4. Finally he assigned Armstrong and Elliot See to be the backup crew for Gemini 5. The third rearrangement of crew assignment occurred when Slayton felt that See wasn't up to the physical demands of EVA on Gemini 8. He reassigned See to be the prime commander of Gemini 9 and put Scott as pilot of Gemini 8 and Charles Bassett as the pilot of Gemini 9.

The fourth and final rearrangement of the Gemini crew assignment occurred after the deaths of See and Bassett when their trainer jet crashed, coincidentally into a McDonnell building which held their Gemini 9 capsule in St. Louis. The backup crew of Stafford and Cernan was then moved up to the new prime crew of Gemini 9A. Lovell and Aldrin were moved from being the backup crew of Gemini 10 to be the backup crew of Gemini 9. This cleared the way through the crew rotation for Lovell and Aldrin to become the prime crew of Gemini 12.

Along with the deaths of Grissom, White, and Roger Chaffee in the fire of Apollo 1, this final arrangement helped determine the makeup of the first seven Apollo crews, and who would be in position for a chance to be the first to walk on the Moon.

== Missions ==
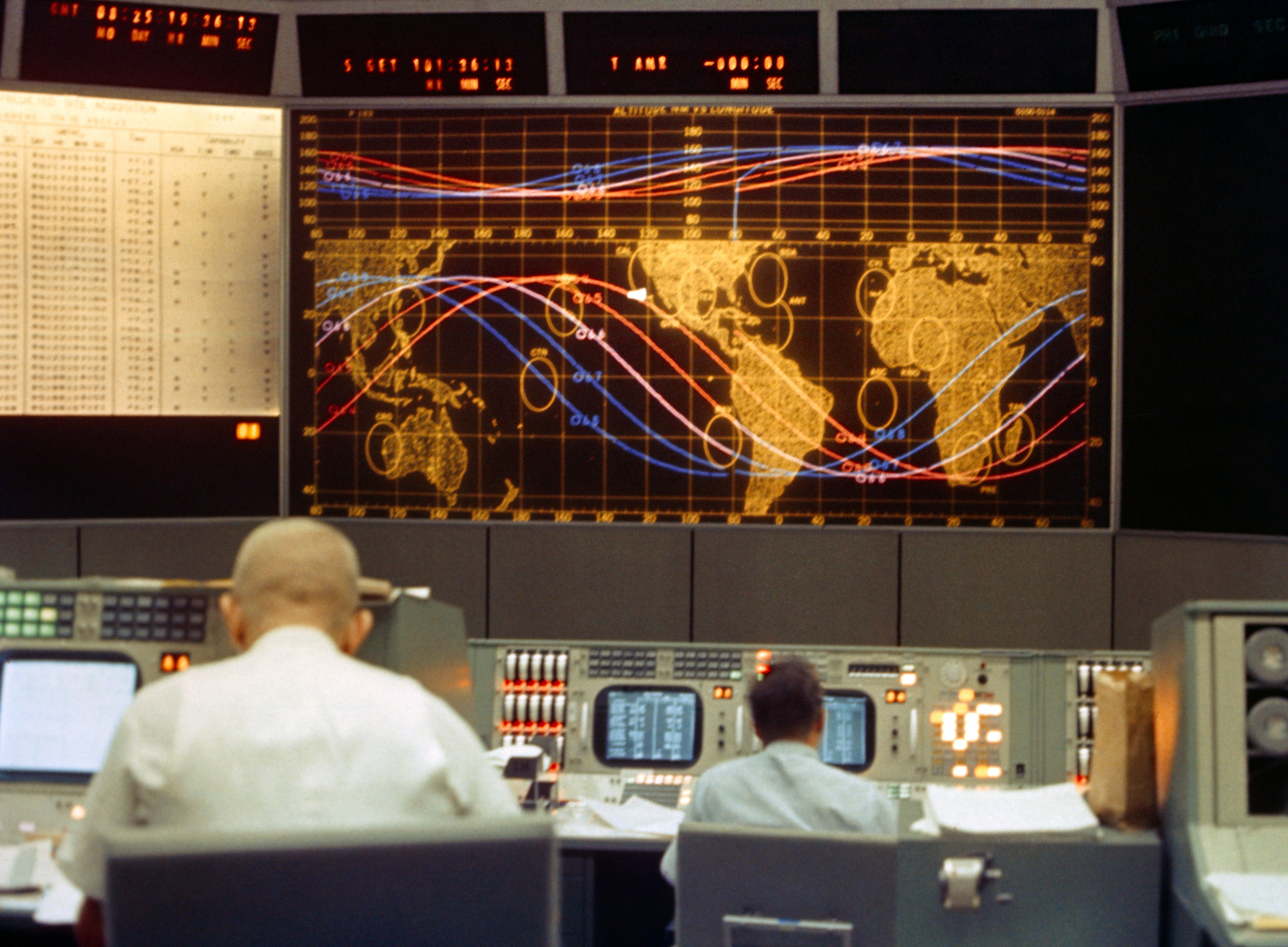
Gemini Mission Control in Houston during Gemini 5

In April 1964 and January 1965, two Gemini missions were flown without crews to test systems and the heat shield. These were followed by 10 flights with crews in 1965 and 1966. All were launched by Titan II launch vehicles. Some highlights from the Gemini program:

- Gemini 3 (Grissom and Young) was the first crewed Gemini mission, first multi-crewed US mission, and the first crewed spacecraft to use thrusters to change its orbit.
- On Gemini 4, Ed White became the first American to make an extravehicular activity (EVA, or "spacewalk") on June 3, 1965.
- Gemini 5 (August 21–29, 1965) demonstrated the 8-day endurance necessary for an Apollo lunar mission with the first use of fuel cells to generate its electrical power.
- Gemini 6A accomplished the first space rendezvous with its sister craft Gemini 7 in December 1965, with Gemini 7 setting a 14-day endurance record for its flight.
- Gemini 8 achieved the first space docking with an uncrewed Agena target vehicle.
- Gemini 10 established that radiation at high altitude was not a problem, further demonstrated the ability to rendezvous with a passive object, and was the first Gemini mission to fire the Agena's own rocket. Michael Collins would be the first person to meet another spacecraft in orbit, during his second successful EVA.
- Gemini 11 first direct-ascent (first orbit) rendezvous with an Agena Target Vehicle, docking with it 1 hour 34 minutes after launch. Set a crewed Earth orbital altitude record of 739.2 nautical miles (1,369.0 km) in September 1966, using the Agena target vehicle's propulsion system. This record was broken in September 2024 by the Polaris Dawn mission, and again in April 2026 by the Artemis II mission.
- On Gemini 12, Edwin "Buzz" Aldrin became the first space traveler to prove that useful work (EVA) could be done outside a spacecraft without life-threatening exhaustion, due to newly implemented footholds, handholds, and scheduled rest periods.

Rendezvous in orbit is not a straightforward maneuver. Should a spacecraft increase its speed to catch up with another, the result is that it goes into a higher and slower orbit and the distance thereby increases. The right procedure is to go to a lower orbit first, which increases relative speed, and then approach the target spacecraft from below and decrease orbital speed to meet it. To practice these maneuvers, special rendezvous and docking simulators were built for the astronauts.

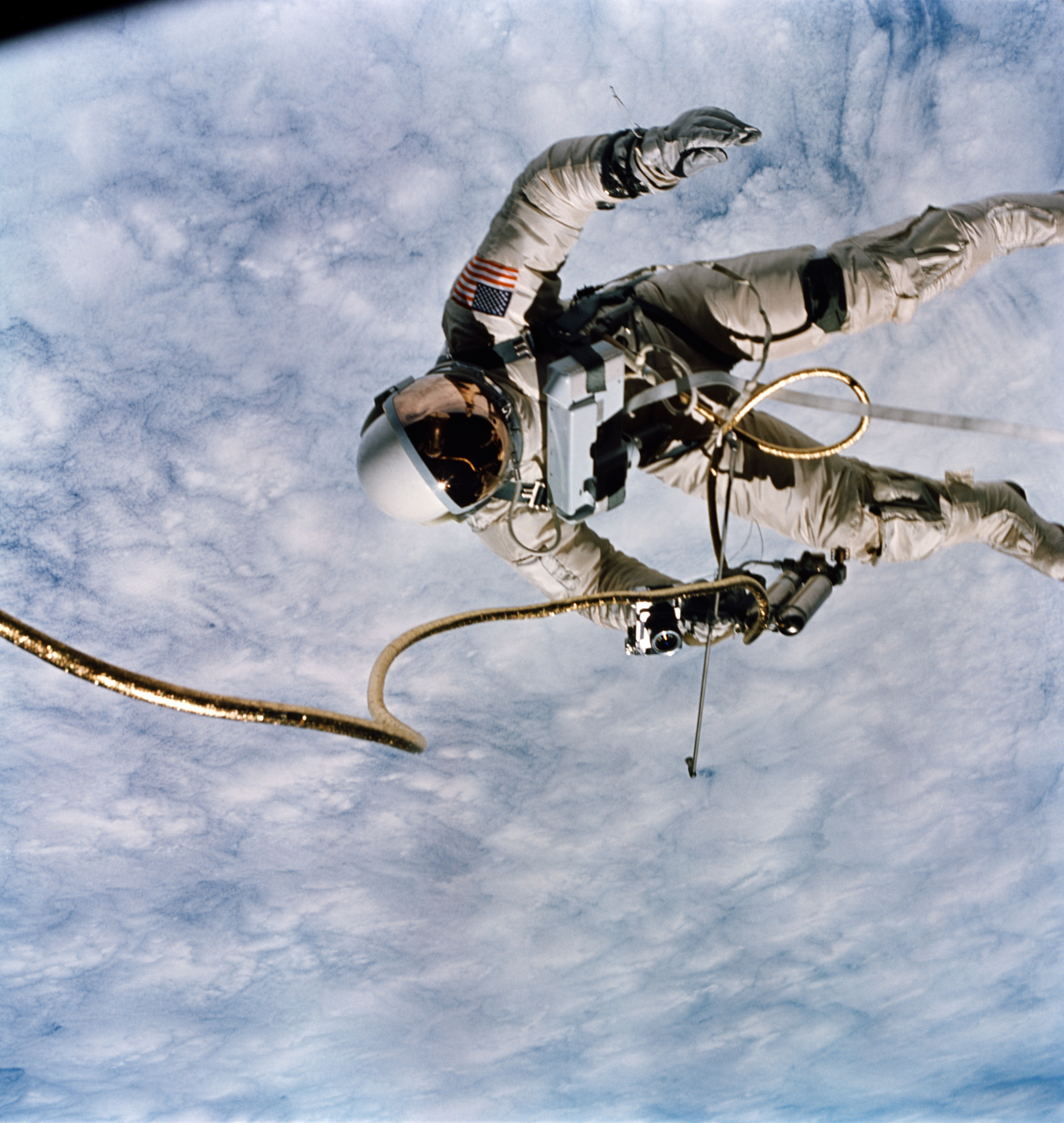
Edward White during spacewalk, Gemini 4, June 1965

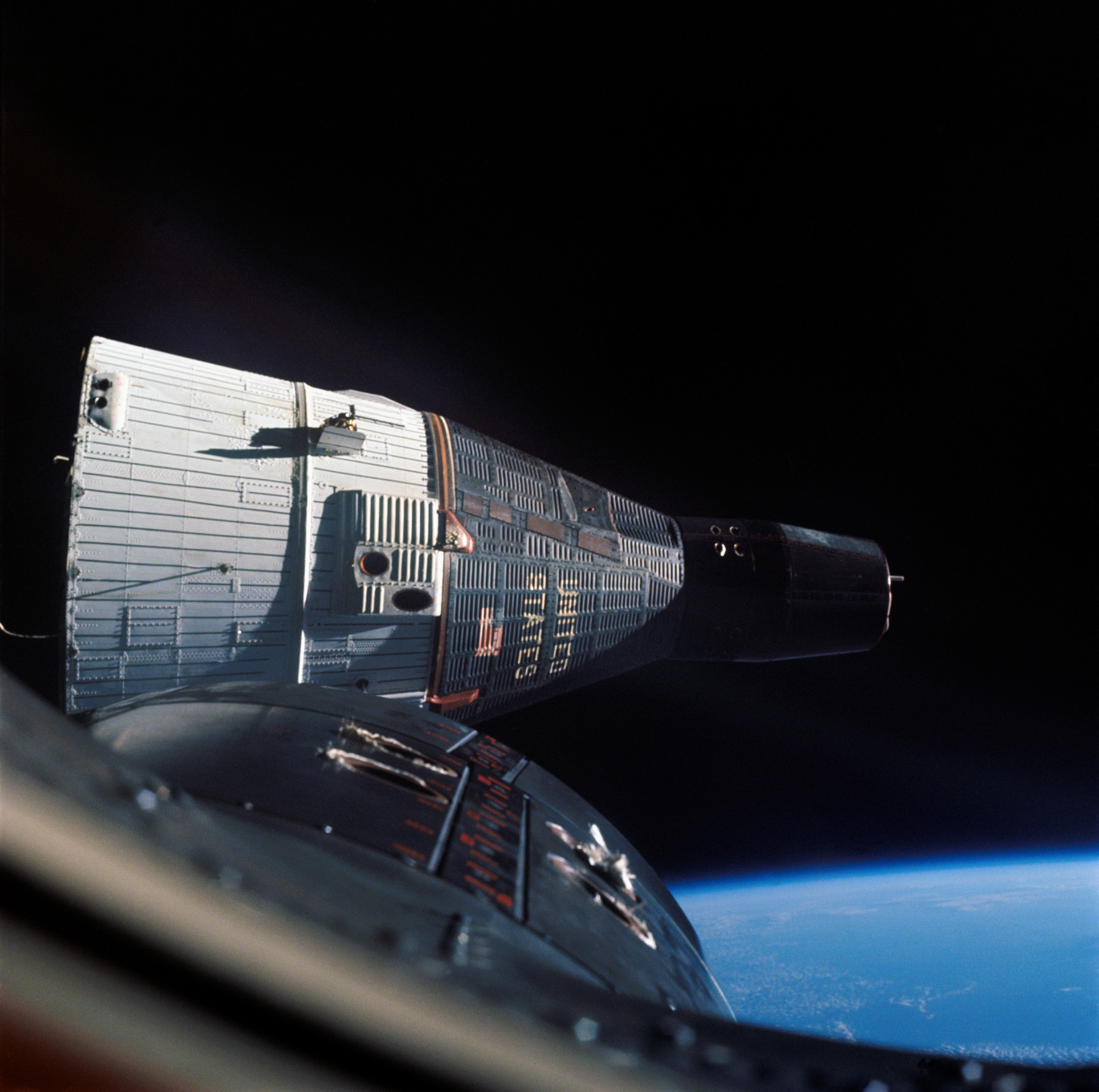
Rendezvous of Gemini 6A and 7, December 1965

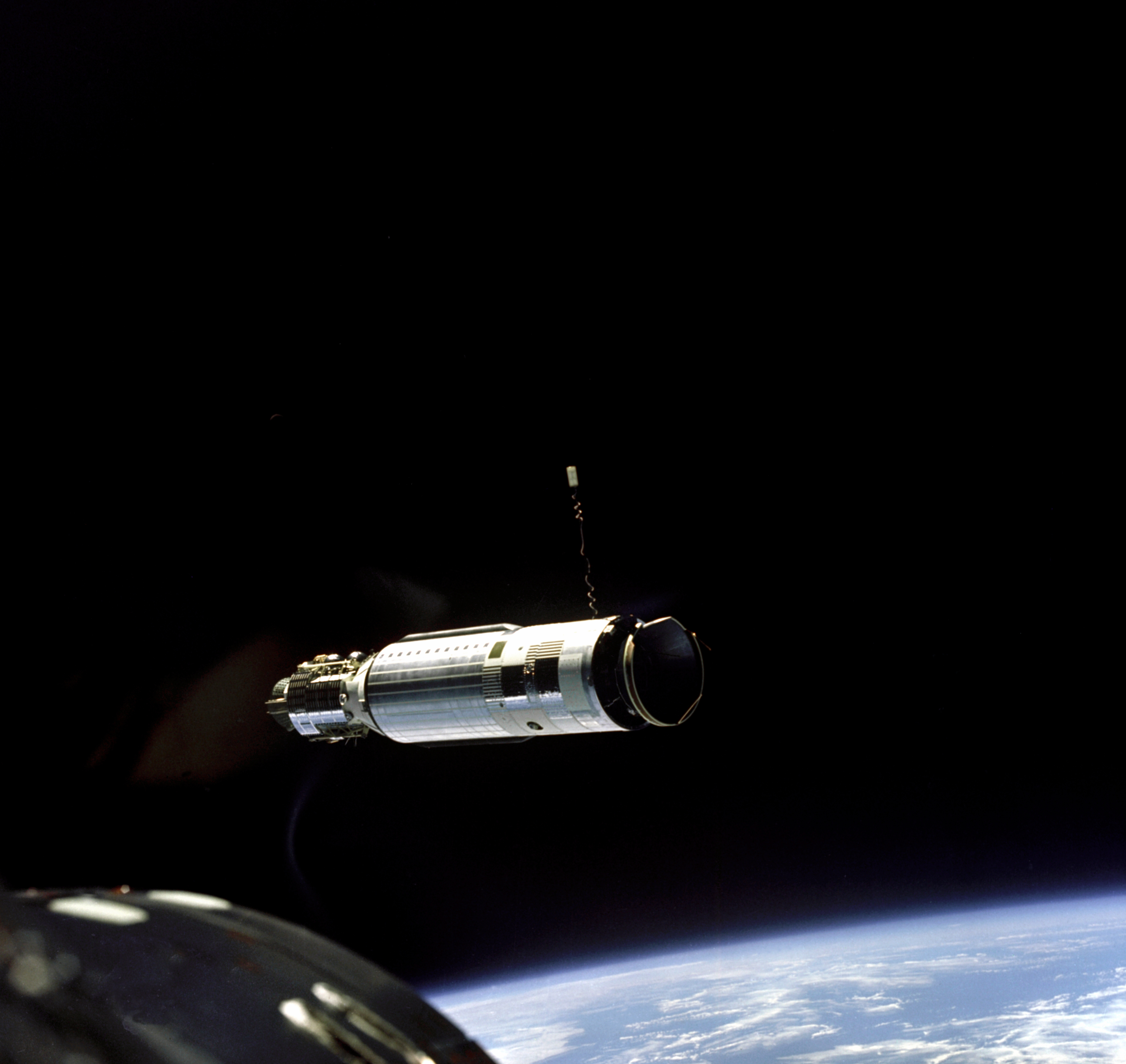
First docking; Agena target is seen from Gemini 8, March 1966

Mission	LV serial N^{o}	Spacecraft Nº	Command Pilot	Pilot	Mission dates	Launch time	Duration
Gemini 1	GLV-1 12556	SC1	Uncrewed	Uncrewed	8–12 April 1964	16:00 UTC	03d 23h^{1}
Gemini 1	First test flight of Gemini; spacecraft was intentionally destroyed during re-entry 1: The mission duration was 4h 50m, sufficient to achieve all of the mission aims in three orbits; the spacecraft remained in orbit for 3d 23h.						
Gemini 2	GLV-2 12557	SC2	Uncrewed	Uncrewed	19 January 1965	14:04 UTC	00d 00h 18m 16s
Gemini 2	Suborbital flight to test heat shield						
Gemini 3	GLV-3 12558	SC3	Grissom	Young	23 March 1965	14:24 UTC	00d 04h 52m 31s
Gemini 3	First crewed Gemini flight, three orbits.						
Gemini IV	GLV-4 12559	SC4	McDivitt	White	3–7 June 1965	15:16 UTC	04d 01h 56m 12s
Gemini IV	Included first extravehicular activity (EVA) by an American; White's "space walk" was a 22-minute EVA exercise.						
Gemini V	GLV-5 12560	SC5	Cooper	Conrad	21–29 August 1965	14:00 UTC	07d 22h 55m 14s
Gemini V	First week-long flight; first use of fuel cells for electrical power; evaluated guidance and navigation system for future rendezvous missions. Completed 120 orbits.						
Gemini VII	GLV-7 12562	SC7	Borman	Lovell	4–18 December 1965	19:30 UTC	13d 18h 35m 01s
Gemini VII	When the original Gemini VI mission was scrubbed because the launch of the Agena docking target failed, Gemini VII was used as the rendezvous target instead. Primary objective was to determine whether humans could live in space for 14 days. Completed 206 orbits.						
Gemini VI-A	GLV-6 12561	SC6	Schirra	Stafford	15–16 December 1965	13:37 UTC	01d 01h 51m 24s
Gemini VI-A	Rescheduled from October to rendezvous with Gemini VII after the original Agena Target Vehicle launch failed. First space rendezvous accomplished, station-keeping for over five hours at distances from 1 to 300 feet (0.30 to 91 m). First musical instruments played in space; crew played "Jingle Bells" on a harmonica and a ring of small bells as part of a jocular Santa Claus sighting.						
Gemini VIII	GLV-8 12563	SC8	Armstrong	Scott	16–17 March 1966	16:41 UTC	00d 10h 41m 26s
Gemini VIII	Accomplished first docking with another space vehicle, an uncrewed Agena Target Vehicle. While docked, a Gemini spacecraft thruster malfunction caused near-fatal tumbling of the craft, which, after undocking, Armstrong was able to overcome; the crew effected the first emergency landing of a crewed U.S. space mission.						
Gemini IX-A	GLV-9 12564	SC9	Stafford	Cernan	3–6 June 1966	13:39 UTC	03d 00h 20m 50s
Gemini IX-A	Rescheduled from May to rendezvous and dock with the Augmented Target Docking Adapter (ATDA) after the original Agena Target Vehicle launch failed. The ATDA shroud did not completely separate, making docking impossible (right). Three different types of rendezvous, two hours of EVA, and 44 orbits were completed.						
Gemini X	GLV-10 12565	SC10	Young	Collins	18–21 July 1966	22:20 UTC	02d 22h 46m 39s
Gemini X	First use of the Agena Target Vehicle's propulsion systems. The spacecraft also rendezvoused with the Agena Target Vehicle from Gemini VIII. Collins had 49 minutes of EVA standing in the hatch and 39 minutes of EVA to retrieve experiments from the Agena. 43 orbits completed.						
Gemini XI	GLV-11 12566	SC11	Conrad	Gordon	12–15 September 1966	14:42 UTC	02d 23h 17m 09s
Gemini XI	Gemini record altitude with apogee of 739.2 nautical miles (1,369.0 km) reached using the Agena Target Vehicle propulsion system after first orbit rendezvous and docking. Gordon made a 33-minute EVA and two-hour standup EVA. 44 orbits.						
Gemini XII	GLV-12 12567	SC12	Lovell	Aldrin	11–15 November 1966	20:46 UTC	03d 22h 34m 31s
Gemini XII	Final Gemini flight. Rendezvoused and docked manually with the target Agena and kept station with it during EVA. Aldrin set an EVA record of 5 hours and 30 minutes for one space walk and two stand-up exercises, and demonstrated solutions to previous EVA problems. 59 orbits completed						

== Gemini-Titan launches and serial numbers ==
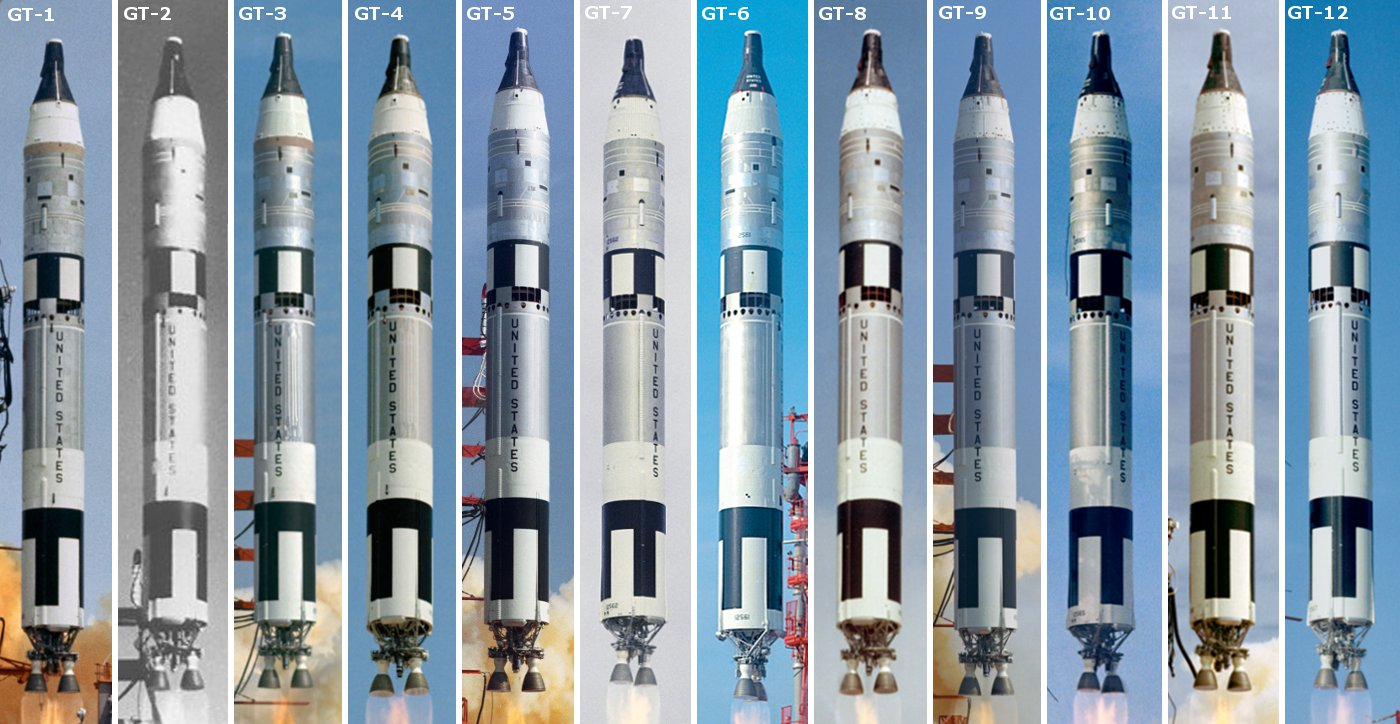
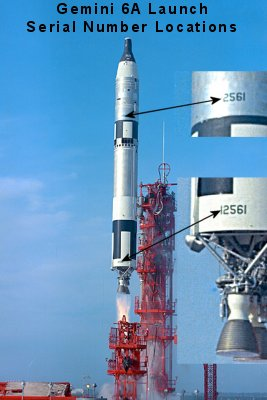
Left: All Gemini launches from GT-1 through GT-12. Right: USAF serial number location on Titan II

The Gemini-Titan II launch vehicle was adapted by NASA from the U.S. Air Force Titan II ICBM. (Similarly, the Mercury-Atlas launch vehicle had been adapted from the USAF Atlas missile.) The Gemini-Titan II rockets were assigned Air Force serial numbers, which were painted in four places on each Titan II (on opposite sides on each of the first and second stages). USAF crews maintained Launch Complex 19 and prepared and launched all of the Gemini-Titan II launch vehicles. Data and experience operating the Titans was of value to both the U.S. Air Force and NASA.

The USAF serial numbers assigned to the Gemini-Titan launch vehicles are given in the tables above. Fifteen Titan IIs were ordered in 1962 so the serial is "62-12XXX", but only "12XXX" is painted on the Titan II. The order for the last three of the 15 launch vehicles was canceled on July 30, 1964, and they were never built. Serial numbers were, however, assigned to them prospectively: 12568 - GLV-13; 12569 - GLV-14; and 12570 - GLV-15.

== Program cost ==
From 1962 to 1967, Gemini cost $1.3 billion in 1967 dollars ($9.56 billion in 2025). In January 1969, a NASA report to the US Congress estimating the costs for Mercury, Gemini, and Apollo (through the first crewed Moon landing) included $1.2834 billion for Gemini: $797.4 million for spacecraft, $409.8 million for launch vehicles, and $76.2 million for support.

== Current location of hardware ==
=== Spacecraft ===
- Gemini 1: Intentionally disintegrated upon re-entry to the atmosphere
- Gemini 2: Air Force Space and Missile Museum, Cape Canaveral Air Force Station, Florida
- Gemini III: Grissom Memorial, Spring Mill State Park, Mitchell, Indiana
- Gemini IV: National Air and Space Museum, Washington, D.C.
- Gemini V: Johnson Space Center, NASA, Houston, Texas
- Gemini VI: Stafford Air & Space Museum, Weatherford, Oklahoma
- Gemini VII: National Air and Space Museum, Washington, D.C.
- Gemini VIII: Armstrong Air and Space Museum, Wapakoneta, Ohio
- Gemini IX: Kennedy Space Center, NASA, Merritt Island, Florida
- Gemini X: Kansas Cosmosphere and Space Center, Hutchinson, Kansas
- Gemini XI: California Science Center, Los Angeles, California
- Gemini XII: Adler Planetarium, Chicago, Illinois
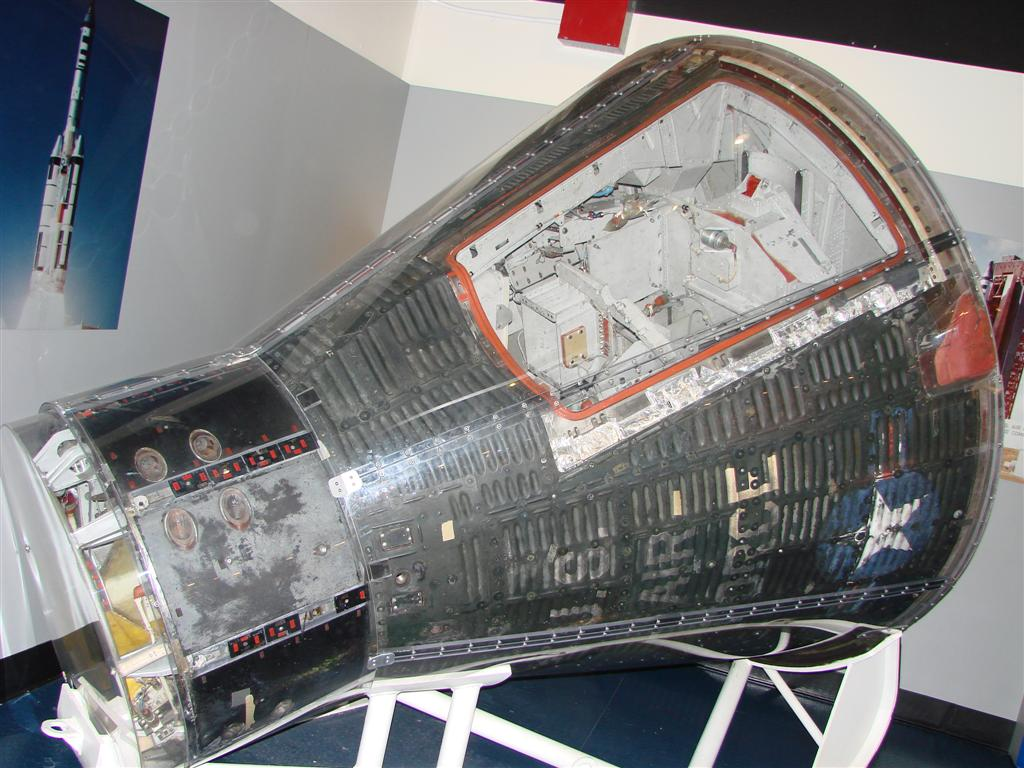
Gemini 2 at Air Force Space and Missile Museum in 2006

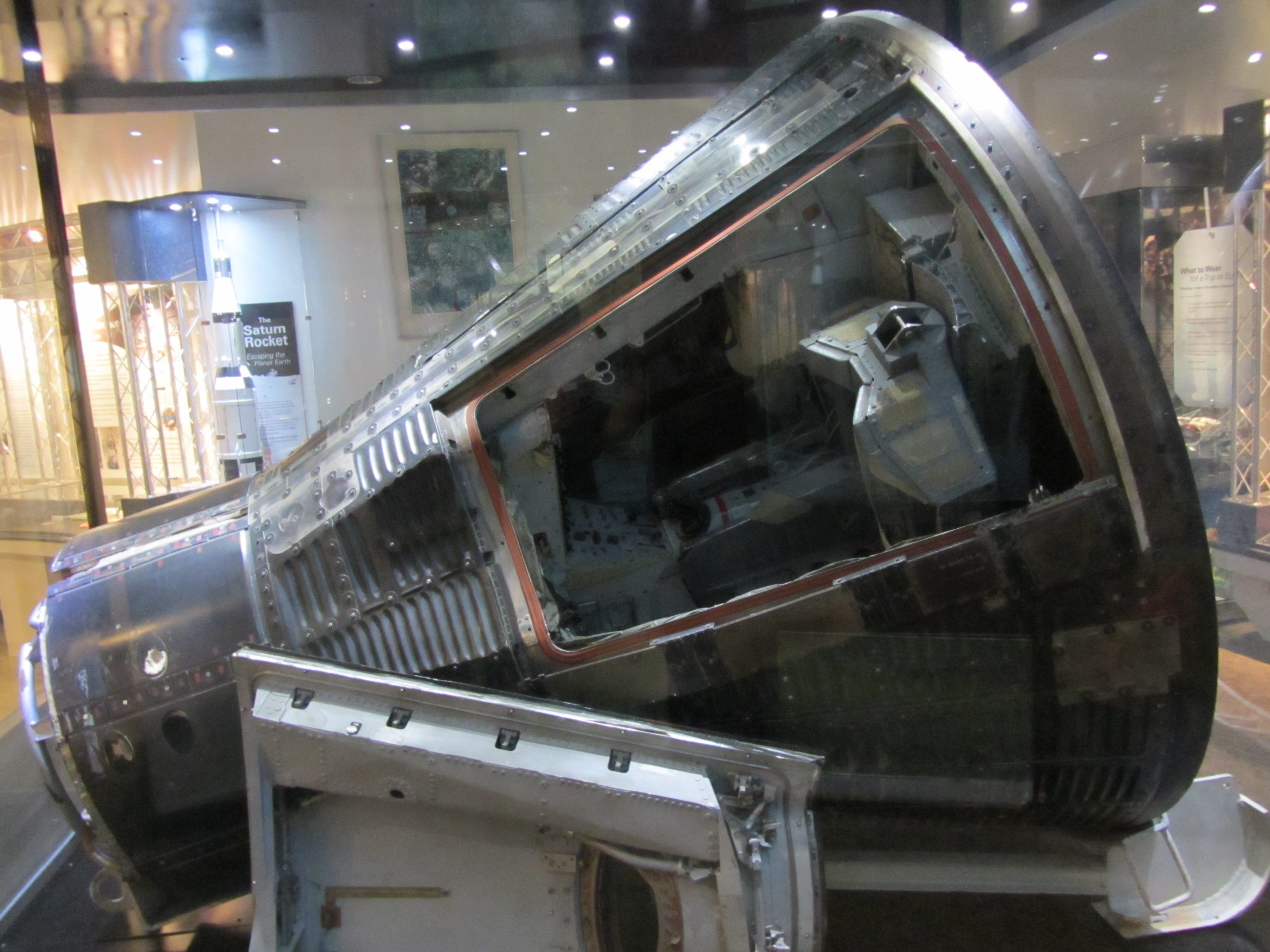
Gemini III at Grissom Memorial in 2011

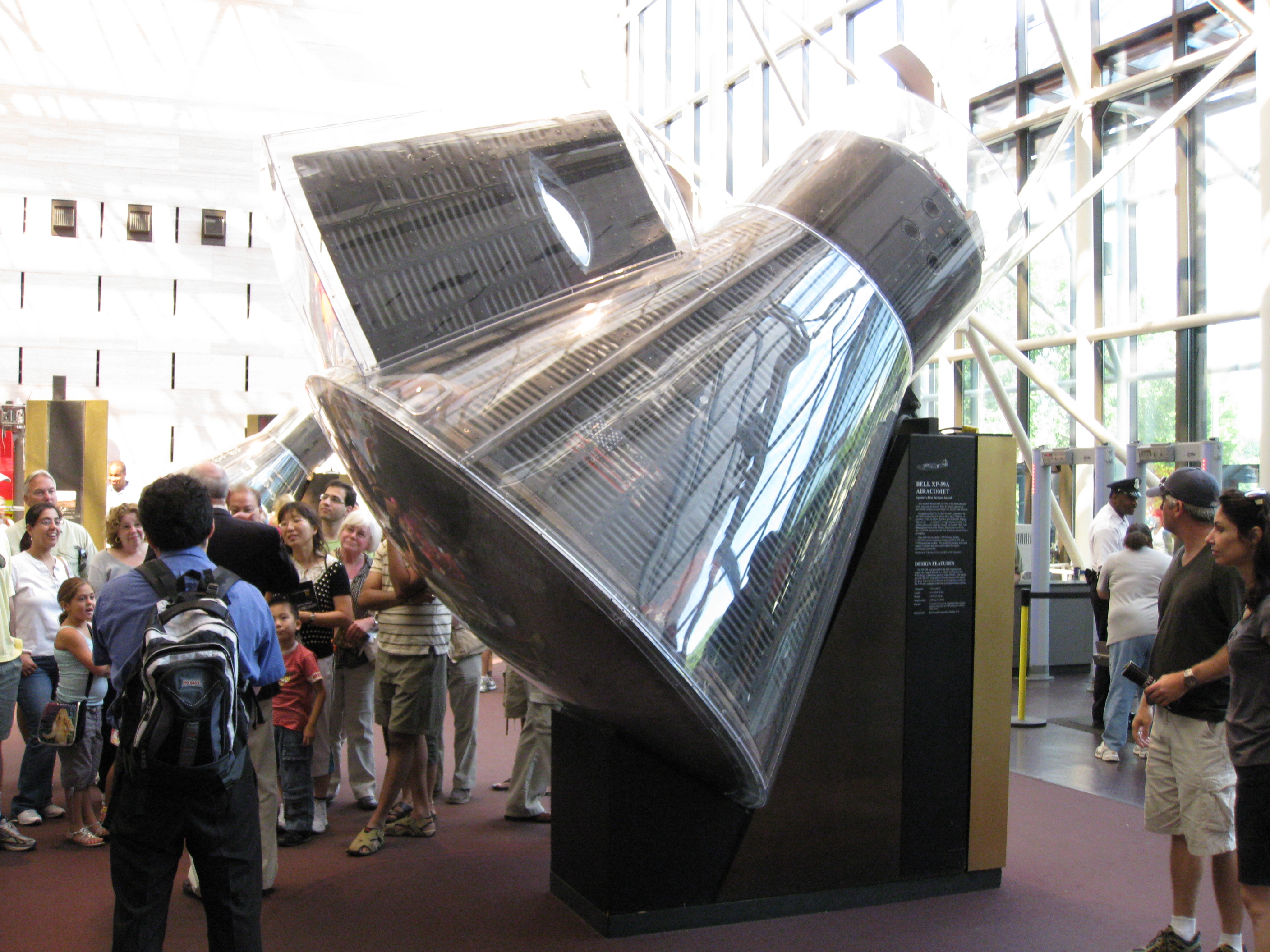
Gemini IV at National Air and Space Museum in 2009

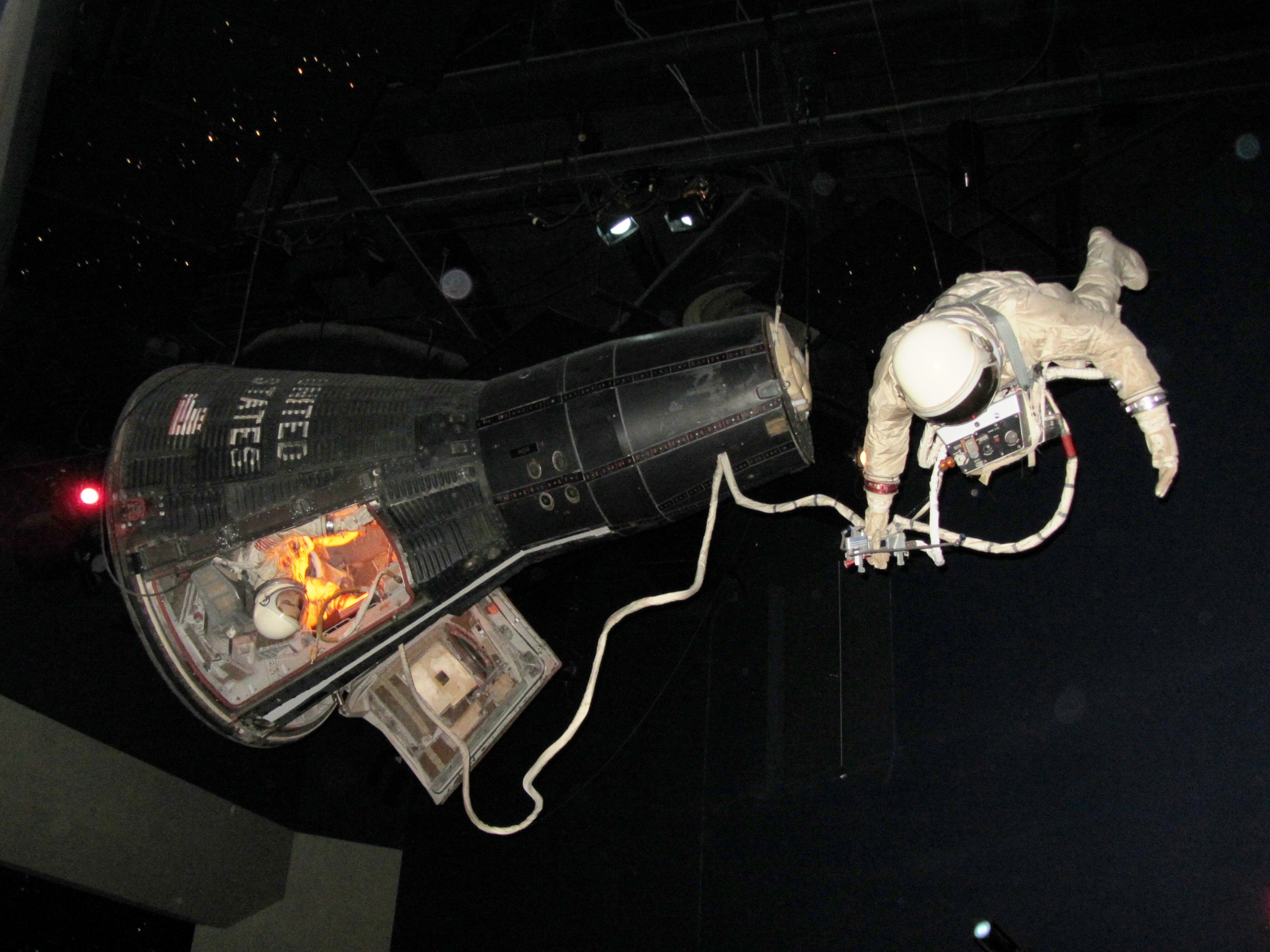
Gemini V at Johnson Space Center in 2011

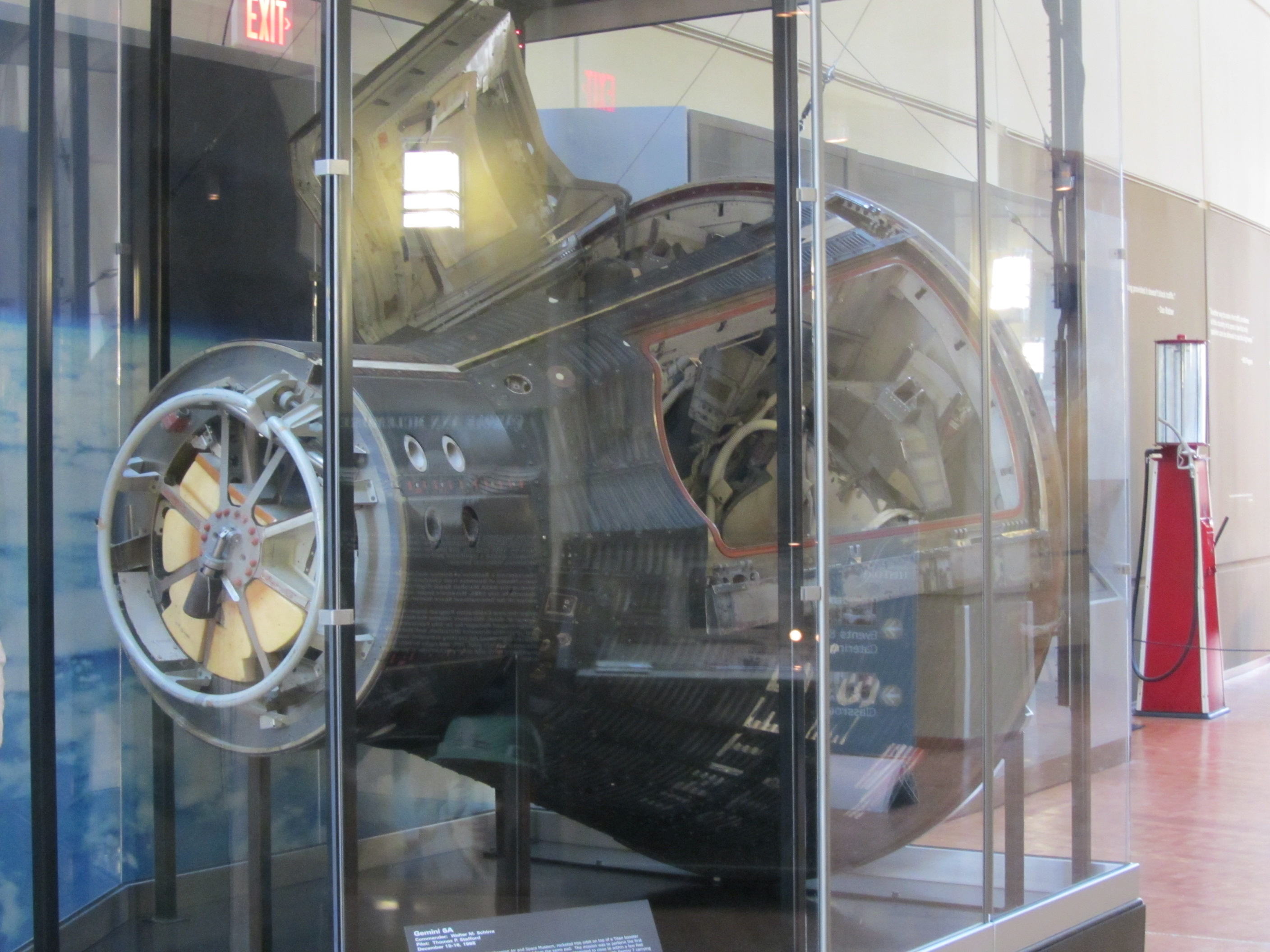
Gemini VI-A at Stafford Air & Space Museum in 2011

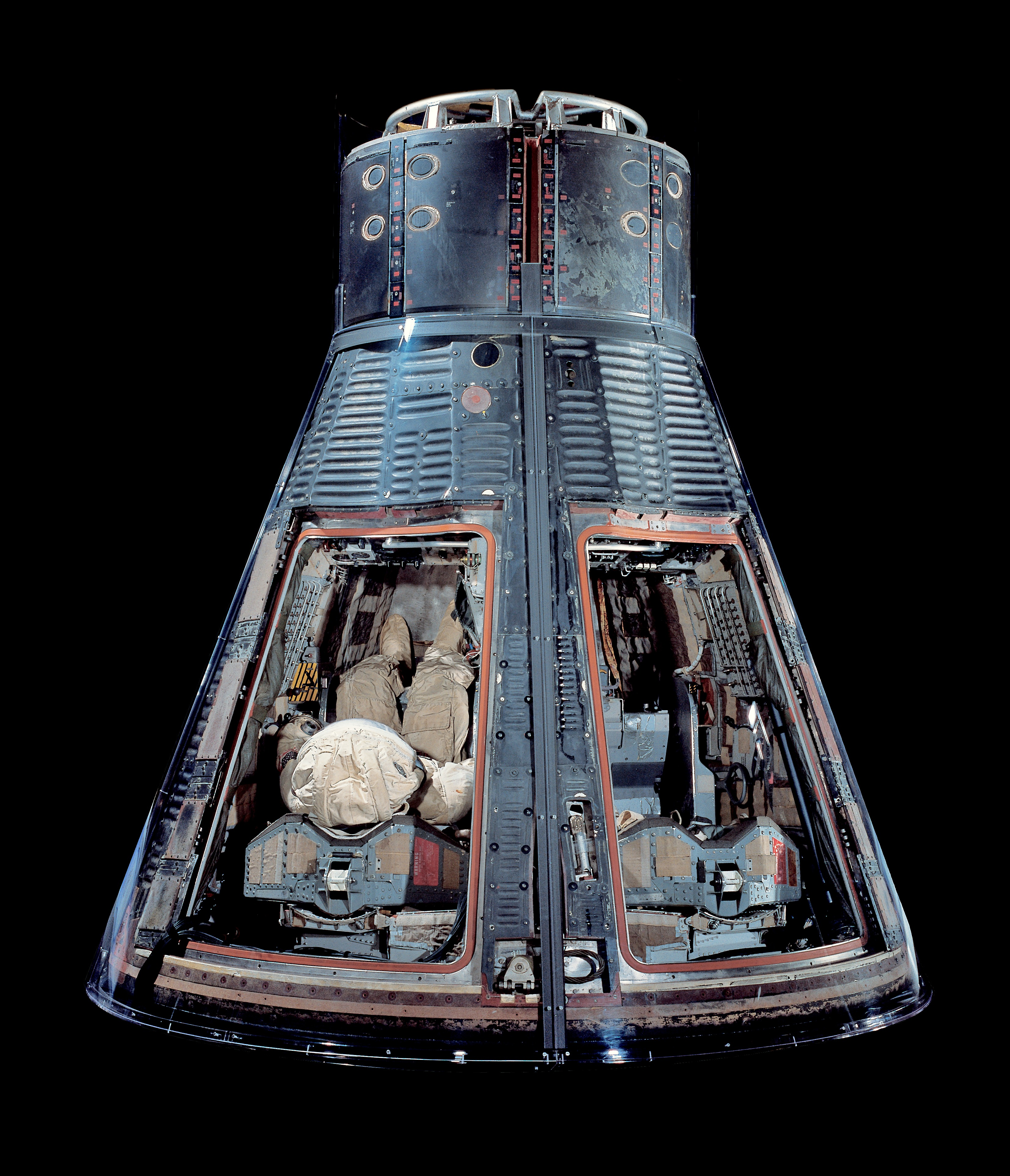
Gemini VII at Steven F. Udvar-Hazy Center

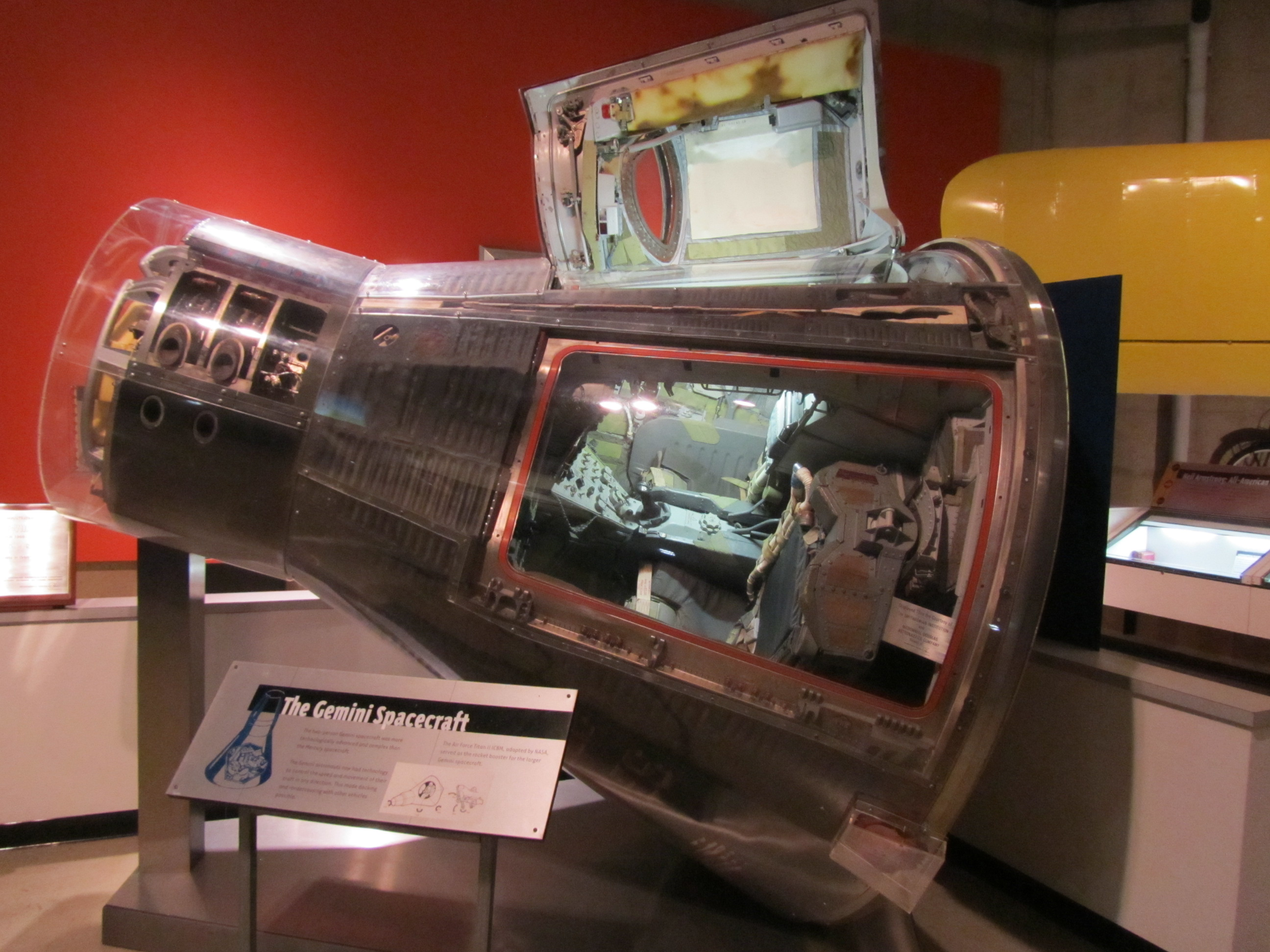
Gemini VIII at Armstrong Air and Space Museum in 2010

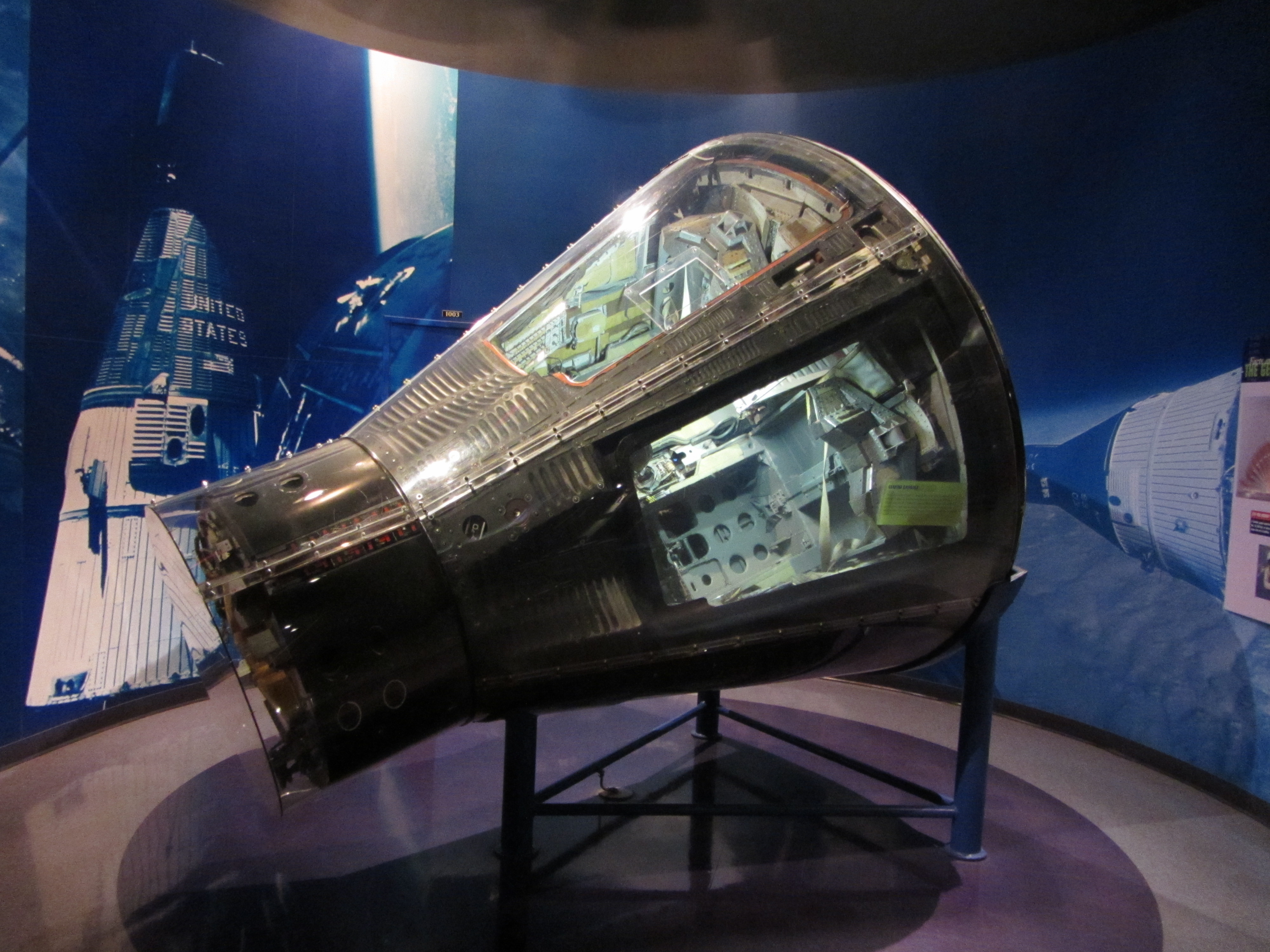
Gemini IX-A at Kennedy Space Center in 2011

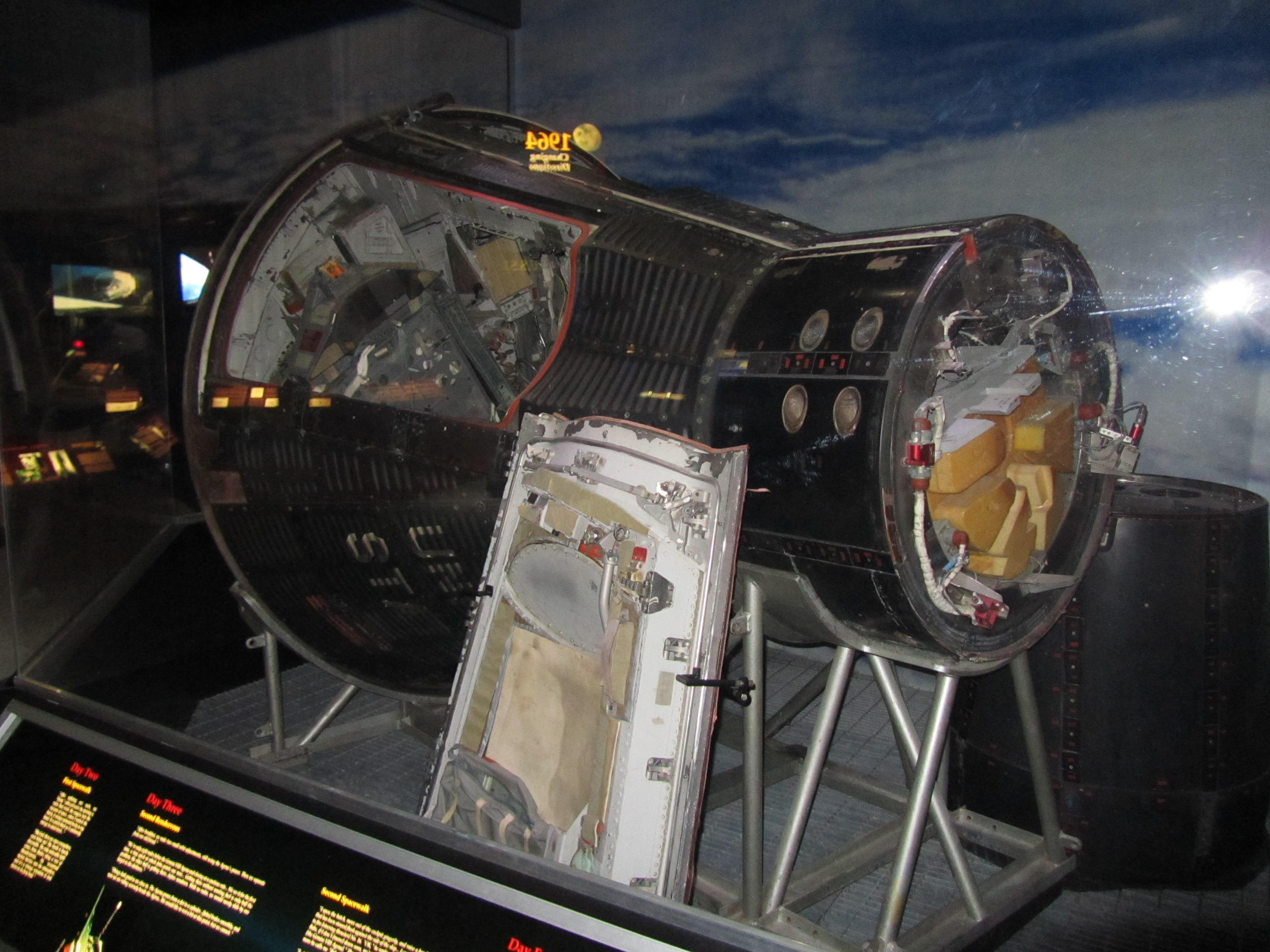
Gemini X at Kansas Cosmosphere and Space Center in 2010

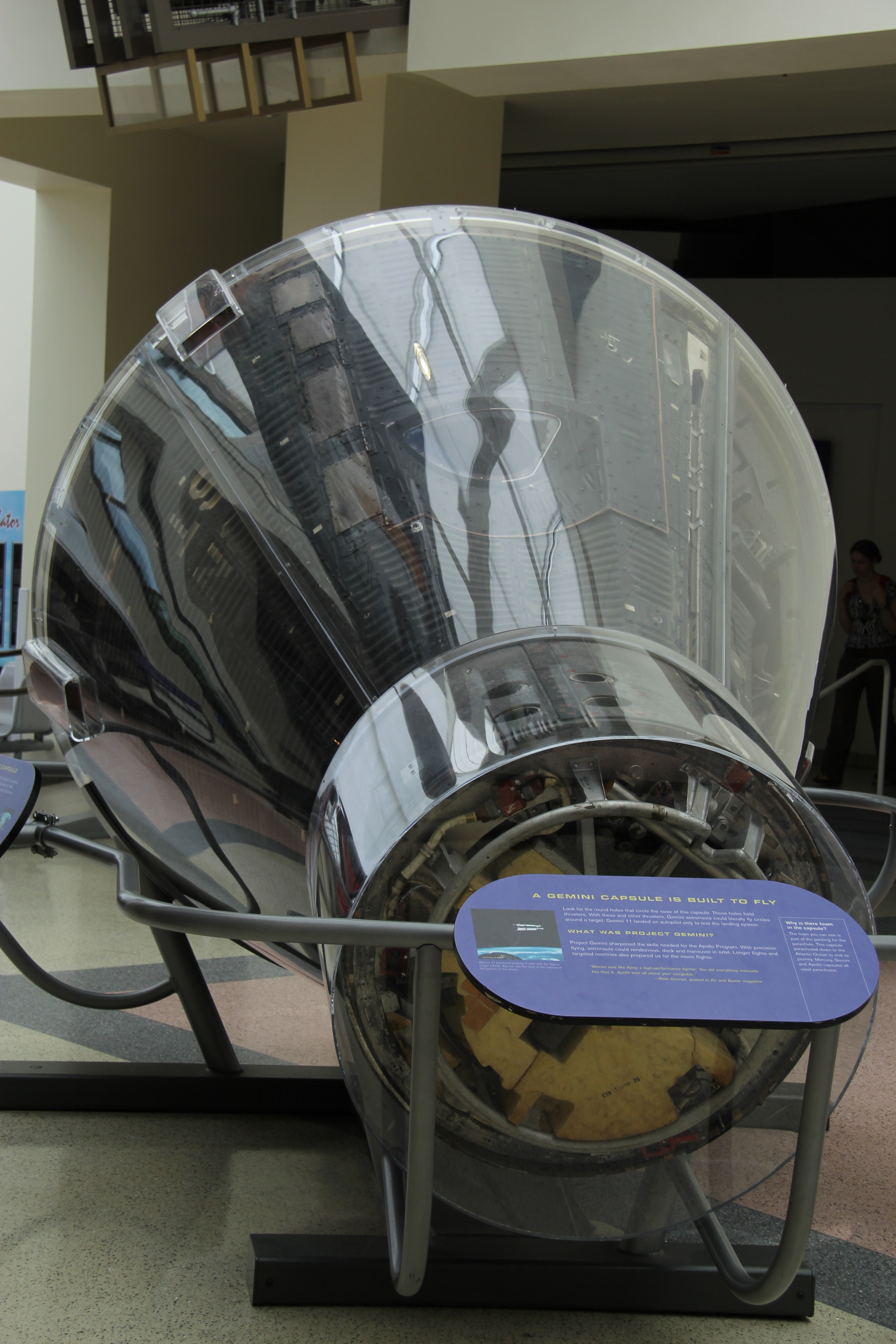
Gemini XI at California Museum of Science and Industry in 2013

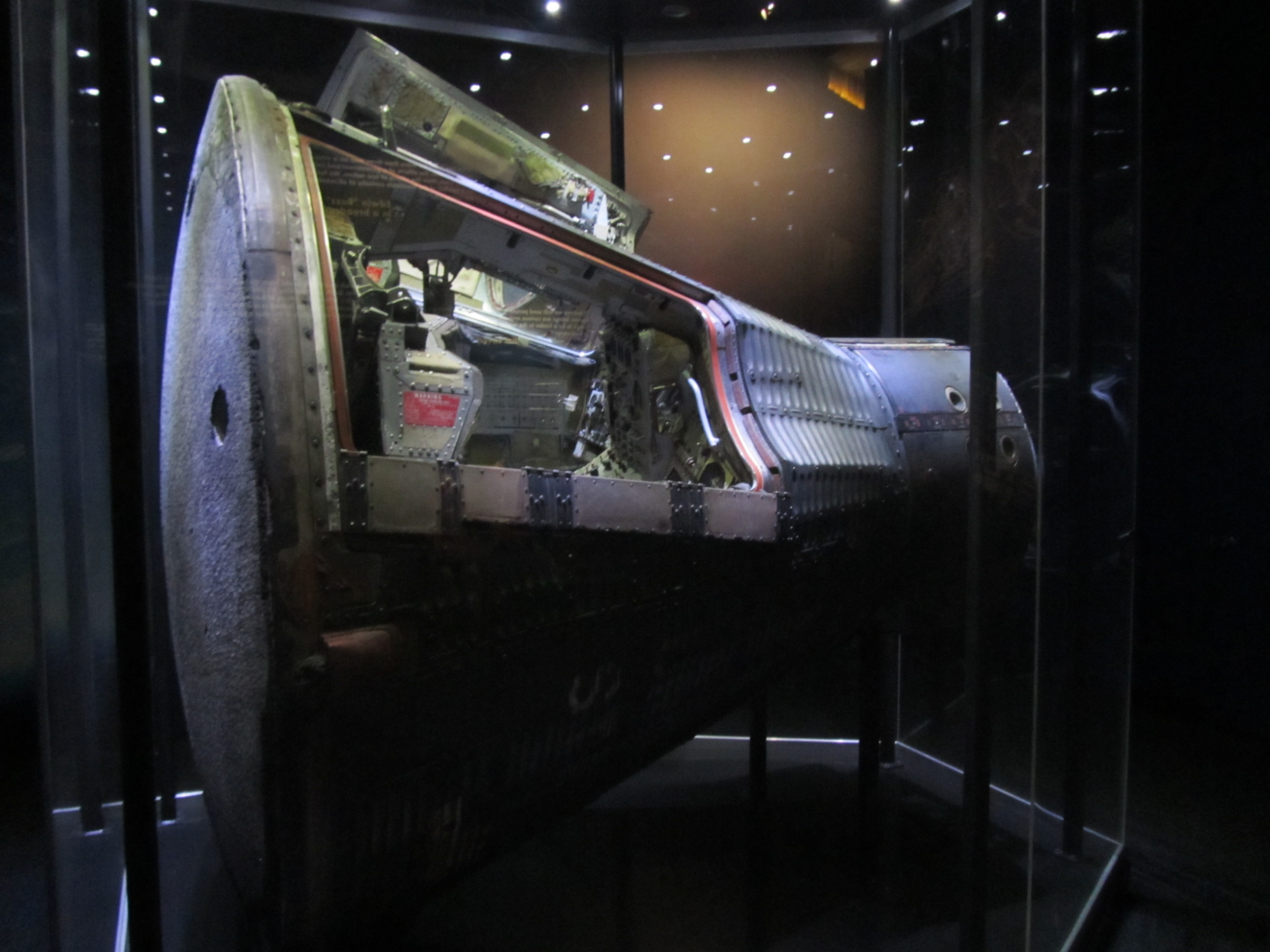
Gemini XII at Adler Planetarium in 2010

=== Trainers and boilerplates ===
- Gemini 3A (2411): St. Louis Science Center, St. Louis, Missouri.
- Gemini MOL-B (2411): National Museum of the United States Air Force, Wright-Patterson Air Force Base, Dayton, Ohio
- Gemini Mission Simulator (5143): U.S. Space & Rocket Center, Huntsville, Alabama
- Gemini Trainer: Discovery Center, Fresno, California
- Gemini Trainer: Kentucky Science Center, Louisville, Kentucky
- Gemini Water Egress Trainer: Texas Air Museum, Slaton, Texas
- Gemini Trainer: Kalamazoo Air Museum, Kalamazoo, Michigan
- Trainer: Pate Museum of Transportation, Fort Worth, Texas
- GATV (6165): National Air and Space Museum, Washington, D.C. (not on display)
- El Kabong: Kalamazoo Air Museum, Kalamazoo, Michigan
- MSC 312: Private residence, Holden, MA
- MSC 313: Private residence, San Jose, California
- Paresev 1A (Rogallo Test Vehicle): Steven F. Udvar-Hazy Center, Chantilly, Virginia
- TTV-1 (6873) paraglider capsule: Steven F. Udvar-Hazy Center, Chantilly, Virginia
- TTV-2 paraglider capsule: Museum of Scotland, Edinburgh
- Gemini boilerplate: Air Force Space and Missile Museum, Cape Canaveral Space Force Station, Florida
- Gemini boilerplate: Air Force Space and Missile Museum, Cape Canaveral Space Force Station, Florida
- Ingress/Egress Trainer: U.S. Space & Rocket Center, Huntsville, Alabama
- MSC-307: USS Hornet Museum, former NAS Alameda, Alameda, California
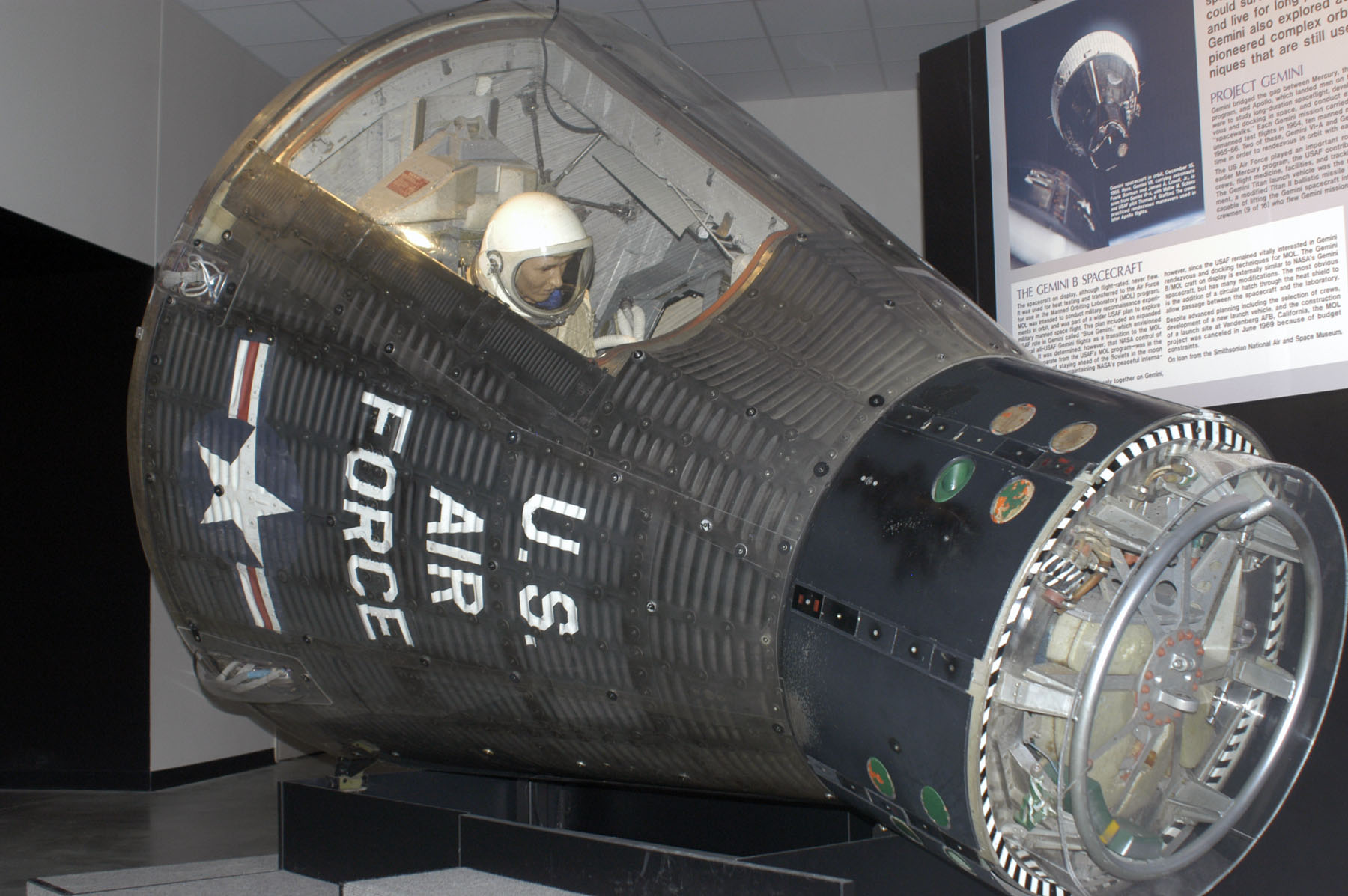
Gemini MOL-B, National Museum of the United States Air Force.

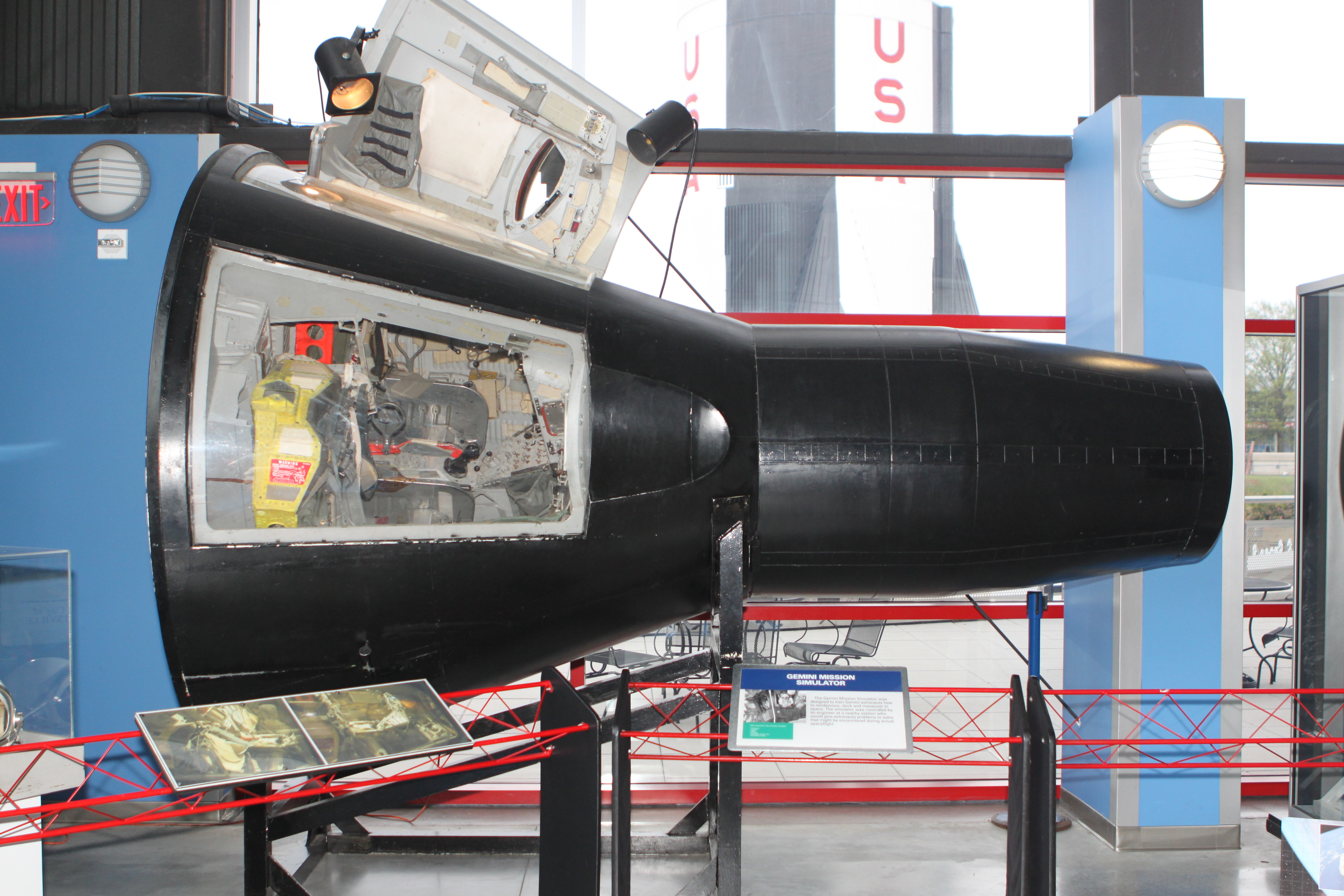
Gemini Mission Simulator, U.S. Space & Rocket Center.

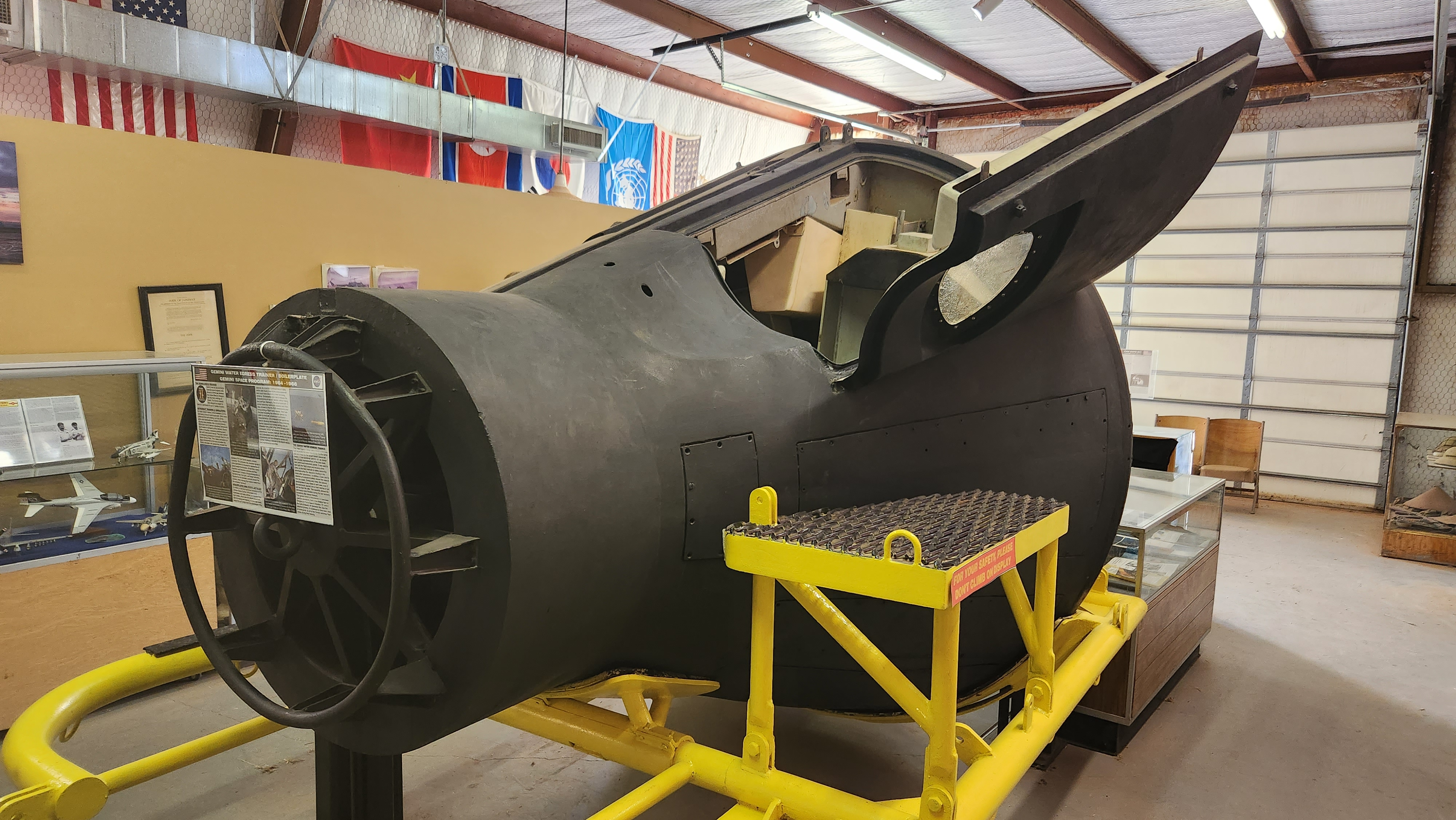
Gemini Water Egress Trainer, Texas Air Museum.

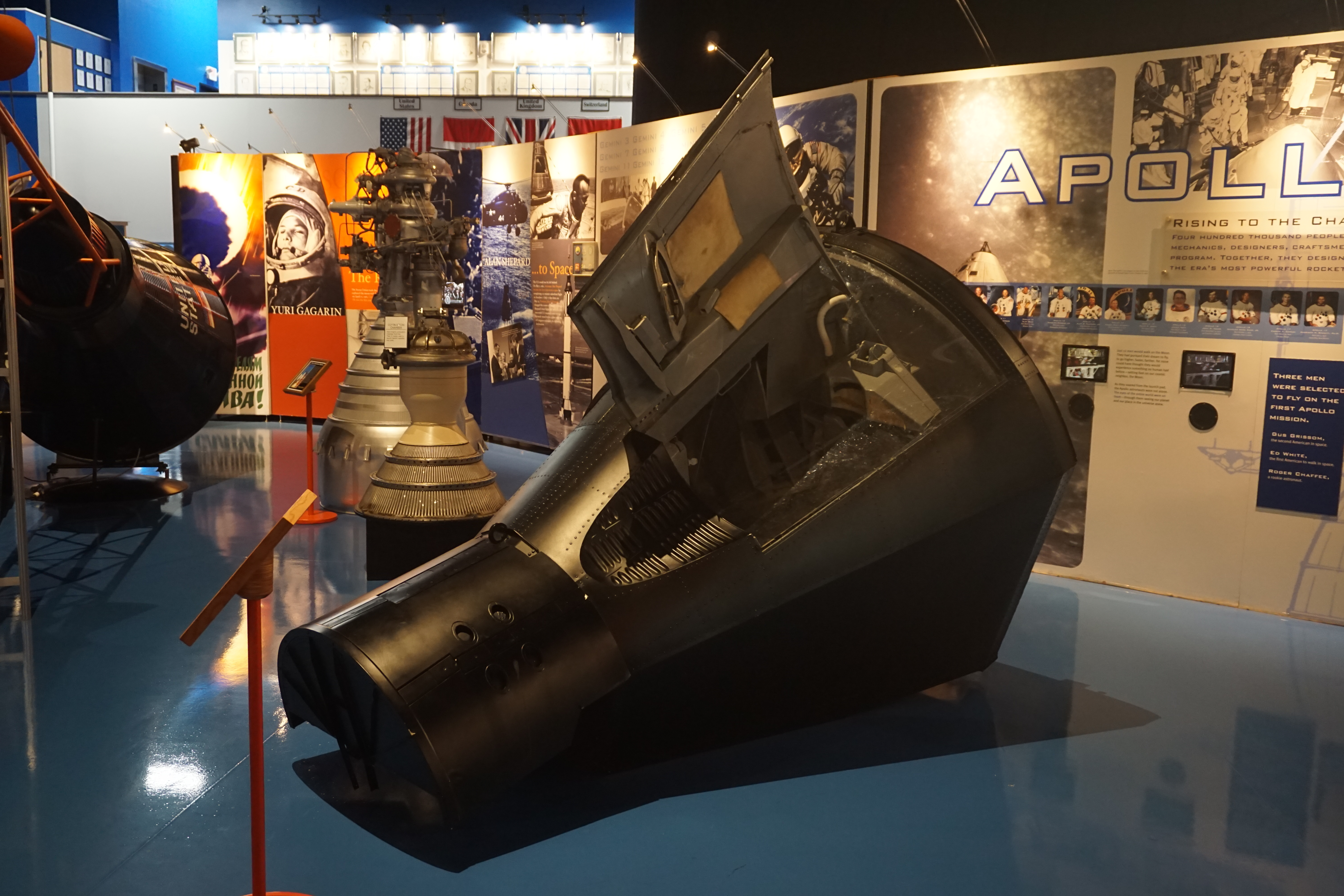
Gemini Trainer, Kalamazoo Air Museum.

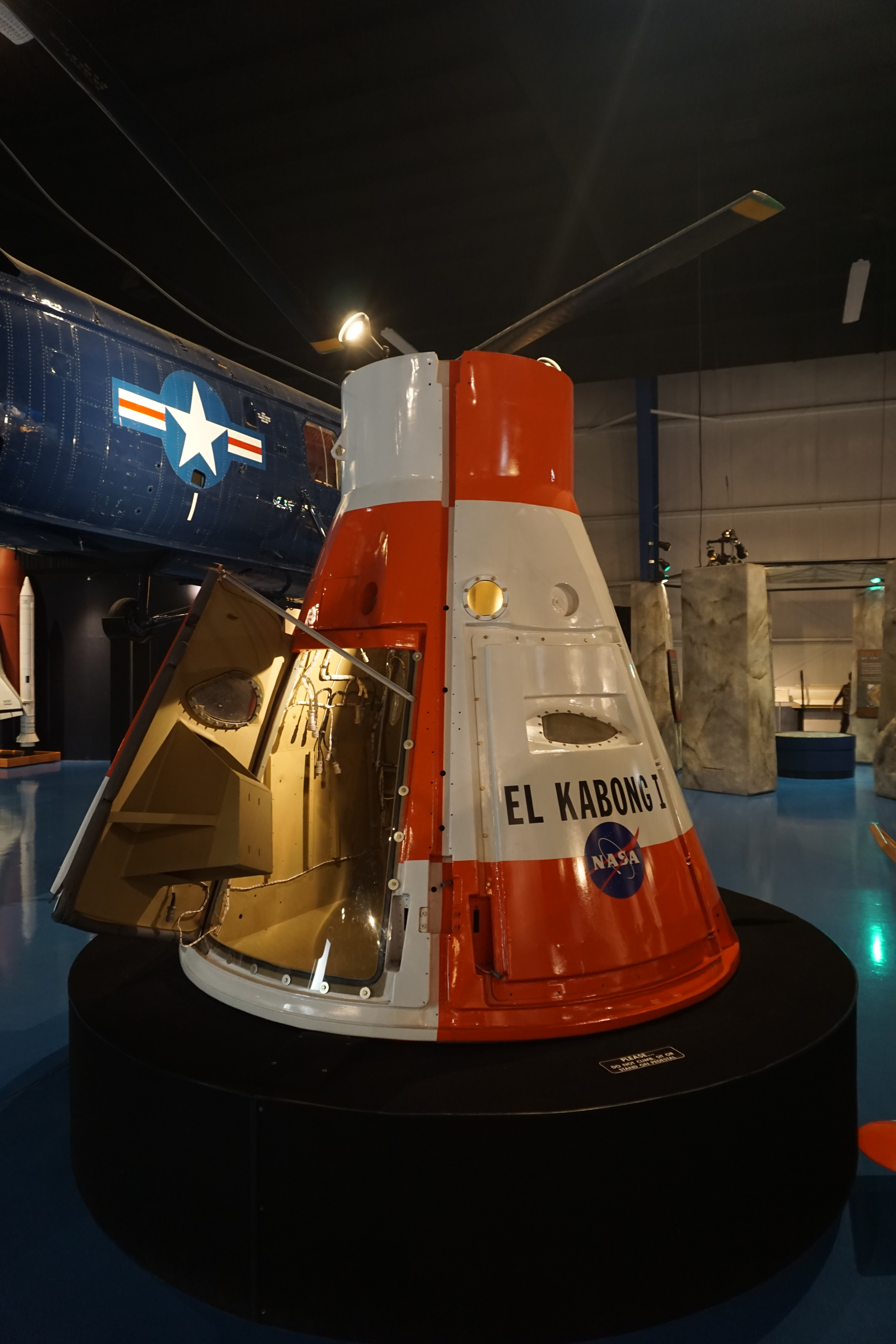
El Kabong, Kalamazoo Air Museum.

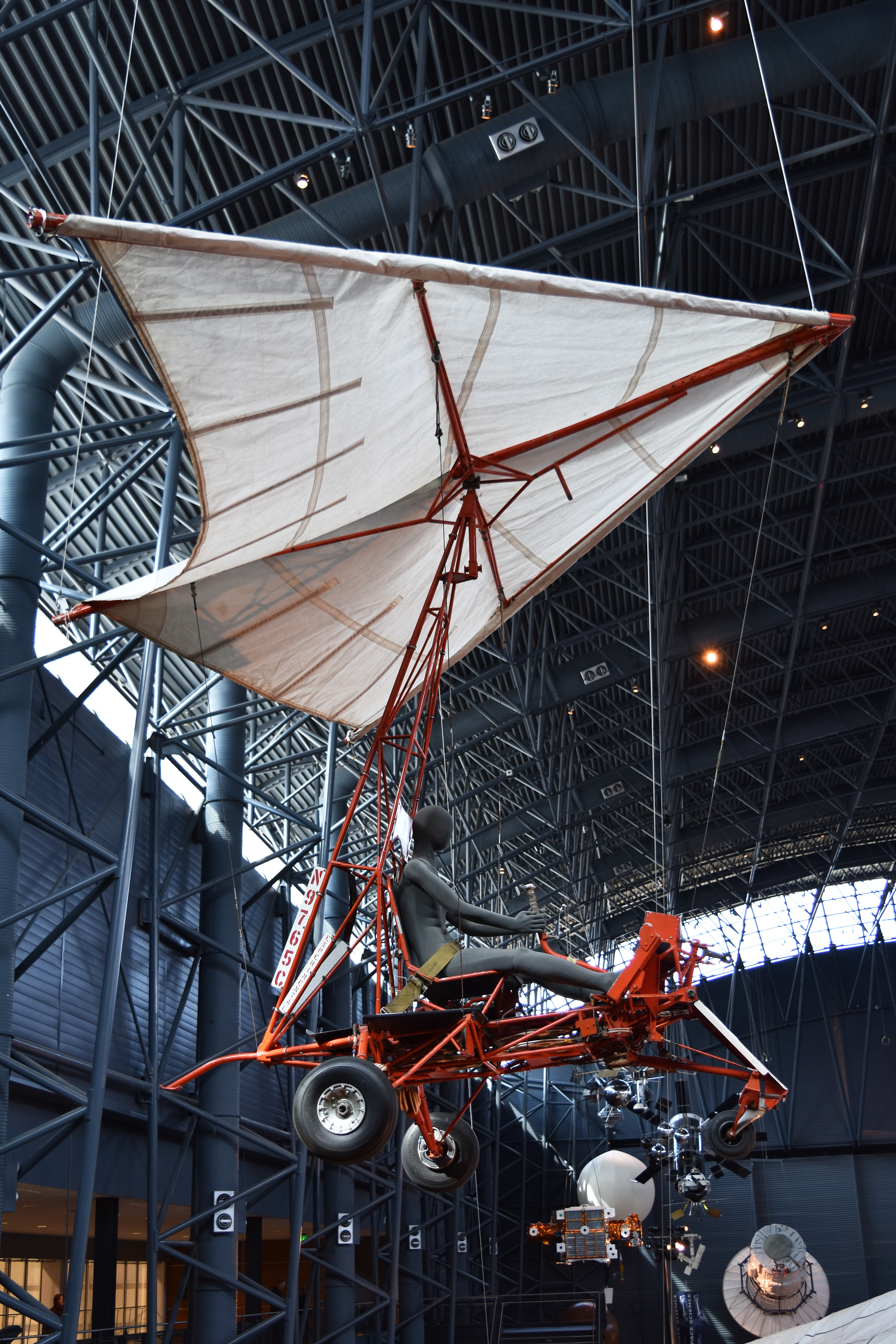
Paresev 1A, Steven F. Udvar-Hazy Center.

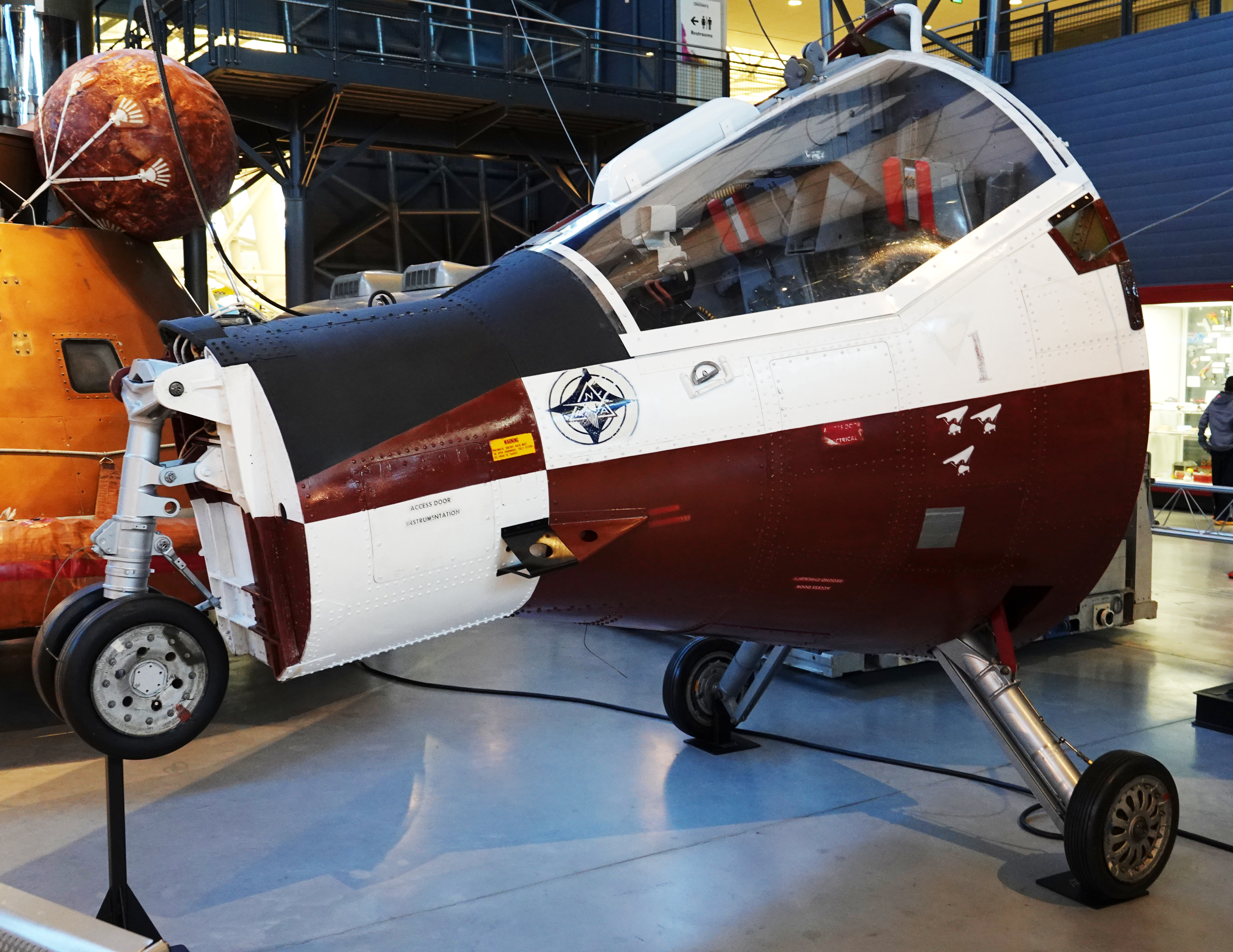
TTV-1, Steven F. Udvar-Hazy Center.

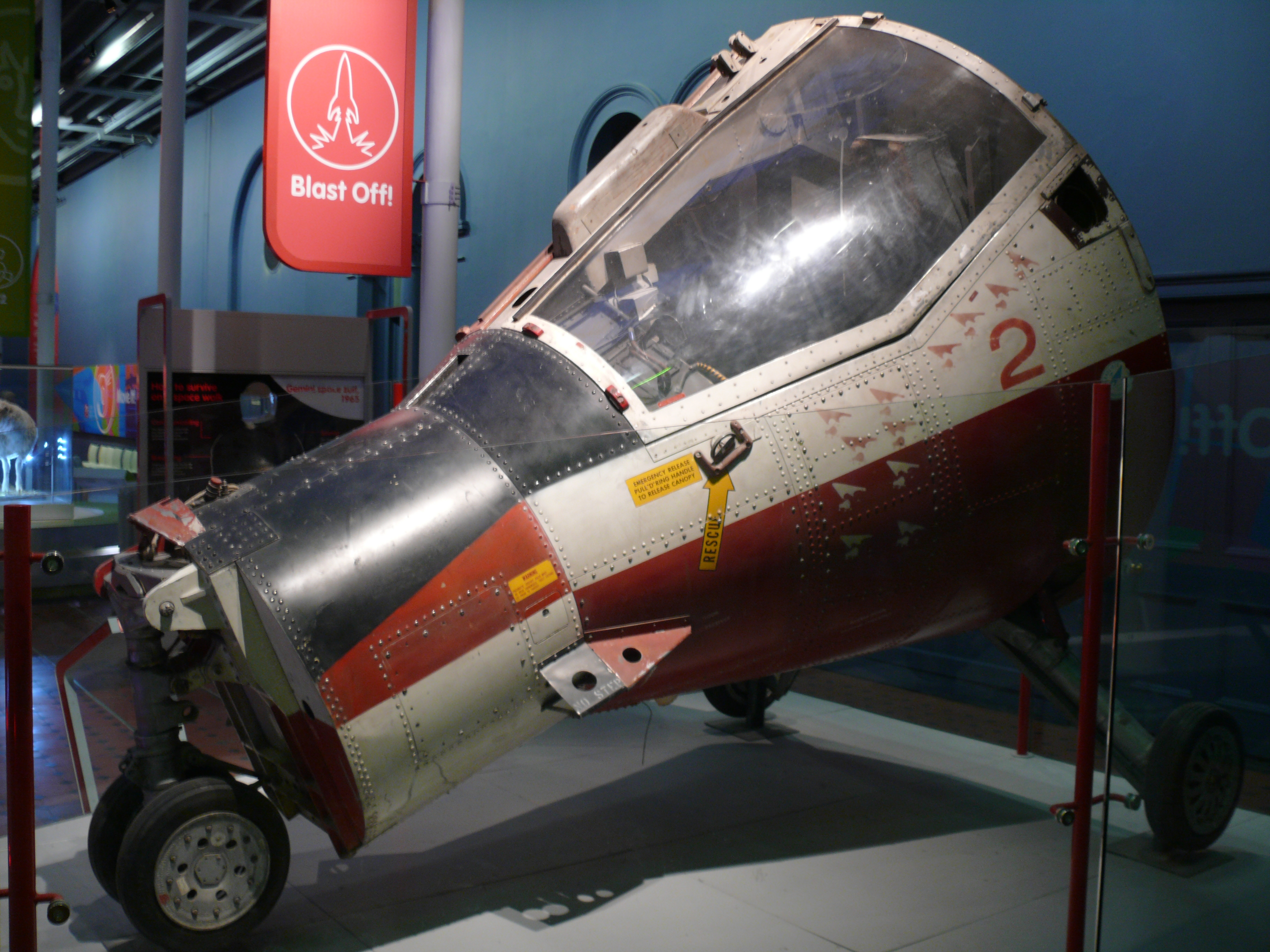
TTV-2, Museum of Scotland.

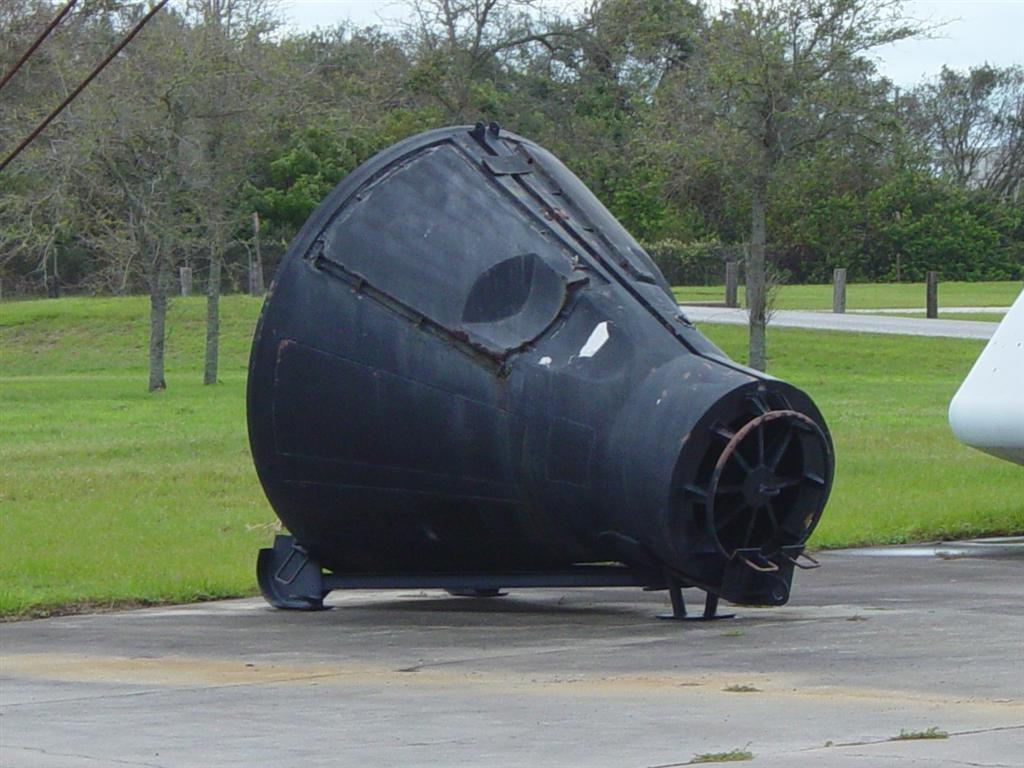
Gemini boilerplate, Air Force Space & Missile Museum.

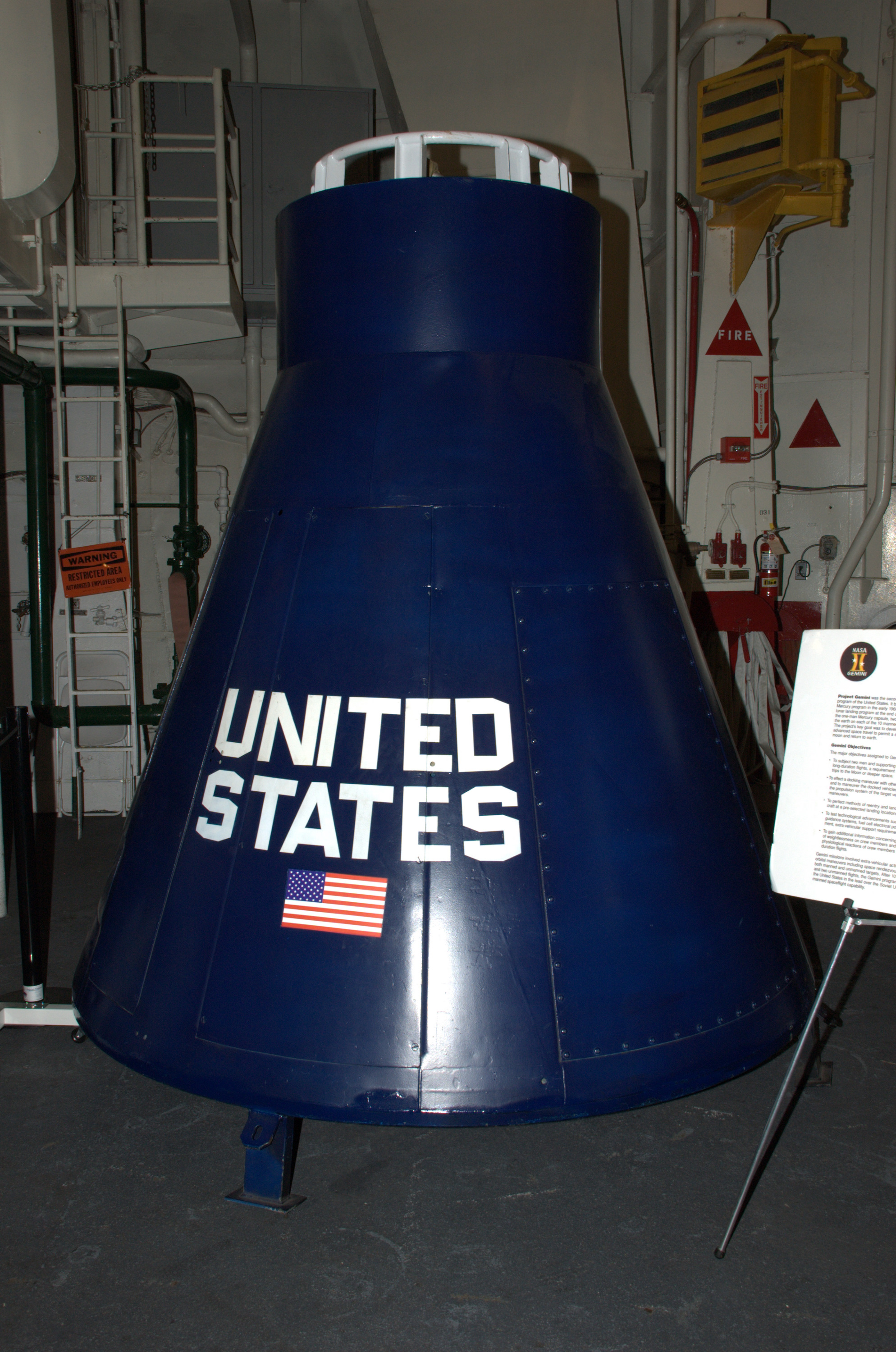
MSC-307, USS Hornet Museum

=== Mockups and models ===
A number of detailed Gemini models and mockups are on display:

- Gemini Model - Intrepid Sea, Air & Space Museum, New York
- Gemini Model - The Discovery Center, Fresno, California
- Gemini Model (built for From the Earth to the Moon)- Evergreen Aviation Museum, McMinnville, Oregon
- Gemini Sit-in Model - KSC Visitors Center, Kennedy Space Center, Florida
- Gemini Model - Science Museum Oklahoma, Oklahoma City, Oklahoma
- Gemini Model (made by McDonnell) - Boeing Prologue Room, St. Louis, Missouri
- Gemini Model (made by McDonnell) - Museum of Science & Industry, Chicago, Illinois
- Gemini Sit-in Model - Neil Armstrong Air and Space Museum, Wapakoneta, Ohio
- Gemini Mockup (winner of the 1967 Revell contest) - Oregon Museum of Science and Industry, Portland, Oregon
- Gemini Model (made by McDonnell) - San Diego Air & Space Museum, San Diego, California
- Gemini Model - Stafford Air & Space Museum, Weatherford, Oklahoma
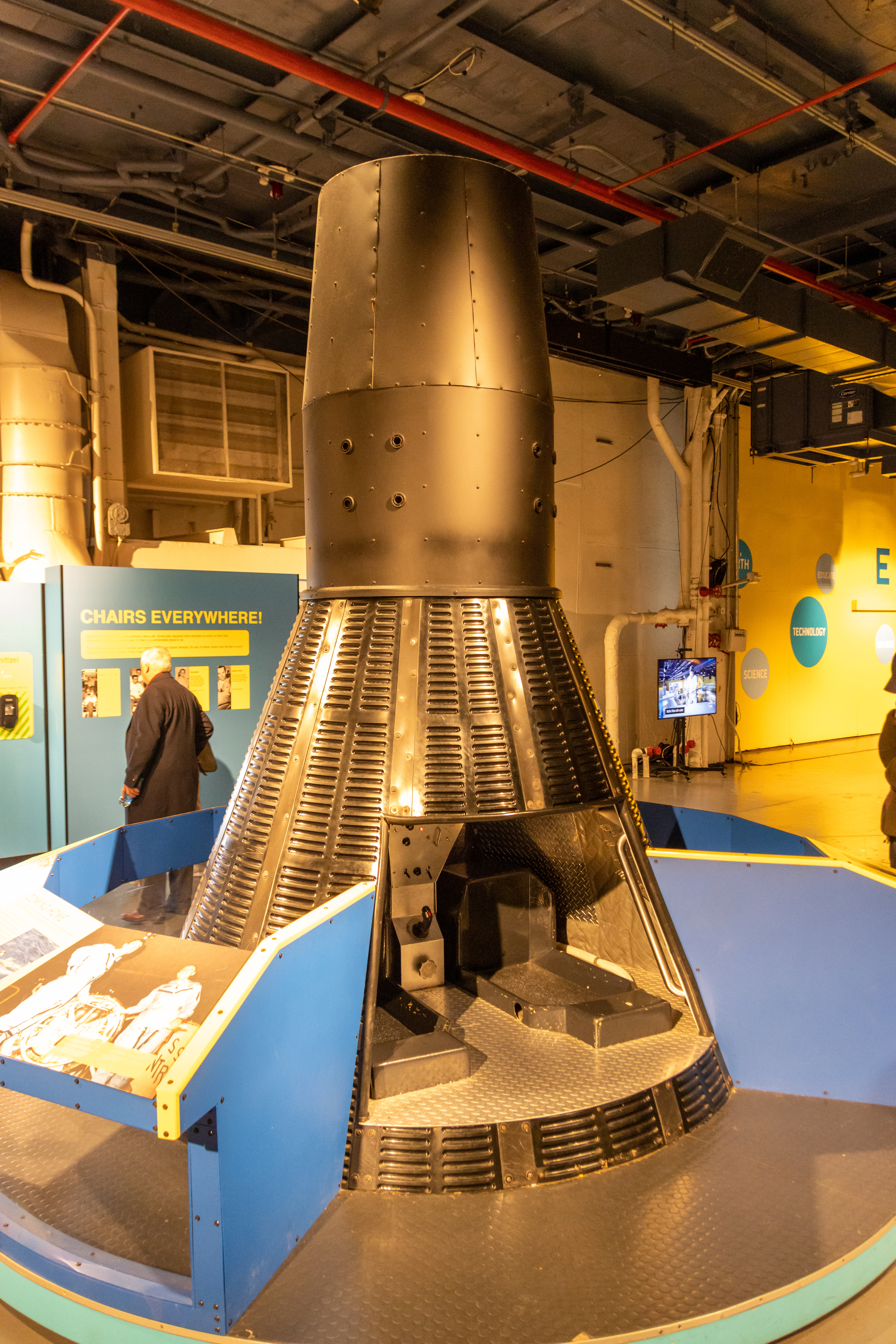
Gemini model, Intrepid Sea, Air & Space Museum.

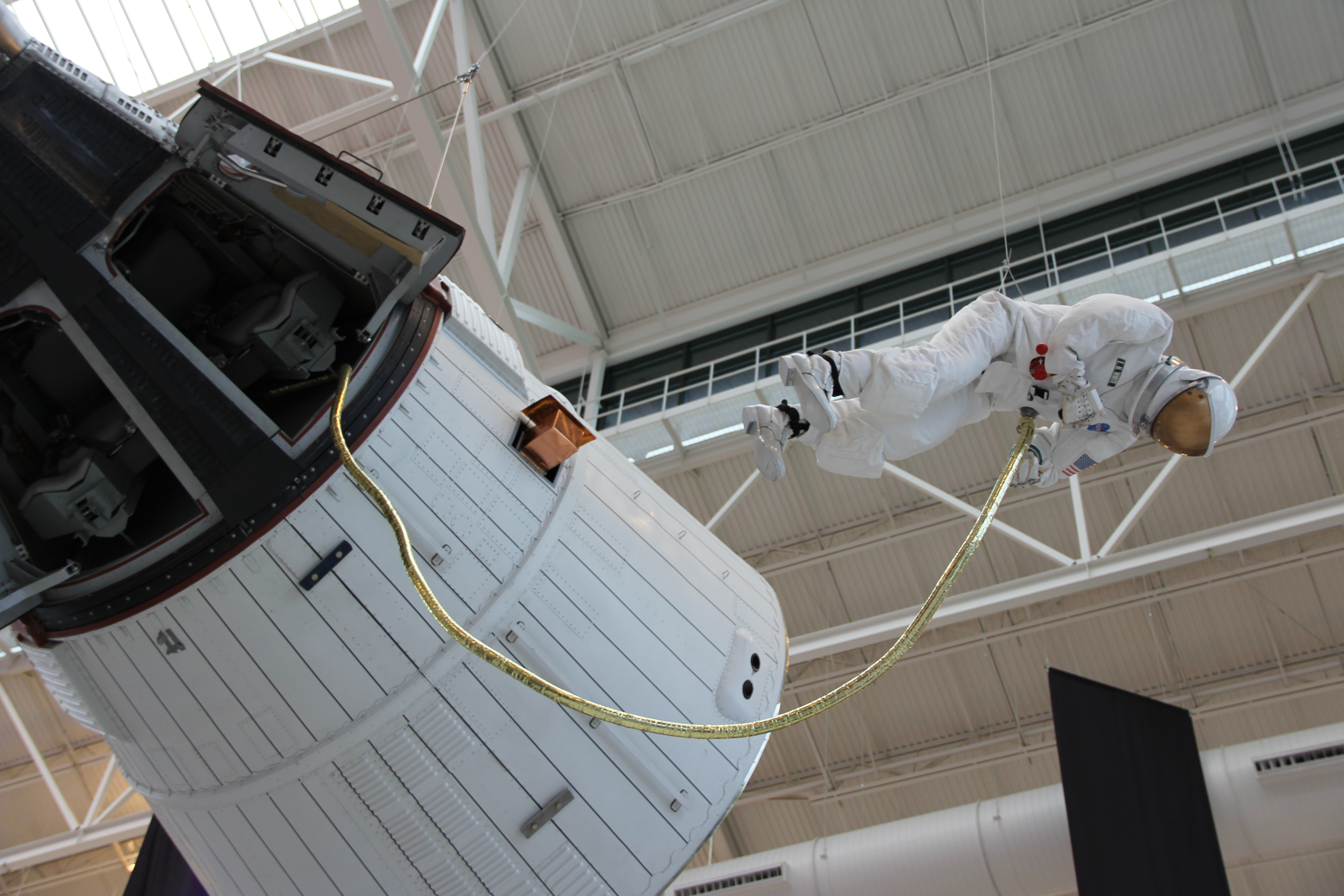
Gemini model, Evergreen Aviation Museum.

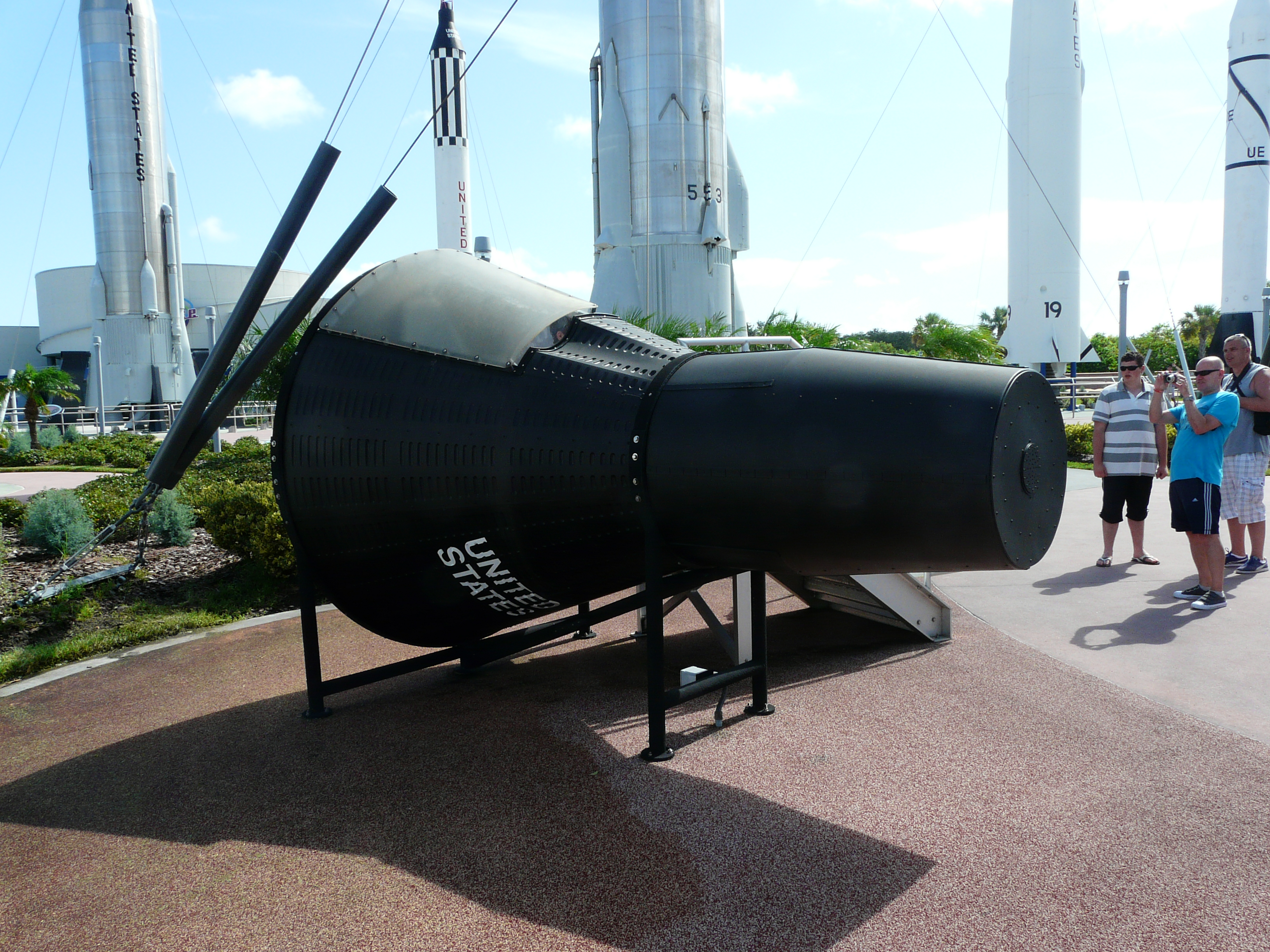
Gemini sit-in model, KSC Visitors Center.

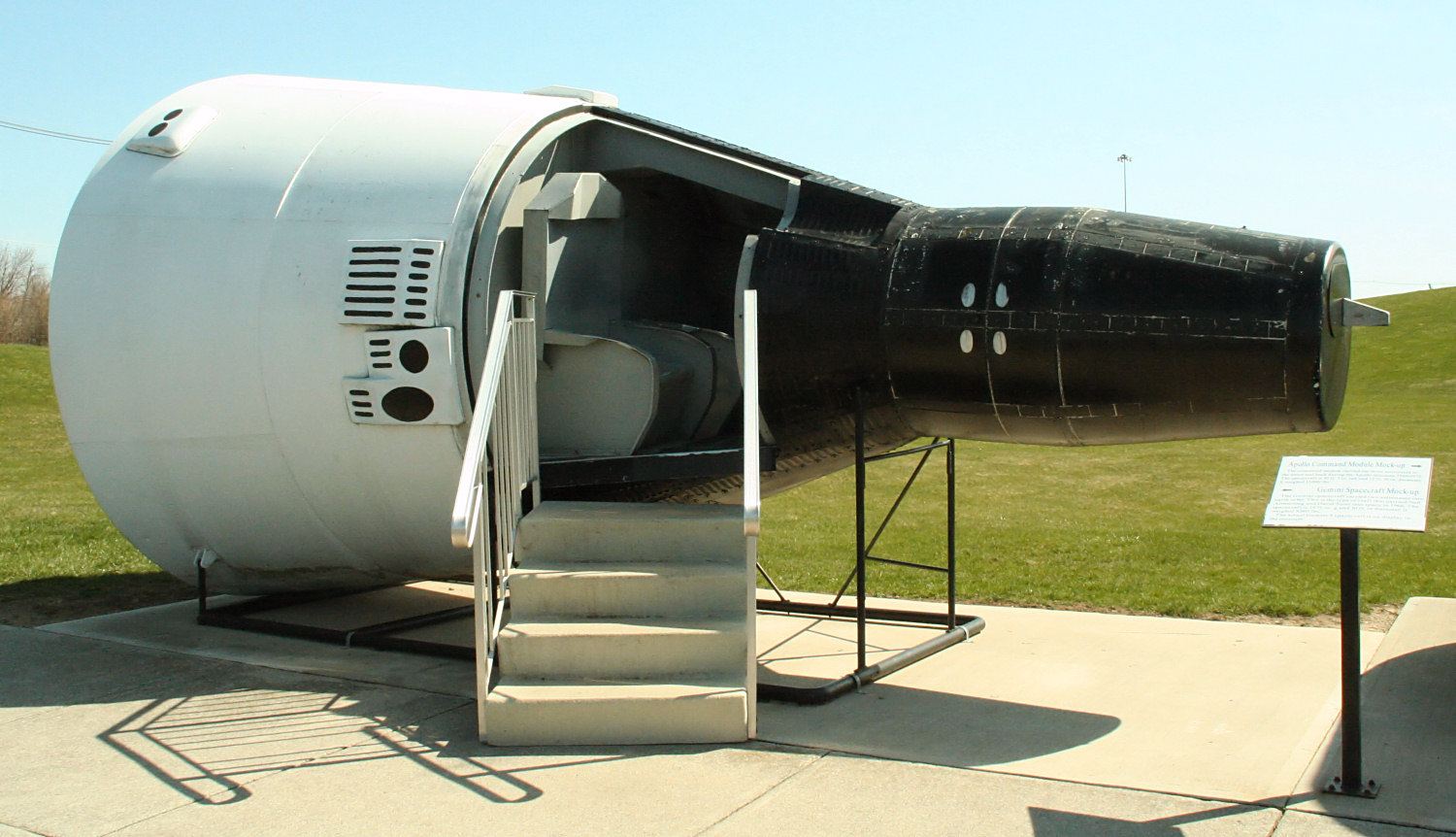
Gemini sit-in model, Neil Armstrong Air and Space Museum.

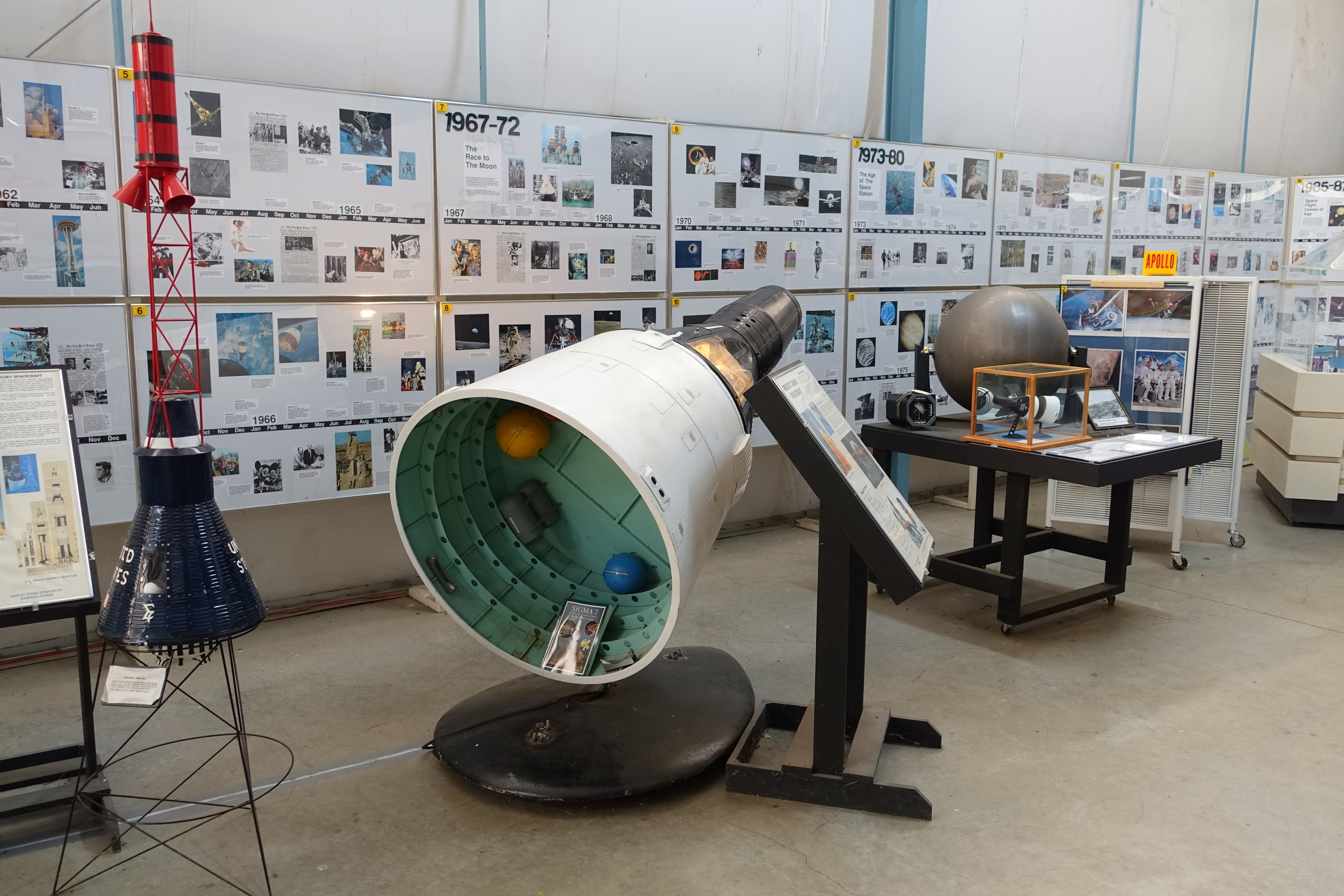
Gemini mockup, Oregon Air and Space Museum.

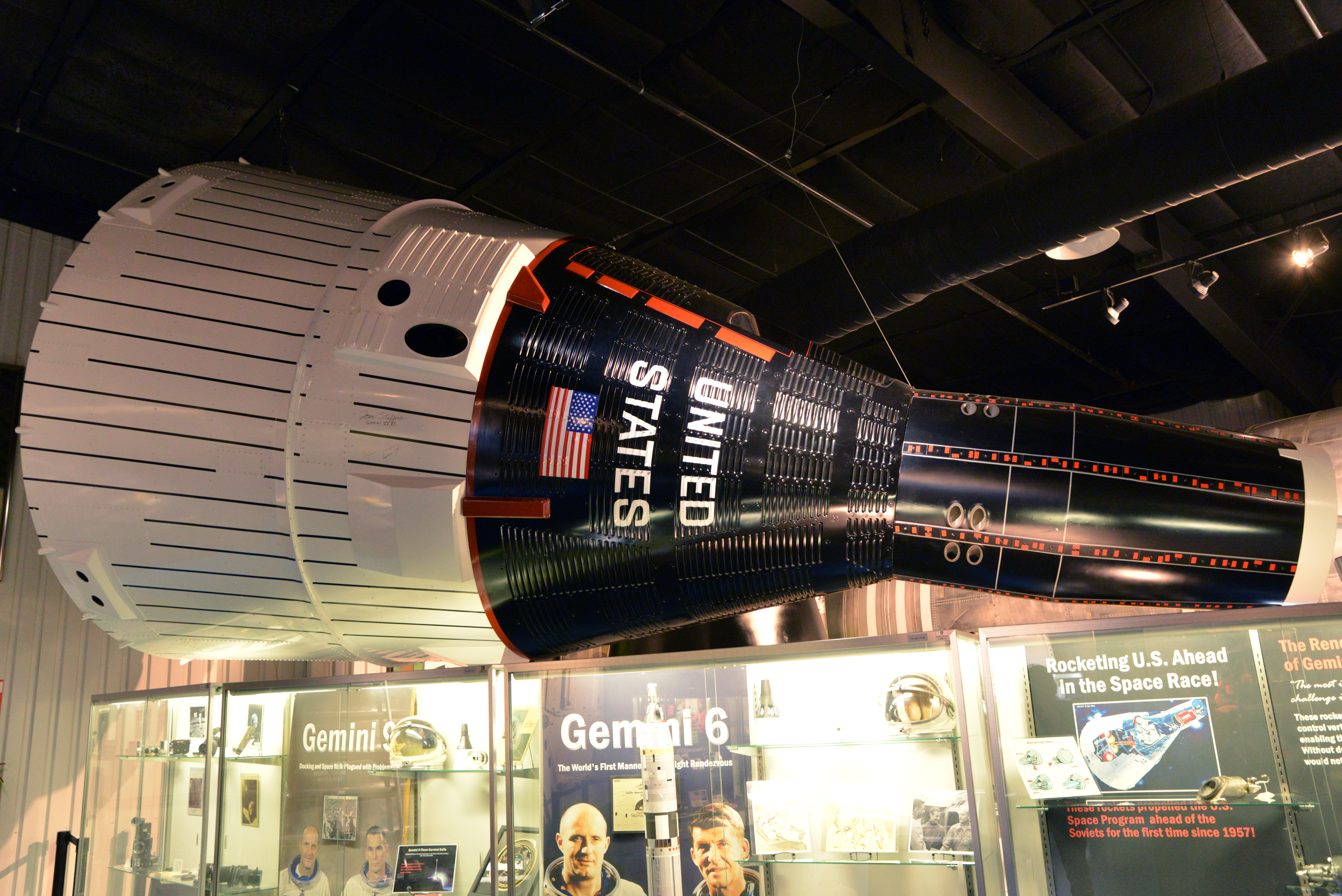
Gemini model, Stafford Air & Space Museum.

== Proposed extensions and applications ==
=== Advanced Gemini ===
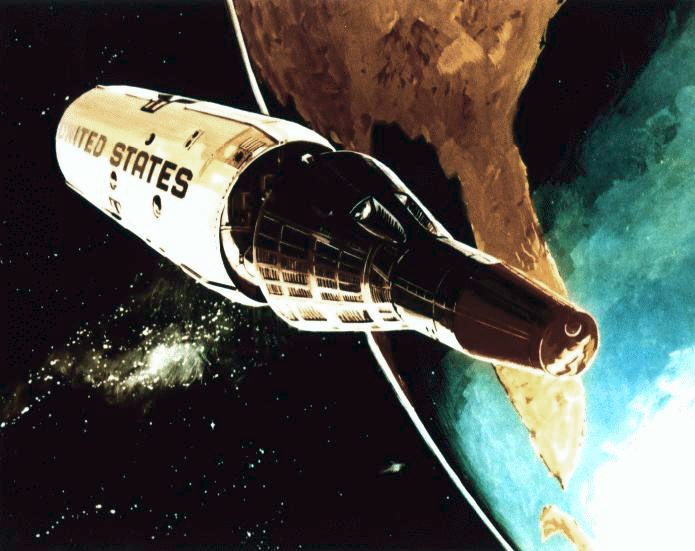
Illustration of a Gemini B reentry vehicle separating from the Manned Orbiting Laboratory (MOL).

McDonnell Aircraft, the main contractor for Mercury and Gemini, was also one of the original bidders on the prime contract for Apollo, but lost out to North American Aviation. McDonnell later sought to extend the Gemini program by proposing a derivative which could be used to fly a cislunar mission and even achieve a crewed lunar landing earlier and at less cost than Apollo, but these proposals were rejected by NASA.

A range of applications were considered for Advanced Gemini missions, including military flights, space station crew and logistics delivery, and lunar flights. The Lunar proposals ranged from reusing the docking systems developed for the Agena Target Vehicle on more powerful upper stages such as the Centaur, which could propel the spacecraft to the Moon, to complete modifications of the Gemini to enable it to land on the lunar surface. Its applications would have ranged from crewed lunar flybys before Apollo was ready, to providing emergency shelters or rescue for stranded Apollo crews, or even replacing the Apollo program. One proposal went as far as to using a modified Gemini as part of a crewed Mars expedition.

Some of the Advanced Gemini proposals used "off-the-shelf" Gemini spacecraft, unmodified from the original program, while others featured modifications to allow the spacecraft to carry more personnel, dock with space stations, visit the Moon, and perform other mission objectives. Other modifications considered included the addition of wings or a parasail to the spacecraft, in order to enable it to make a horizontal landing.

=== Big Gemini ===
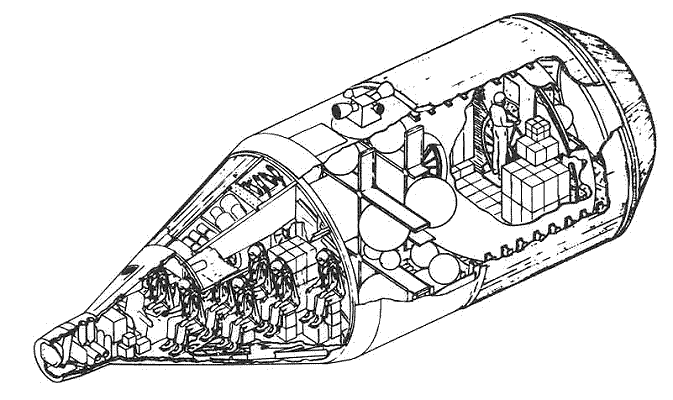
Big Gemini concept space station supply ship.

Big Gemini (or "Big G") was another proposal by McDonnell Douglas made in August 1969. It was intended to provide large-capacity, all-purpose access to space, including missions that ultimately used Apollo or the Space Shuttle.

The study was performed to generate a preliminary definition of a logistic spacecraft derived from Gemini that would be used to resupply an orbiting space station. Land-landing at a preselected site and refurbishment and reuse were design requirements. Two baseline spacecraft were defined: a nine-man minimum modification version of the Gemini B called Min-Mod Big G and a 12-man advanced concept, having the same exterior geometry but with new, state-of-the-art subsystems, called Advanced Big G. Three launch vehicles-Saturn IB, Titan IIIM, and Saturn INT-20 (S-IC/S-IVB) were investigated for use with the spacecraft.

=== Military applications ===
The Air Force had an interest in the Gemini system, and decided to use its own modification of the spacecraft as the crew vehicle for the Manned Orbital Laboratory. To this end, the Gemini 2 spacecraft was refurbished and flown again atop a mockup of the MOL, sent into space by a Titan IIIC. This was the first time a spacecraft went into space twice.

The USAF also thought of adapting the Gemini spacecraft for military applications, such as crude observation of the ground (no specialized reconnaissance camera could be carried) and practicing making rendezvous with suspicious satellites. This project was called Blue Gemini. The USAF did not like the fact that Gemini would have to be recovered by the US Navy, so they intended for Blue Gemini eventually to use the airfoil and land on three skids, carried over from the original design of Gemini.

At first some within NASA welcomed sharing of the cost with the USAF, but it was later agreed that NASA was better off operating Gemini by itself. Blue Gemini was canceled in 1963 by Secretary of Defense Robert McNamara, who decided the NASA Gemini flights could conduct necessary military experiments. MOL was canceled by Secretary of Defense Melvin Laird in 1969, when it was determined that uncrewed spy satellites could perform the same functions much more cost-effectively.

== In media ==
- Two Gemini capsules (codenamed "Jupiter" instead of "Gemini") are featured in the plot of the 1967 James Bond film You Only Live Twice.
- A modified one-man Gemini capsule is used to send an astronaut (played by James Caan) to the Moon in the 1968 film Countdown.
- Gemini 4, Gemini 8 and Gemini 12 feature in the first episode of the 1998 HBO series From the Earth to the Moon
- Like other US space programs, Gemini was covered in the 1985 PBS series "Spaceflight"
- Some aspects of the Gemini program relating to astronaut Neil Armstrong (played by Ryan Gosling) were touched upon in the 2018 film First Man, which depicts the launch of Gemini 8 and its rendezvous, docking, and the uncontrolled roll emergency during the mission.
- Many episodes of the television show I Dream of Jeannie featured launch pad and launch footage of various Gemini missions.
- Gemini, is a layer 7 telecom standard named after the Gemini missions. Its non-standard port number, 1965, is a reference to the first mission date.

== See also ==
- List of crewed spacecraft
- Splashdown (spacecraft landing)
- Timeline of hydrogen technologies
- US space exploration history on US stamps
