= Michael Collins (astronaut) =

American astronaut (1930–2021)

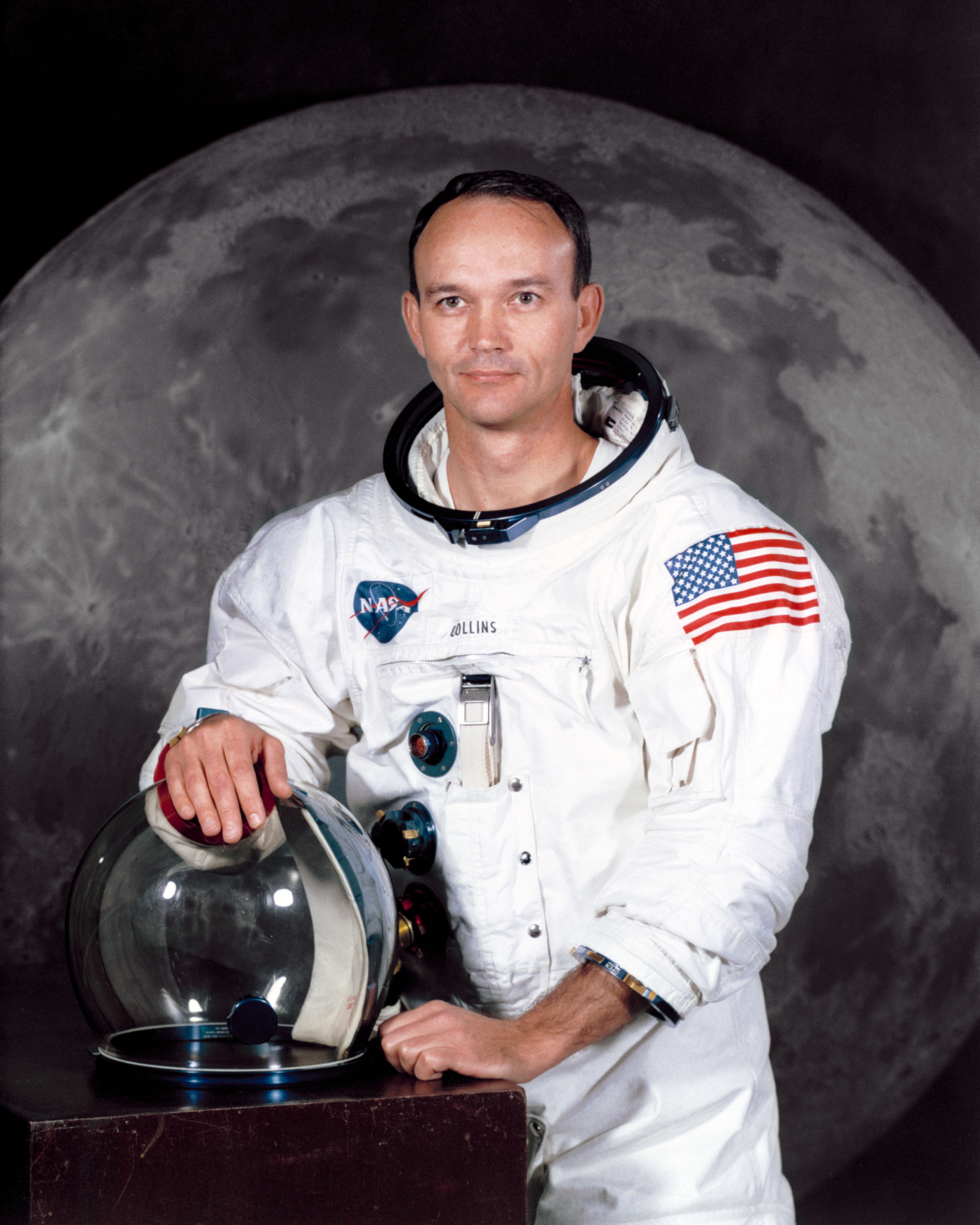
- Collins in 1969
- Born: October 31, 1930; Rome, Italy
- Died: April 28, 2021 (aged 90); Naples, Florida, U.S.
- Resting place: Arlington National Cemetery
- Education: United States Military Academy (BS)
- Awards: Air Force Distinguished Service Medal; Distinguished Flying Cross; Legion of Merit; Presidential Medal of Freedom; Congressional Gold Medal; NASA Distinguished Service Medal; NASA Exceptional Service Medal
- Spouse: Patricia Finnegan (m. 1957; died 2014)
- Children: 3, including Kate Collins
- Relatives: James Lawton Collins (father); James Lawton Collins Jr. (brother); J. Lawton Collins (uncle)
- Space career

NASA astronaut
- Rank: Major General, United States Air Force
- Time in space: 11d 2h 4m
- Selection: NASA Group 3 (1963)
- Total EVAs: 2
- Total EVA time: 1h 28m
- Mission: Gemini 10; Apollo 11
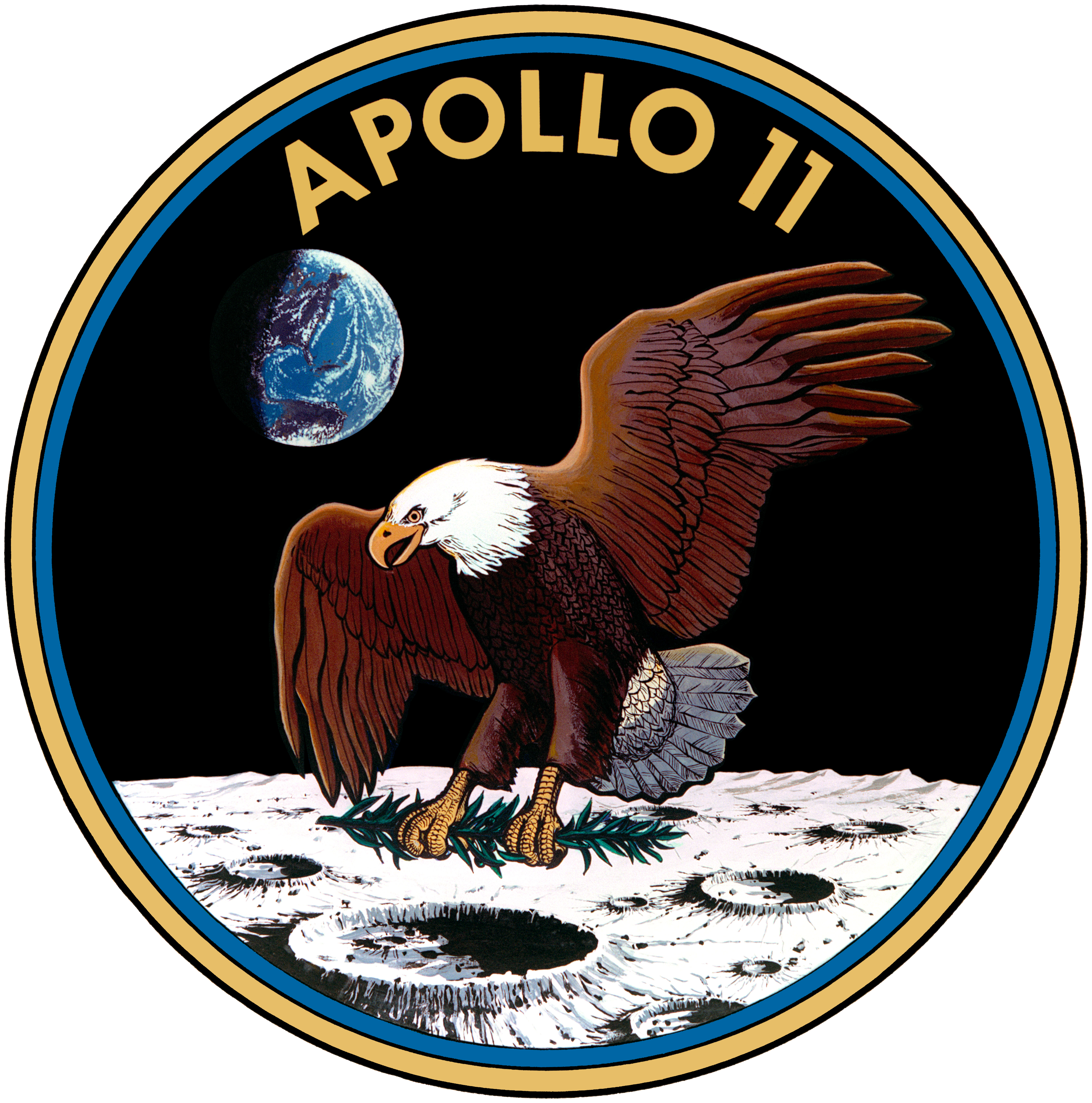
- Mission insignia

12th Assistant Secretary of State for Public Affairs
- In office January 6, 1970 – April 11, 1971
- President: Richard Nixon
- Preceded by: Dixon Donnelley
- Succeeded by: Carol Laise
- Military career
- Service years: 1952–1970 (active); 1970–1982 (reserve)

Michael Collins (October 31, 1930 – April 28, 2021) was an American astronaut who flew the Apollo 11 command module Columbia around the Moon in 1969 while his crewmates, Neil Armstrong and Buzz Aldrin, made the first crewed landing on the surface. He was also a test pilot and major general in the U.S. Air Force Reserve.

Born in Rome, where his father was serving as the U.S. military attaché, Collins graduated in the Class of 1952 from the United States Military Academy. He followed his father, brother, uncle, and cousin into the military. He joined the United States Air Force, and flew F-86 Sabre fighters at Chambley-Bussières Air Base, France. He was accepted into the U.S. Air Force Experimental Flight Test Pilot School at Edwards Air Force Base in 1960, also graduating from the Aerospace Research Pilot School (Class III).

Selected as part of NASA's third group of 14 astronauts in 1963, Collins flew in space twice. His first spaceflight was on Gemini 10 in 1966, in which he and Command Pilot John Young performed orbital rendezvous with two spacecraft and undertook two extravehicular activities (EVAs, also known as spacewalks). On the 1969 Apollo 11 mission, he became one of 24 Apollo astronauts to reach the Moon, which he orbited thirty times. He was the fourth person (and third American) to perform a spacewalk, the first person to achieve more than one spacewalk, and, after Young, who flew the command module on Apollo 10, the second person to orbit the Moon alone.

After retiring from NASA in 1970, Collins took a job in the Department of State as Assistant Secretary of State for Public Affairs. A year later, he became the director of the National Air and Space Museum, and held this position until 1978, when he stepped down to become undersecretary of the Smithsonian Institution. In 1980, he took a job as vice president of LTV Aerospace. He resigned in 1985 to start his own consulting firm. Along with his Apollo 11 crewmates, Collins was awarded the Presidential Medal of Freedom in 1969 and the Congressional Gold Medal in 2011.

== Early life ==
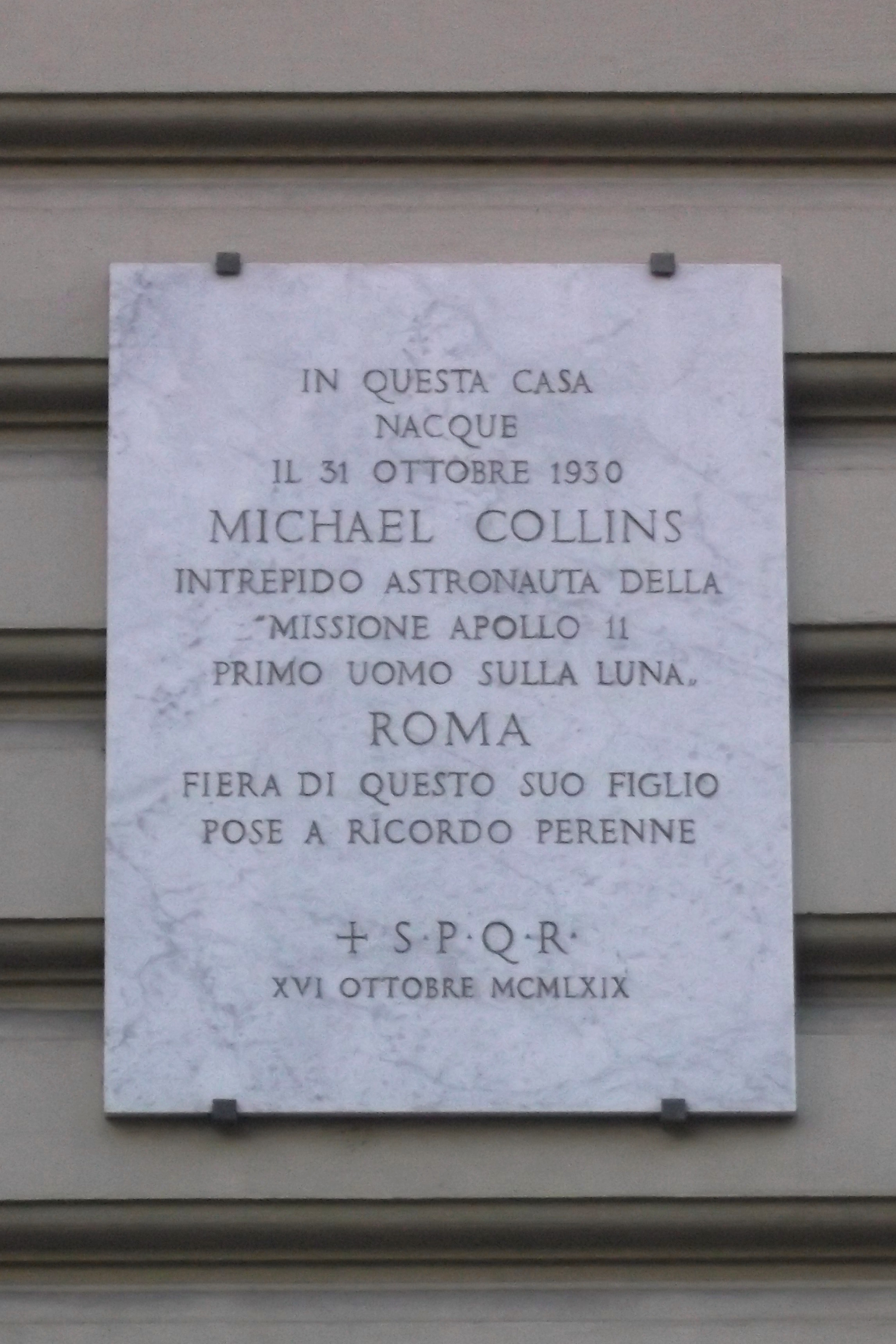
1969 commemorative plaque in via Tevere, Rome, marking Collins' birthplace

Michael Collins was born on October 31, 1930, in Rome, Kingdom of Italy. He was the second son of James Lawton Collins, a career U.S. Army officer, who was the U.S. military attaché there from 1928 to 1932, and Virginia C. Collins (née Stewart). Collins had an older brother, James Lawton Collins Jr. and two older sisters, Virginia and Agnes. Collins' mother was of British descent, and his father's family hailed from Ireland.

For the first 17 years of his life, Collins lived in many places as the Army posted his father to different locations: Rome; Oklahoma; Governors Island, New York; Fort Hoyle (near Baltimore, Maryland); Fort Hayes (near Columbus, Ohio); Puerto Rico; San Antonio, Texas; and Alexandria, Virginia. During his boyhood, Collins was an altar boy who served at the National Cathedral in Washington, D.C., but in his own words, he was "probably the only astronaut who had never been a Boy Scout". He took his first plane ride in Puerto Rico aboard a Grumman Widgeon; the pilot allowed him to fly it for a portion of the flight. He wanted to fly again, but since World War II started soon after, he was unable. He studied for two years in the Academia del Perpetuo Socorro in San Juan, Puerto Rico. After the United States entered World War II, the family moved to Washington, D.C., where Collins attended St. Albans School and graduated in 1948. His mother wanted him to enter the diplomatic service, but he decided to follow his father, two uncles, brother, and cousin into the armed services. He received an appointment to the United States Military Academy at West Point, New York, from which his father and his older brother had graduated in 1907 and 1939 respectively. He graduated on June 3, 1952, with a Bachelor of Science degree in military science, finishing 185th of 527 cadets in the class, which included future fellow astronaut Ed White.

Collins' decision to join the United States Air Force (USAF) was motivated by both the wonder of what the next fifty years might bring in aeronautics, and to avoid accusations of nepotism had he joined the Army — where his brother was already a colonel, his father had reached the rank of major general and his uncle, General J. Lawton Collins, was the Chief of Staff of the United States Army. The Air Force Academy, still under construction, would not graduate its first class for several years. In the interim, graduates of the Military Academy were eligible for Air Force commissions. Promotion was slower in the Air Force than in the Army, due to the large number of young officers who had been commissioned and promoted during World War II.

== Military service ==
=== Fighter pilot ===
Collins began basic flight training in the T-6 Texan at Columbus Air Force Base in Columbus, Mississippi, in August 1952, then moved on to San Marcos Air Force Base in Texas to learn instrument and formation flying, and finally to James Connally Air Force Base in Waco, Texas, for training in jet aircraft. Flying came easily to him, and unlike many of his colleagues, he had little fear of failure. He was awarded his wings upon completion of the course at Waco, and in September 1953, he was chosen for advanced day-fighter training at Nellis Air Force Base, Nevada, flying F-86 Sabres. The training was dangerous; 11 people were killed in accidents during the 22 weeks he was there.

This was followed by an assignment in January 1954 to the 21st Fighter-Bomber Wing at George Air Force Base, California, where he learned ground attack and nuclear weapons delivery techniques in the F-86. He moved with the 21st to Chambley-Bussières Air Base, France, in December 1954. He won first prize in a 1956 gunnery competition. During a NATO exercise that year, he was forced to eject from an F-86, near Chaumont-Semoutiers AB, after a fire started aft of the cockpit.

Collins met his future wife, Patricia Mary Finnegan from Boston, Massachusetts, in an officers' mess. A graduate of Emmanuel College, where she majored in English, she was a social worker, working mainly with single mothers. To see more of the world, she was working for the Air Force Service Club. After getting engaged, they had to overcome a difference in religion. Collins was raised nominally Episcopalian, while Finnegan came from a staunchly Roman Catholic family. Collins converted to Catholicism before their marriage. After seeking permission to marry from Finnegan's father, and delaying their wedding when Collins was redeployed to West Germany during the 1956 Hungarian Revolution, they married in 1957. They had a daughter, actress Kate Collins, in 1959, a second daughter, Ann, in 1961, and a son, Michael, in 1963.

After Collins returned to the United States in late 1957, he attended an aircraft maintenance officer course at Chanute Air Force Base, Illinois. He would later describe this school as "dismal" in his autobiography; he found the classwork boring, flying time scarce, and the equipment outdated. Upon completing the course, he commanded a Mobile Training Detachment (MTD) and traveled to air bases around the world. The detachment trained mechanics on the servicing of new aircraft, and pilots how to fly them. He later became the first commander of a Field Training Detachment (FTD 523) back at Nellis AFB, which was a similar kind of unit, except that the students traveled to him.

=== Test pilot ===
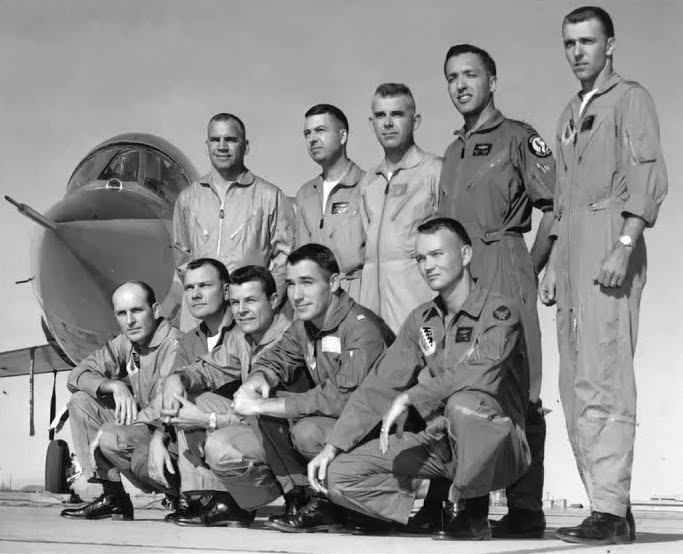
ARPS Class III graduates. Front row: Ed Givens, Tommie Benefield, Charles Bassett, Greg Neubeck and Collins. Back row: Al Atwell, Neil Garland, Jim Roman, Al Uhalt and Joe Engle

Collins' MTD posting allowed him to accumulate over 1,500 flying hours, the minimum required for admission to the USAF Experimental Flight Test Pilot School at Edwards Air Force Base, California. His application was successful, and on August 29, 1960, he became a member of Class 60C, which included Frank Borman, Jim Irwin and Tom Stafford, who later became astronauts. Military test pilot instruction started with the North American T-28 Trojan, and proceeded through the high performance F-86 Sabre, B-57 Canberra, T-33 Shooting Star, and the F-104 Starfighter. Collins was a heavy smoker, but quit in 1962 after suffering a particularly bad hangover. The next day, he spent what he described as the worst four hours of his life in the co-pilot's seat of a B-52 Stratofortress while going through the initial stages of nicotine withdrawal.

The inspiration for Collins in his decision to become a NASA astronaut was the Mercury Atlas 6 flight of John Glenn on February 20, 1962, and the thought of being able to circle the Earth in 90 minutes. Collins applied for the second group of astronauts that year. To raise the numbers of Air Force pilots selected, the Air Force sent their best applicants to a "charm school". Medical and psychiatric examinations at Brooks Air Force Base, Texas, and interviews at the Manned Spacecraft Center (MSC) in Houston followed. In mid-September, he found out he had not been accepted. It was a blow even though he did not expect to be selected. Collins rated the second group of nine as better than the Mercury Seven who preceded them, or the five groups that followed, including his own.

That year the USAF Experimental Flight Test Pilot School became the USAF Aerospace Research Pilot School (ARPS), as the Air Force tried to enter into space research through the X-15 and X-20 programs. Collins applied for a new postgraduate course offered into the basics of spaceflight. He was accepted into the third class on October 22, 1962. Other students in his eleven-member class included three future astronauts: Charles Bassett, Edward Givens and Joe Engle. Along with classwork, they also flew up to about 90,000 feet (27,000 m) in F-104 Starfighters. As they passed through the top of their arc, they would experience a brief period of weightlessness. On finishing this course he returned to fighter operations in May 1963.

At the start of June, NASA once again called for astronaut applications. Collins went through the same process as with his first application, though he did not take the psychiatric evaluation. He was at Randolph Air Force Base, Texas, on October 14 when Deke Slayton, the Chief of the Astronaut Office at NASA, called and asked if he was still interested in becoming an astronaut. Charles Bassett was also accepted. By this time Collins had flown over 3,000 hours, of which 2,700 were in jet aircraft.

== Space program ==
Compared with the first two groups of astronauts, the third group of fourteen astronauts, which included Collins, was younger, with an average age of 31—the first two groups had an average age of 34.5 and 32.5 at their time of selection—and was better educated, with an average of 5.6 years of tertiary education; but they had fewer flying hours—2,300 on average compared with 3,500 and 2,800 for the first two groups, and only eight of the fourteen were test pilots. Of the thirty astronauts selected in the first three groups, only Collins and his third group colleague William Anders were born outside the United States, and Collins was the only one with an older brother; all the rest were the eldest or only sons in their families. Training began with a 240-hour course on the basics of spaceflight. Fifty-eight hours of this was devoted to geology, something Collins did not readily understand and in which he never became very interested. At the end, Alan Shepard, the Chief of the Astronaut Office, asked the fourteen to rank their fellow astronauts in the order they would want to fly with them in space. Collins picked David Scott in the number one position.

=== Project Gemini ===
==== Crew assignments ====
After this basic training, the third group was assigned specializations. Collins received his first choice: pressure suits and extravehicular activities (EVAs, also known as spacewalks). His job was to monitor development and act as a liaison between the Astronaut Office and contractors. He was disturbed by the secretive planning of Ed White's EVA on Gemini 4, because he was not involved despite being the person with the greatest knowledge of the subject.

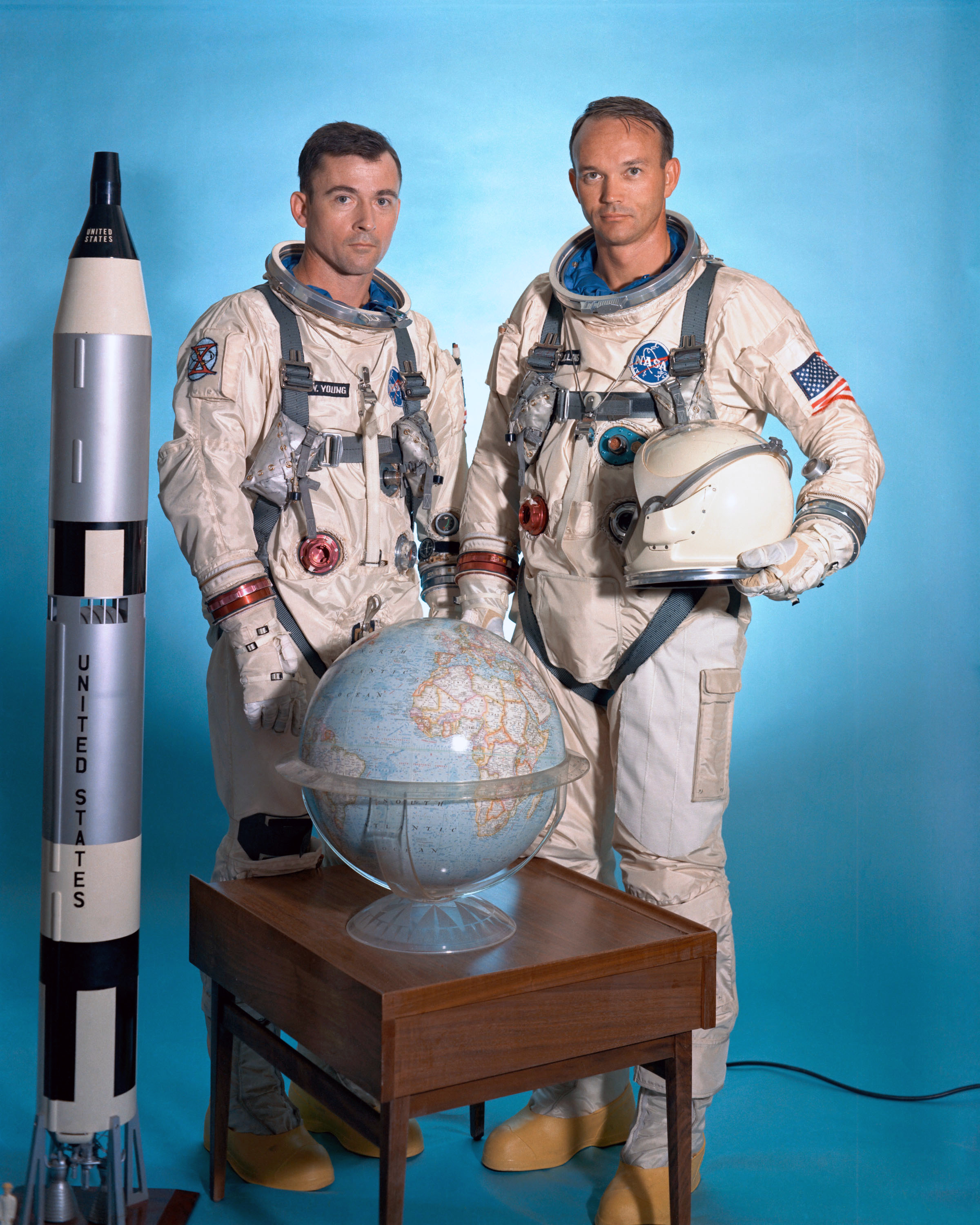
Collins (right) with John Young (left) and a model of their Gemini spacecraft and Titan II booster

In late June 1965, Collins received his first crew assignment: the backup pilot for Gemini 7, with his West Point classmate Ed White named as the backup mission commander. Collins was the first of the fourteen to receive a crew assignment, but the first to fly was Scott on Gemini 8, and Charles Bassett was assigned to Gemini 9. Under the system of crew rotation established by Slayton, being on the backup crew of Gemini 7 set Collins up to pilot Gemini 10. Gemini 7 was commanded by Borman, whom Collins knew well from their days at Edwards, with Jim Lovell as the pilot. Collins made a point of providing a daily briefing to their wives, Susan Borman and Marilyn Lovell, on the progress of the two-week Gemini 7 mission.

After the successful completion of Gemini 7 on January 24, 1966, Collins was assigned to the prime crew of Gemini 10, but with John Young as mission commander, as White moved on to the Apollo program. Jim Lovell and Buzz Aldrin were designated as the backup commander and pilot respectively. The arrangements were disturbed on February 28 by the deaths of the Gemini 9 crew, Charles Bassett and Elliot See, in the 1966 NASA T-38 crash. They were replaced on Gemini 9 by their backups, Stafford and Gene Cernan. Cernan was the second of the fourteen to fly in space. Lovell and Aldrin became their backups, and Alan Bean and C.C. Williams took their place as the Gemini 10 backup crew. Collins would be the seventeenth American, and third member of his group, to fly in space.

Training for Gemini 10 was interrupted in March when Slayton diverted Young, Collins and Williams to represent their respective services on a panel to select another group of astronauts, along with himself, Shepard, spacecraft designer Max Faget, and astronaut training officer Warren J. North. Young protested the loss of a week's training to no avail. Applying strict criteria for age, flying experience and education reduced the number of applicants to 35. The panel interviewed each for an hour, and rated nineteen as qualified. Collins was surprised when Slayton elected to take them all. Slayton later admitted that he too had doubts; he already had enough astronauts for Project Apollo as far as the first Moon landing, but post-Apollo plans were for up to 30 missions. Such a large intake therefore seemed prudent. Ten of the nineteen had test pilot experience, and seven were graduates of the ARPS.

==== Gemini 10 ====
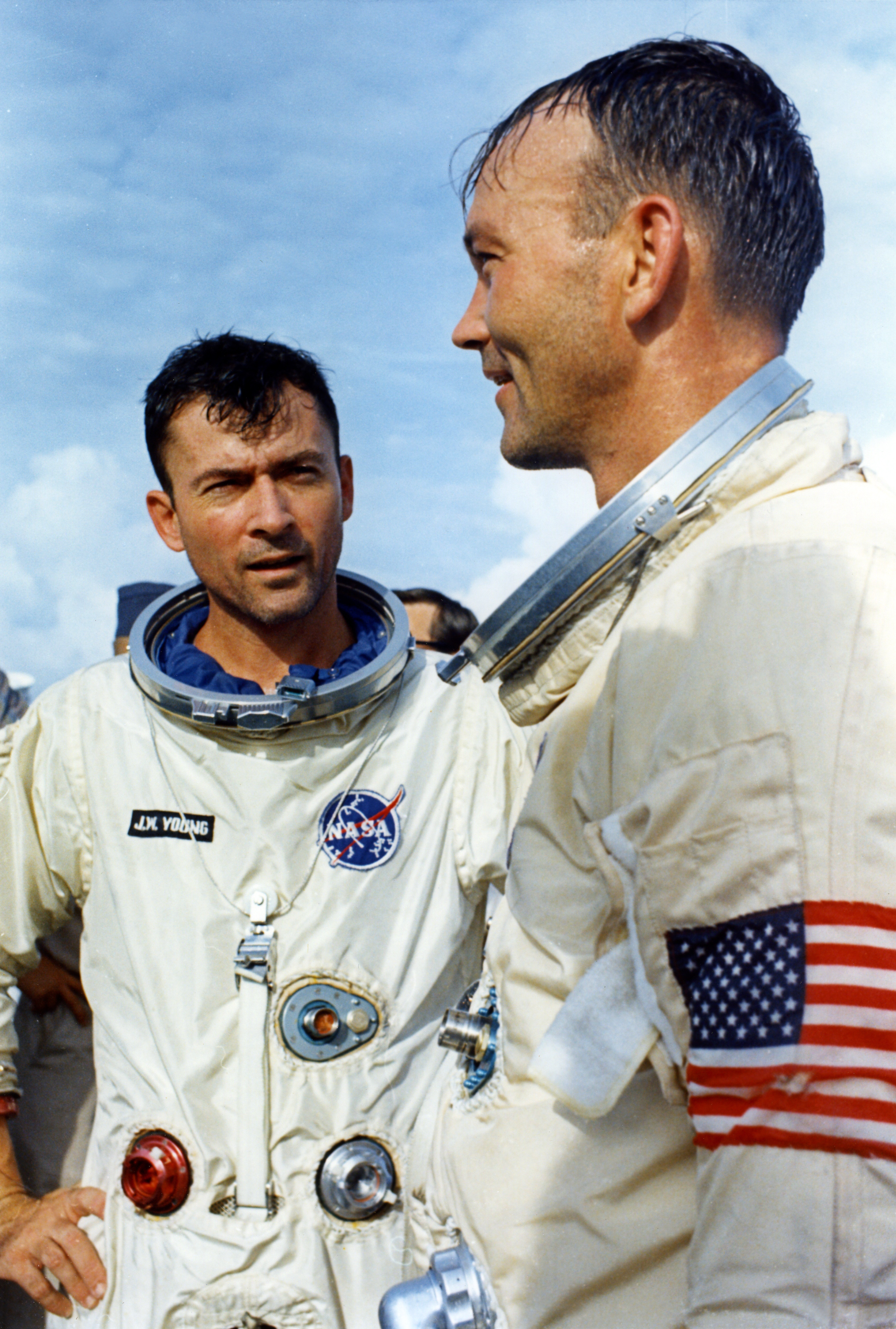
John Young (left) and Michael Collins aboard the recovery ship

Fifteen scientific experiments were carried on Gemini 10—more than any other Gemini mission except the two-week-long Gemini 7. After Gemini 9's EVA ran into problems, the remaining Gemini objectives had to be completed on the last three flights. While the overall number of objectives increased, the difficulty of Collins' EVA was scaled back significantly. There was no backpack or astronaut maneuvering unit (AMU), as there had been on Gemini 8.

Their three-day mission called for them to rendezvous with two Agena Target Vehicles, undertake two EVAs, and perform 15 different experiments. The training went smoothly, as the crew learned the intricacies of orbital rendezvous, controlling the Agena and, for Collins, the EVA. For what was to be the fourth ever EVA, underwater training was not performed, mostly because Collins did not have the time. To train to use the nitrogen gun he would use for propulsion, a smooth metal surface about the size of a boxing ring was set up. He would stand on a circular pad that used gas jets to raise itself off the surface. Using the nitrogen gun he would practice propelling himself across the "slippery table".

Gemini 10 lifted off from Launch Complex 19 at Cape Canaveral at 17:20 local time on July 18, 1966. Upon reaching orbit, it was about 860 nautical miles (1,600 km) behind the Agena target vehicle, which had been launched 100 minutes earlier. A rendezvous was achieved on Gemini 10's fourth orbit at 10:43, followed by docking at 11:13. The mission plan called for multiple dockings with the Agena target, but an error by Collins in using the sextant caused them to burn valuable propellant, resulting in Mission Control calling off this objective to conserve propellant. Once docked, the Agena 10 propulsion system was activated to boost the astronauts to a new altitude record, 475 miles (764 km) above the Earth, breaking the previous record of 295 miles (475 km) set by Voskhod 2.

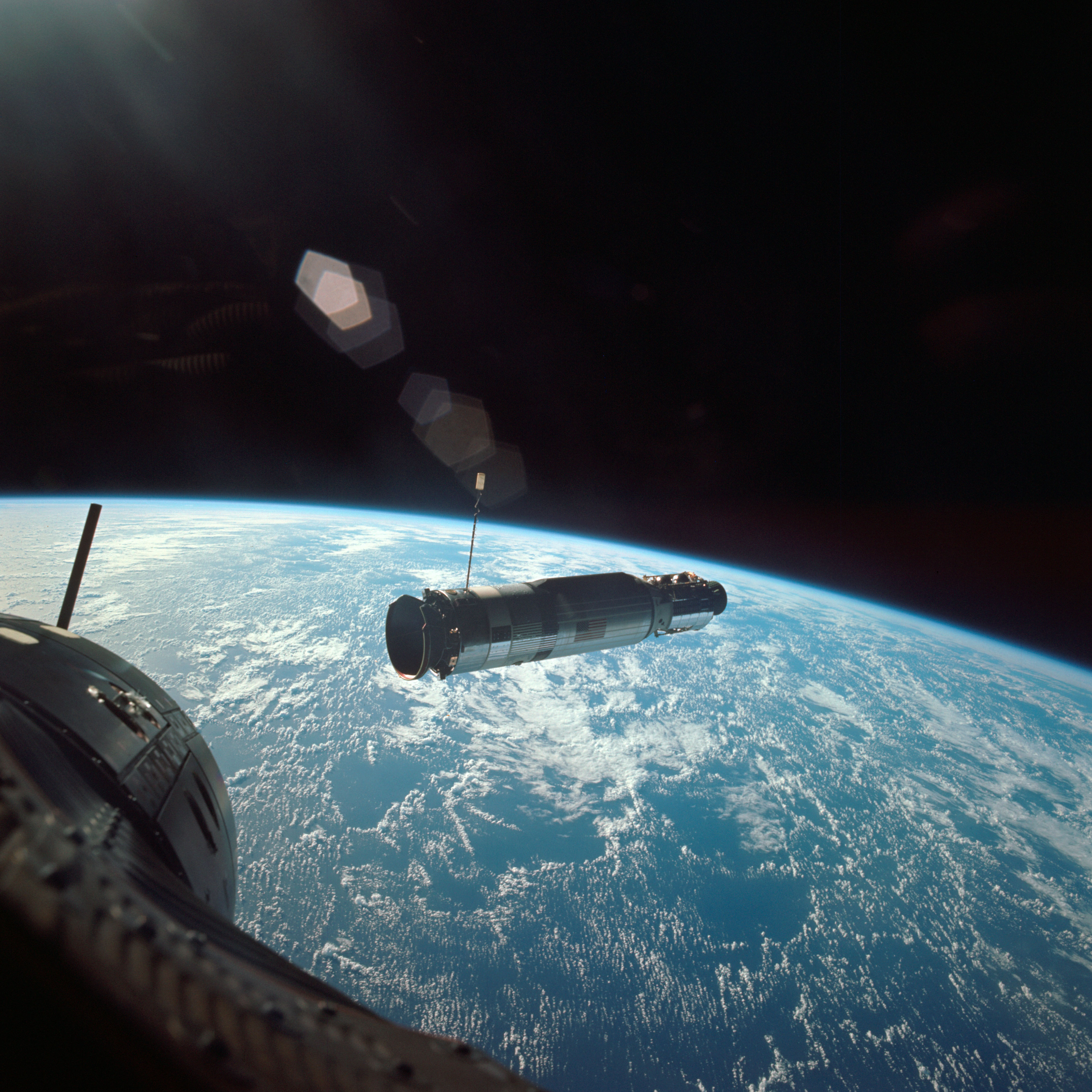
Agena Target Docking Vehicle photographed near the Gemini 10 spacecraft

A second burn of the Agena 10 engine at 03:58 on July 19 put them into the same orbit as Agena 8, which had been launched for the Gemini 8 mission on March 16. For his first EVA Collins did not leave the Gemini capsule, but stood up through the hatch with an ultraviolet camera. After he took the ultraviolet photos, Collins took photos of a plate they brought with them. They were used to compare photos taken in space with those taken in a laboratory. In his biography he said he felt at that moment like a Roman god riding the skies in his chariot.

The EVA started on the dark side of the Earth so Collins could take photos of the Milky Way. Collins' and Young's eyes began to water, forcing an early end to the EVA. Lithium hydroxide, which was normally used to remove exhaled carbon dioxide from the cabin, had accidentally been fed into the astronauts' space suits. The compressor causing the problem was switched off, and a high oxygen flow was used to purge the environmental control system.

Prior to Collins' second EVA, the Agena 10 spacecraft was jettisoned. Young positioned the capsule close enough to Agena 8 for Collins to get to it while attached to his 49-foot (15 m) umbilical. Collins became the first person to perform two spacewalks in the same mission. He found it took much longer to complete tasks than he expected, something Cernan also experienced during his spacewalk on Gemini 9. He removed a micrometeorite experiment from the exterior of the spacecraft, and configured his nitrogen maneuvering thruster. Collins had difficulty reentering the spacecraft, and needed Young to pull him back in with the umbilical.

The duo activated the retrorockets on their 43rd orbit, and they splashed down in the Atlantic at 16:06 on July 21, 3.5 nautical miles (6.5 km) from the recovery vessel, the amphibious assault ship USS Guadalcanal, and were picked up by helicopter. Collins and Young completed nearly all the major objectives of the flight. The docking practice and the landmark measurement experiment were cancelled in order to conserve propellant, and the micrometeorite collector was lost when it drifted out of the spacecraft.

=== Apollo program ===
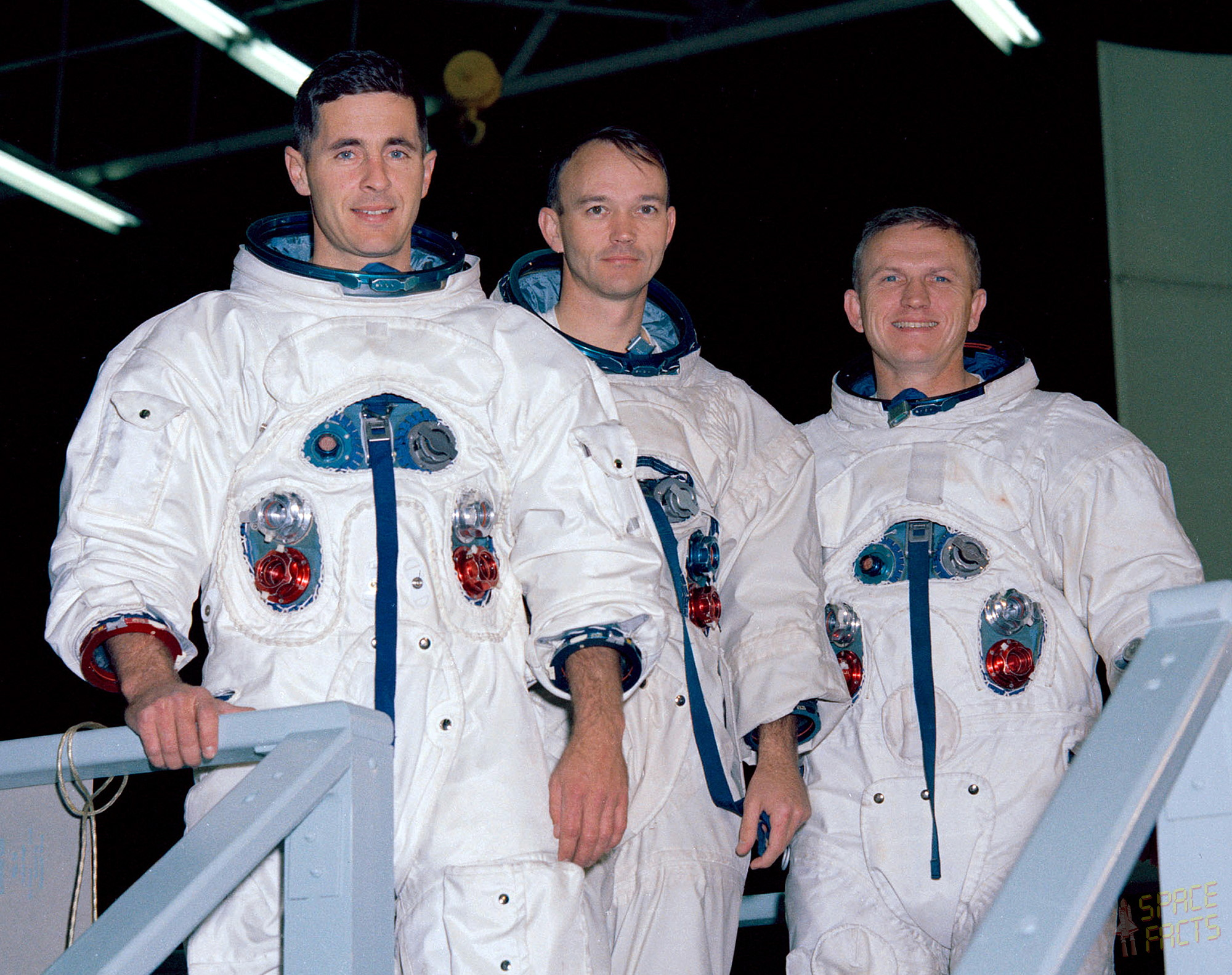
Collins (center) with William Anders (left) and Frank Borman (right)

Shortly after Gemini 10, Collins was assigned to the backup crew for the second crewed Apollo flight, with Borman as commander (CDR), Stafford as command module pilot (CMP), and Collins as lunar module pilot (LMP). Along with learning the new Apollo command and service module (CSM) and the Apollo Lunar Module (LM), Collins received helicopter training, as these were thought to be the best way to simulate the landing approach of the LM. After the completion of Project Gemini, it was decided to cancel the Apollo 2 flight, since it would just repeat the Apollo 1 flight. Stafford was given his own crew, and Anders was assigned to Borman's crew. Slayton had decided an Apollo mission commander should be an experienced astronaut who had already flown a mission, and that on flights with a LM, the CMP should also have some spaceflight experience, something Anders did not yet have, since the CMP would have to fly the CM alone. Collins was therefore moved to the CMP position on the Apollo 9 prime crew, and Anders became the LMP. The practice became that the CMP would be the next most senior member of the crew, and that they would go on to command later Apollo flights.

Staff meetings were always held on Fridays in the Astronaut Office, and it was here that Collins found himself on January 27, 1967. Don Gregory was running the meeting in the absence of Shepard and so it was he who answered the red phone to be informed there had been a fire in the Apollo 1 CM, and that the three astronauts, Gus Grissom, Ed White and Roger Chaffee were dead. When the enormity of the situation was ascertained, it fell on Collins to go to the Chaffee household to inform Martha Chaffee that her husband had died. The Astronaut Office had learned to be proactive in informing astronauts' families of a death quickly, because of the death of Theodore Freeman in an aircraft crash in 1964, when a newspaper reporter was the first to his house.

Collins and Scott were sent by NASA to the Paris Air Show in May 1967. There they met cosmonauts Pavel Belyayev and Konstantin Feoktistov, with whom they drank vodka on the Soviets' Tupolev Tu-134. Collins found it interesting that some cosmonauts were doing helicopter training like their American counterparts, and Belyayev said he hoped to make a circumlunar flight soon. The astronauts' wives had accompanied them on the trip, and Collins and his wife Pat were compelled by NASA and their friends to travel to Metz, where they had been married ten years before. There, they found a third wedding ceremony had been arranged for them (ten years previously they had already had civil and religious ceremonies), so they could renew their vows.

During 1968, Collins noticed his legs were not working as they should, first during handball games, then as he walked down stairs. His knee would almost give way, and his left leg had unusual sensations when in hot and cold water. Reluctantly he sought medical advice and the diagnosis was a cervical disc herniation, requiring two vertebrae to be fused. The surgery was performed at Wilford Hall Hospital at Lackland Air Force Base, Texas. The planned recuperation time was three to six months. Collins spent three months in a neck brace. As a result, he was removed from the prime crew of Apollo 9 and his backup, Jim Lovell, replaced him as CMP. When the Apollo 8 mission was changed from a CSM/LM mission in high Earth orbit to a CSM-only flight around the Moon, both prime and backup crews for Apollo 8 and 9 swapped places.

==== Apollo 8 ====
Having trained for the flight, Collins was made a capsule communicator (CAPCOM), an astronaut stationed at Mission Control responsible for communicating directly with the crew during a mission. As part of the Green Team, he covered the launch phase up to translunar injection, the rocket burn that sent Apollo 8 to the Moon. The successful completion of the first crewed circumlunar flight was followed by the announcement of the Apollo 11 crew of Armstrong, Aldrin, and Collins. At that time, in January 1969, it was uncertain this would be the lunar landing mission; this depended on the success of Apollo 9 and Apollo 10 testing the LM.

==== Apollo 11 ====
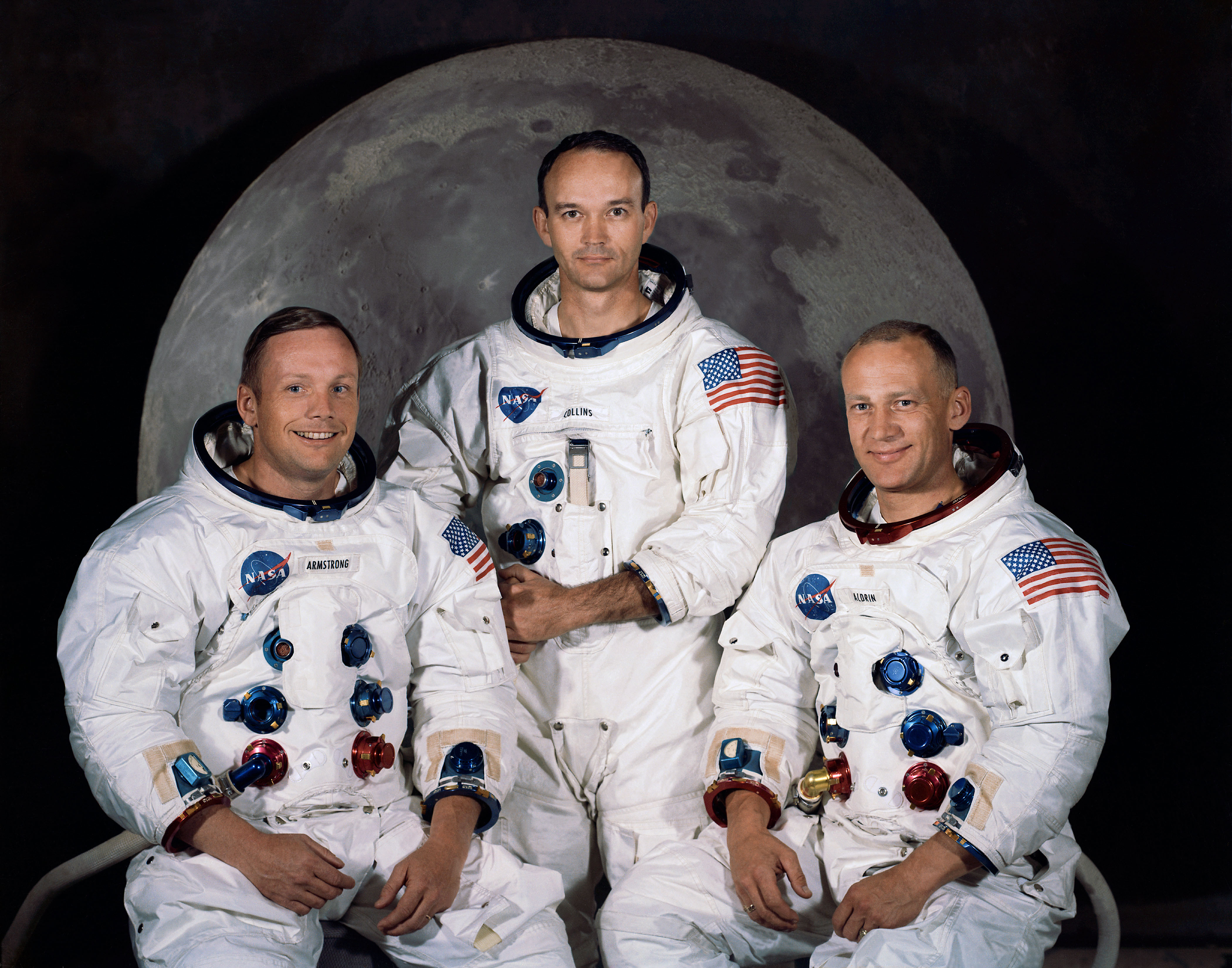
The crew of Apollo 11: from left to right, Neil Armstrong, Michael Collins and Buzz Aldrin.

As CMP, Collins' training was completely different from the LM and lunar EVA, and was sometimes done without Armstrong or Aldrin being present. Along with simulators, there were measurements for pressure suits, centrifuge training to simulate the reentry, and practicing docking with a huge rig at NASA Langley Research Center, Hampton, Virginia. Since he would be the active participant in the rendezvous with the LM, Collins compiled a book of 18 different rendezvous schemes for various scenarios including ones where the LM did not land, or it launched too early or too late. This book ran for 117 pages.

The mission patch of Apollo 11 was the creation of Collins. Jim Lovell, the backup commander, mentioned the idea of eagles, a symbol of the United States. Collins liked the idea and found a painting by artist Walter A. Weber in a National Geographic Society book, Water, Prey, and Game Birds of North America, traced it and added the lunar surface below and Earth in the background. The idea of an olive branch, a symbol of peace, came from a computer expert at the simulators. The call sign Columbia for the CSM came from Julian Scheer, the NASA Assistant Administrator for Public Affairs. He mentioned the idea to Collins in a conversation and Collins could not think of anything better.

During the training for Apollo 11, Slayton offered to get Collins back into the crew sequence after the flight. Collins would most likely have been the backup commander of Apollo 14, followed by commander of Apollo 17, but he told Slayton he did not want to travel to space again if Apollo 11 was successful. The difficult schedule of an astronaut strained his family life. He wanted to help achieve John F. Kennedy's goal of landing on the Moon within the decade and had no interest in further exploration of the Moon once the goal was achieved. The assignment was given to Cernan.

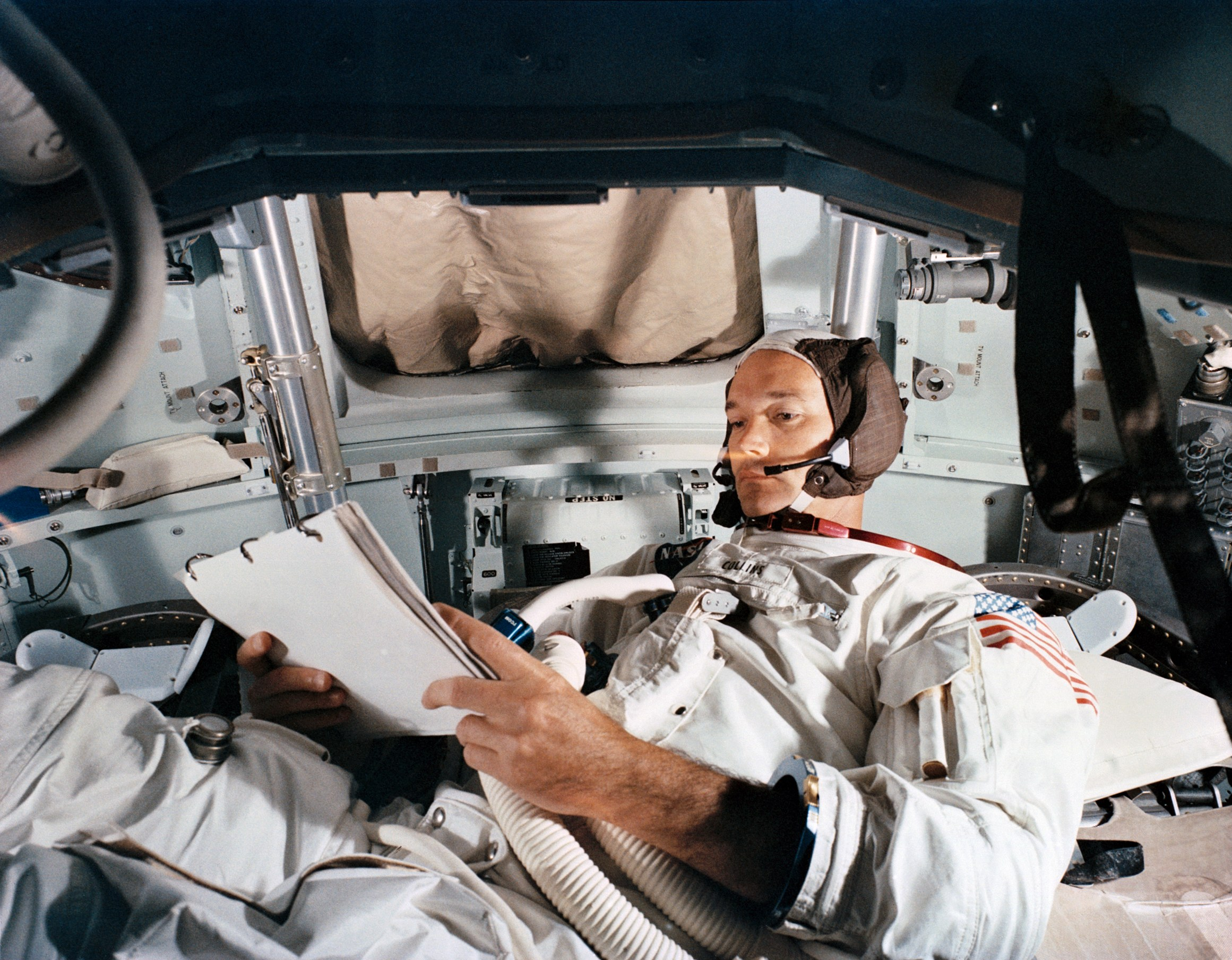
Collins in the command module simulator

An estimated one million spectators watched the launch of Apollo 11 from the highways and beaches in the vicinity of the launch site. The launch was televised live in 33 countries, with an estimated 25 million viewers in the United States alone. Millions more listened to radio broadcasts. Propelled by a giant Saturn V rocket, Apollo 11 lifted off from Launch Complex 39A at the Kennedy Space Center on July 16, 1969, at 13:32 UTC (09:32 EDT), and entered Earth orbit twelve minutes later. After one and a half orbits, the S-IVB third-stage engine pushed the spacecraft onto its trajectory toward the Moon. About 30 minutes later, Collins performed the transposition, docking, and extraction maneuver. This involved separating Columbia from the spent S-IVB stage, turning around, and docking with the Lunar Module Eagle. After it was extracted, the combined spacecraft headed for the Moon, while the rocket stage flew on a trajectory past it.

On July 19 at 17:21:50 UTC, Apollo 11 passed behind the Moon and fired its service propulsion engine to enter lunar orbit. In the thirty orbits that followed, the crew saw passing views of their landing site in the southern Sea of Tranquillity about 12 miles (19 km) southwest of the crater Sabine D. At 12:52:00 UTC on July 20, Aldrin and Armstrong entered Eagle and began the final preparations for lunar descent. At 17:44:00 Eagle separated from Columbia. Collins, alone aboard Columbia, inspected Eagle as it rotated before him to ensure the craft was not damaged and that the landing gear had correctly deployed before heading for the surface.

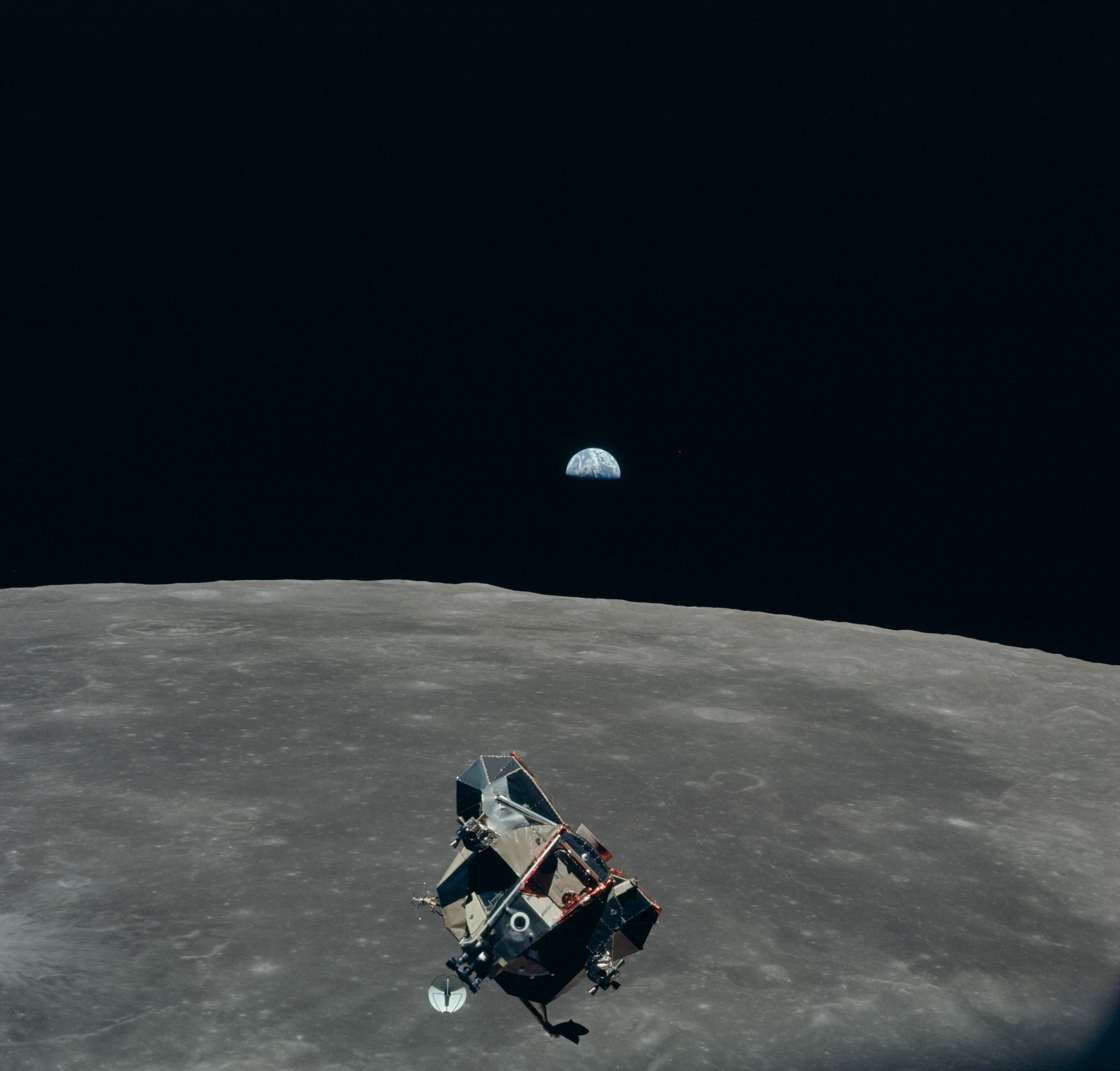
Photograph of Eagle and Earth by Collins

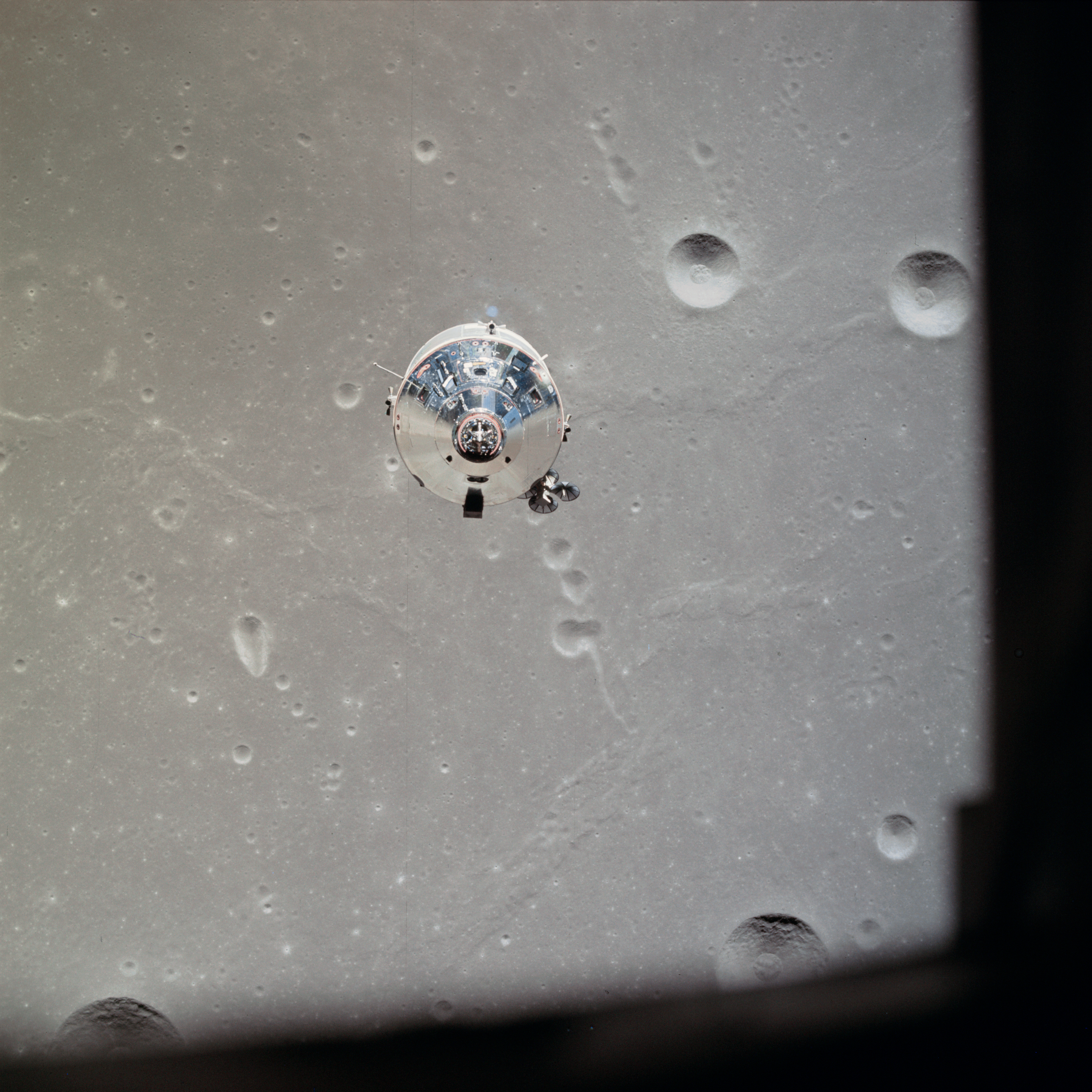
Columbia in lunar orbit and piloted by Collins alone, photographed from Eagle

During his day flying solo around the Moon, Collins never felt lonely. Although Mission Control speculated in that day's log that "not since Adam has any human known such solitude", Collins felt very much a part of the mission. In his autobiography he wrote "this venture has been structured for three men, and I consider my third to be as necessary as either of the other two". In the 48 minutes of each orbit when he was out of radio contact with the Earth while Columbia passed round the far side of the Moon, the feeling he reported was not fear or loneliness, but rather "awareness, anticipation, satisfaction, confidence, almost exultation".

One of Collins' first tasks was to identify the lunar module on the ground. To give Collins an idea where to look, Mission Control radioed that they believed the lunar module landed about four miles off target. Each time he passed over the suspected landing site, he tried in vain to find the lunar module. On his first two orbits on the far side of the Moon, Collins performed maintenance activities such as dumping excess water produced by the fuel cells and preparing the cabin for Armstrong and Aldrin to return. Columbia orbited the Moon thirty times.

Just before he reached the far side on the third orbit, Mission Control informed Collins there was a problem with the temperature of the coolant. If it became too cold, parts of Columbia might freeze. Mission Control advised him to assume manual control and implement Environmental Control System Malfunction Procedure 17. Instead, Collins flicked the switch on the offending system from automatic to manual and back to automatic again, and carried on with normal housekeeping chores, while keeping an eye on the temperature. When Columbia came back around to the near side of the Moon again, he was able to report that the problem had been resolved. For the next couple of orbits, he described his time on the far side of the Moon as "relaxing". After Aldrin and Armstrong completed their EVA, Collins slept so he could be rested for the rendezvous. While the flight plan called for Eagle to meet up with Columbia, Collins was prepared for certain contingencies in which he would fly Columbia down to meet Eagle. After spending so much time with the CSM, he felt compelled to leave his mark on it, so during the second night following their return from the Moon, he went to the lower equipment bay of the CM and wrote:

"Spacecraft 107 – alias Apollo 11 – alias Columbia. The best ship to come down the line. God Bless Her. Michael Collins, CMP"

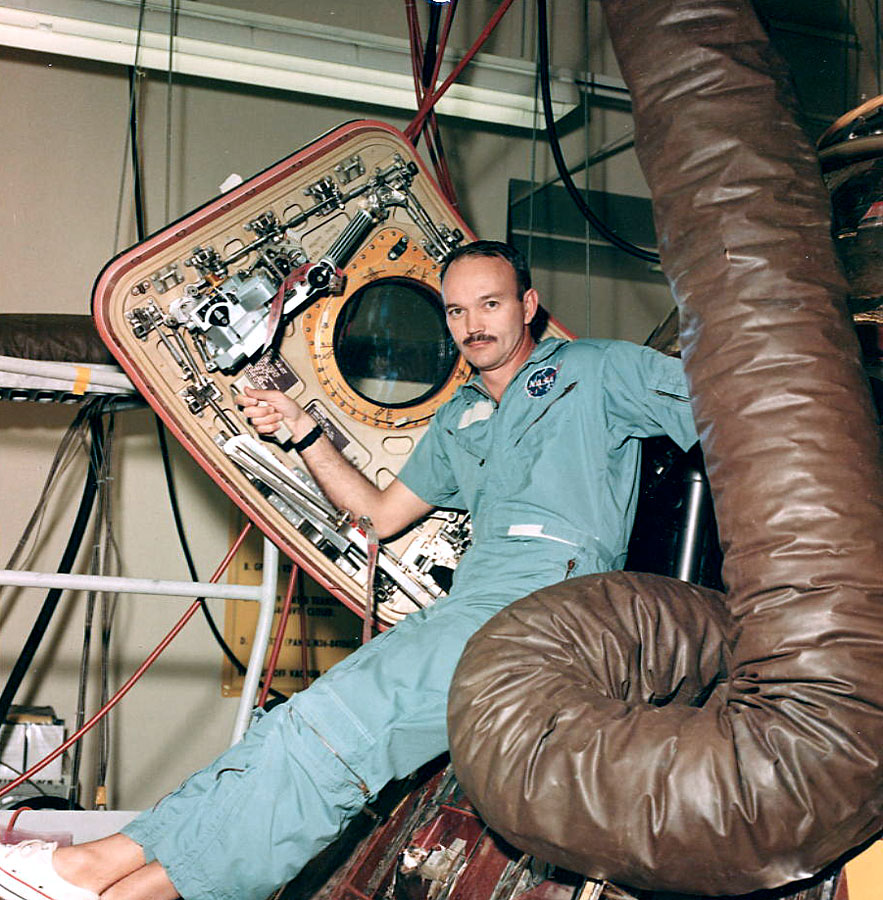
Collins sits in the hatch of the Apollo 11 command module after its return to the MSC's Lunar Receiving Laboratory for detailed examination

In a July 2009 interview with The Guardian, Collins said that he was very worried about Armstrong and Aldrin's safety. He was also concerned in the event of their deaths on the Moon, he would be forced to return to Earth alone and, as the mission's sole survivor, be regarded as "a marked man for life".

At 17:54 UTC on July 21, Eagle lifted off from the Moon to rejoin Collins aboard Columbia in lunar orbit. After rendezvous with Columbia, the ascent stage was jettisoned into lunar orbit, and Columbia made its way back to Earth.

Columbia splashed down in the Pacific Ocean 1,440 nmi (2,660 km) east of Wake Island at 16:50 UTC (05:50 local time) on July 24. The total mission duration was eight days, three hours, 18 minutes, and thirty-five seconds. Divers passed biological isolation garments (BIGs) to the astronauts, and assisted them into the life raft. Though the chance of bringing back pathogens from the lunar surface was believed to be remote, it was still considered a possibility. The astronauts were winched on board the recovery helicopter, and flown to the aircraft carrier USS Hornet, where they spent the first part of the Earth-based portion of 21 days of quarantine (time in space was also counted), before moving on to Houston.

On August 13, the three astronauts rode in parades in their honor in New York and Chicago, with about six million attendees. On the same evening in Los Angeles there was an official state dinner to celebrate the flight, attended by members of Congress, 44 governors, the Chief Justice of the United States, and ambassadors from 83 nations at the Century Plaza Hotel. In September, the astronauts embarked on a 38-day world tour that brought them to 22 foreign countries and included visits with world leaders.

== Post-NASA activities ==
=== Political career ===
==== Assistant Secretary of State for Public Affairs ====
NASA Administrator Thomas O. Paine told Collins that Secretary of State William P. Rogers was interested in appointing Collins to the position of Assistant Secretary of State for Public Affairs. After the crew returned to the U.S. in November, Collins sat down with Rogers and accepted the position on the urgings of President Richard Nixon. He was an unusual choice for the role, as he was neither a journalist nor a career diplomat. Additionally, unlike some of his predecessors, he did not act as the department's primary spokesperson. Instead, as the head of the State Department's Bureau of Public Affairs, his role was that of managing relations with the public at large. He had a staff of 115 and a budget of $2.5 million, but this was small compared to the 6,000 public affairs staff at the United States Department of Defense.

Collins was appointed to the position on December 15, 1969, and began his work on January 6, 1970. He took over at a very difficult time. The Vietnam War was going badly, and the invasion of Cambodia and the Kent State shootings had triggered a wave of protests and unrest across the country. He had no illusions about his ability to change minds, but attempted to engage with the public all the same, playing on his Apollo 11 fame. He attributed part of the nation's problems to insularity. In a 1970 commencement speech at Saint Michael's College in Vermont, he told his audience that "Farmers speak to farmers, students to students, business leaders to other business leaders, but this intramural talk serves mainly to mirror one's beliefs, to reinforce existing prejudices, to lock out opposing views".

Collins realized he was not enjoying the job, and secured President Nixon's permission to become the Director of the National Air and Space Museum. His departure was officially announced on February 22, 1971, and his term as Assistant Secretary of State for Public Affairs ended on April 11, 1971. The position remained vacant until Carol Laise succeeded him in October 1973.

=== Director of the National Air and Space Museum ===
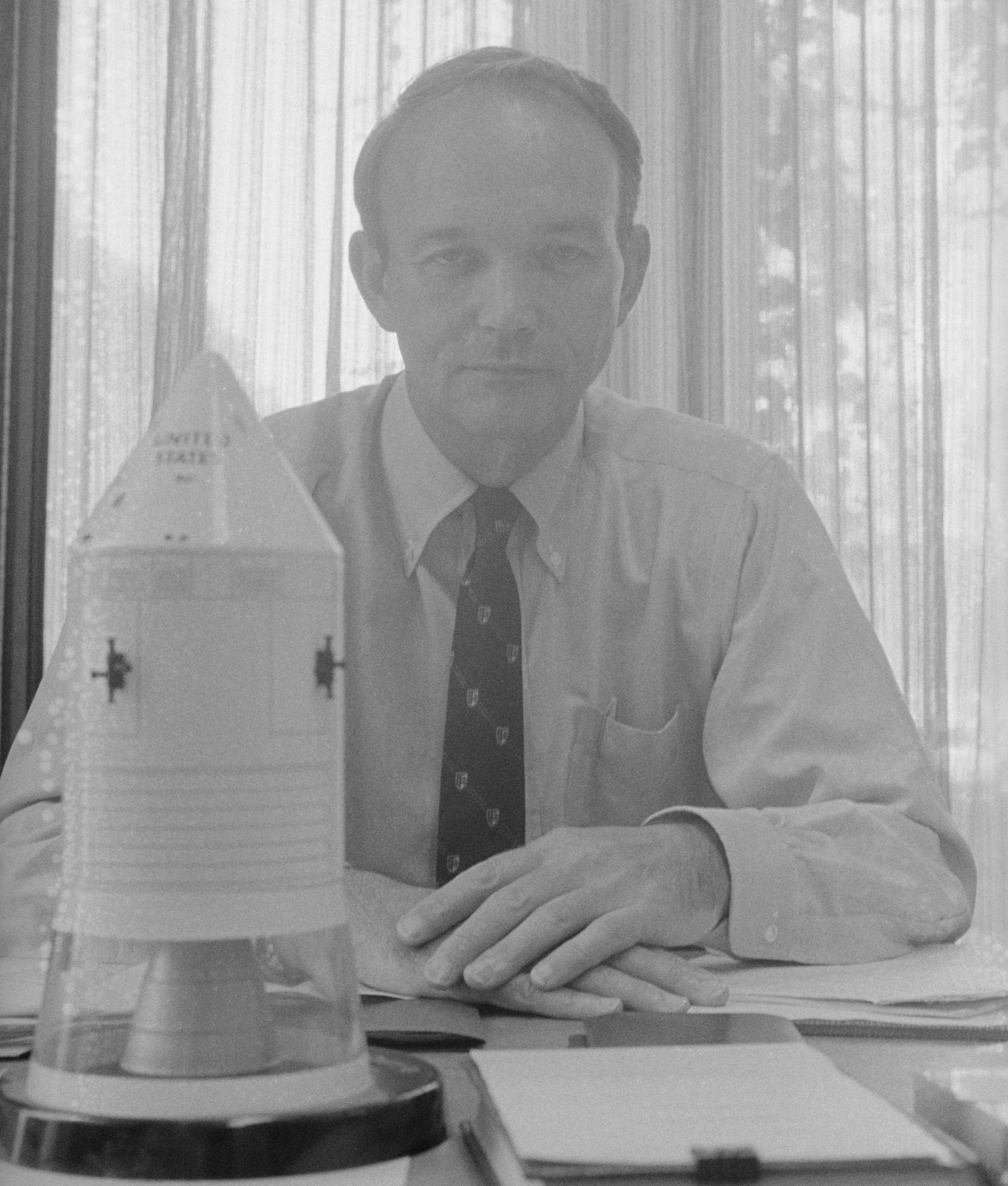
Michael Collins at the Smithsonian in 1974

On August 12, 1946, Congress passed an authorization bill for a National Air Museum, to be administered by the Smithsonian Institution, and located on the National Mall in Washington, D.C. Under the U.S. legislative system, authorization is insufficient; Congress also has to pass an appropriation bill allocating funding. Since this was not done, there was no money for the museum building.

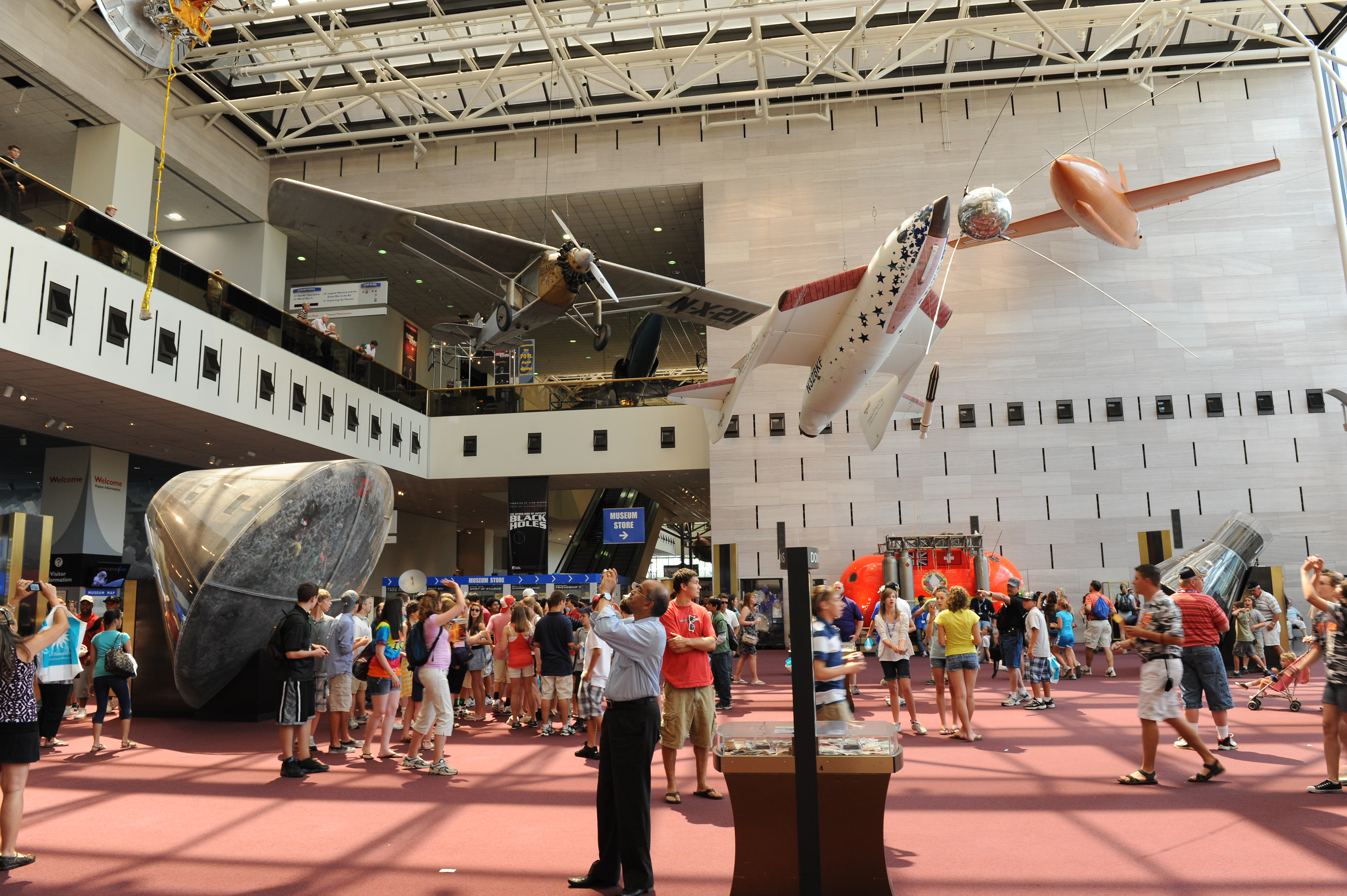
The Milestones of Flight Hall of the National Air and Space Museum in Washington, D.C.

The 1957 Sputnik crisis and the resulting Space Race led to a surge of public interest in space exploration. The Freedom 7 and Friendship 7 Project Mercury spacecraft were donated to the Smithsonian, and 2,670,000 visitors descended on the Arts and Industries Building when they were put on display in 1963. The museum was renamed the National Air and Space Museum in 1966, but there was still no funding to build it. Apollo 11 created another surge of interest in space. An exhibition of a Moon rock attracted 200,000 visitors in one month. On May 19, 1970, Senator Barry Goldwater, a retired USAF major general, gave an impassioned speech in the Senate for funding of a museum building.

The job had a clearly defined and tangible goal: to obtain congressional funding, and to build the museum. Collins lobbied hard for the new museum. With the help of Goldwater in particular, Congress relented, and on August 10, 1972, approved $13 million and contract authority of $27 million for its construction. The $40 million budget was lower than he had hoped for, and the building had to be scaled back and some economies made.

In addition to cost pressure, there was also severe time pressure, as the museum was scheduled to open on July 4, 1976, as part of celebrations of the upcoming United States Bicentennial. The design by architect Gyo Obata of the St. Louis firm Hellmuth Obata & Kassabaum aimed to harmonize the new museum with the other ones on the National Mall, so the exteriors were faced with Tennessee marble to match the façade of the National Gallery of Art. Gilbane Building Company was awarded the construction contract. Everything was fast-tracked. Contracts were awarded as soon as each component of the design was complete. This allowed the first contract to be awarded within five months of the start of design. The design was completed in just nine months, and all contracts were awarded within a year of the start of design.

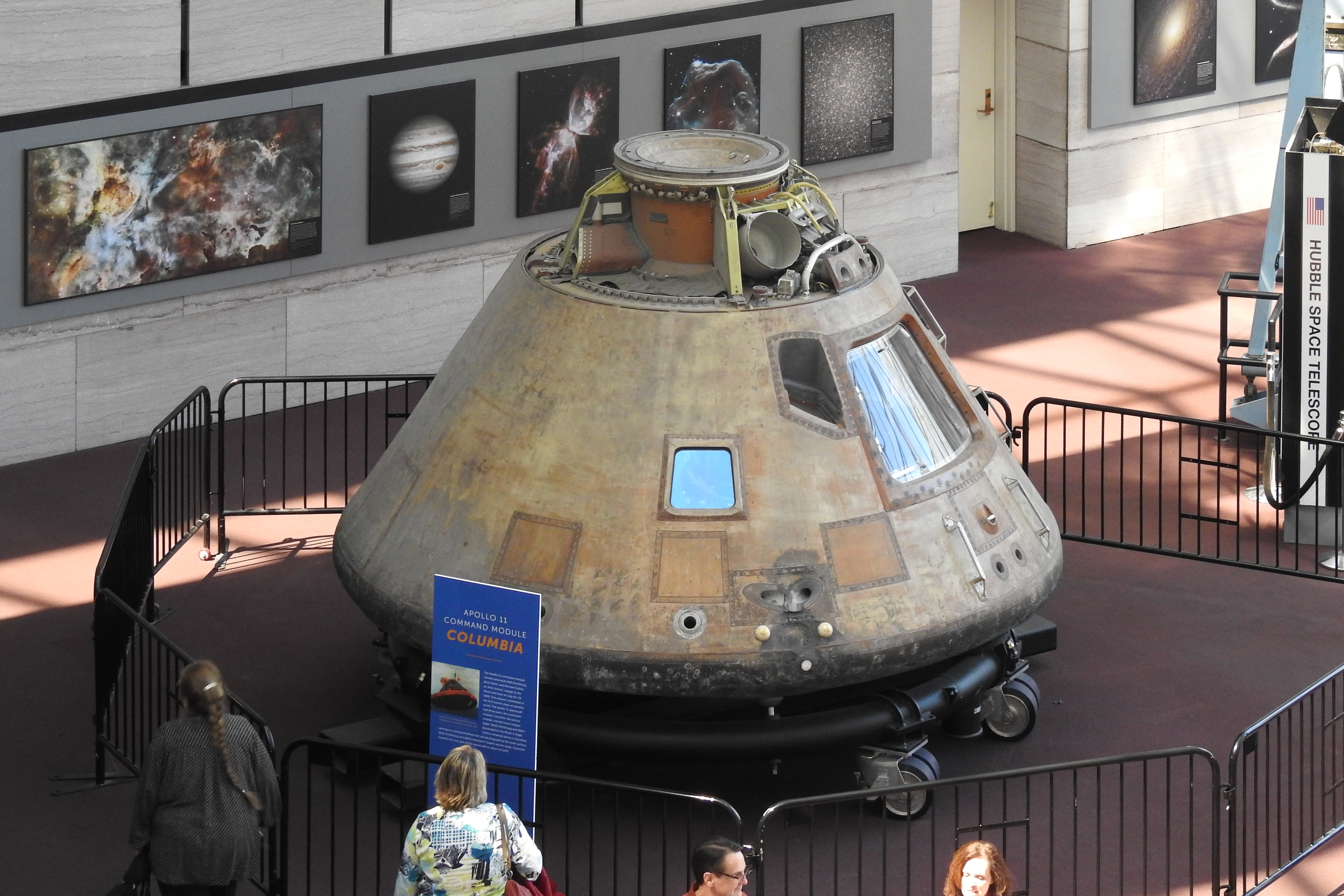
Columbia at the National Air and Space Museum

Ground was broken on the new museum on November 20, 1972. The building was built horizontally rather than vertically, as is the norm, so that work on the interiors could proceed concurrently. Overseeing construction was but a part of Collins' task: he also had to hire museum staff, oversee the creation of exhibits, and launch the museum's Center for Earth and Planetary Studies, a new division devoted to research and analysis of lunar and planetary spacecraft data. Collins described the project as "a monumental effort" in which "individual creativity combined with dedicated teamwork and plain hard work".

The museum was completed on budget, and opened three days ahead of schedule on July 1, 1976. President Gerald Ford presided over the formal opening ceremony. Over one million visitors passed through its doors in the first month, and it quickly established itself as one of the world's most popular museums, averaging between eight and nine million visitors per annum over the next two decades. Visitors entering saw Columbia in the Milestones of Flight Hall, along with the Wright Flyer, the Spirit of St. Louis and Glamorous Glennis.

Collins held the directorship until 1978, when he stepped down to become undersecretary of the Smithsonian Institution. During this time, although no longer an active-duty USAF officer after he joined the State Department in 1970, he remained in the U.S. Air Force Reserve. He attained the rank of major general in 1976, and retired in 1982.

=== Other activities ===
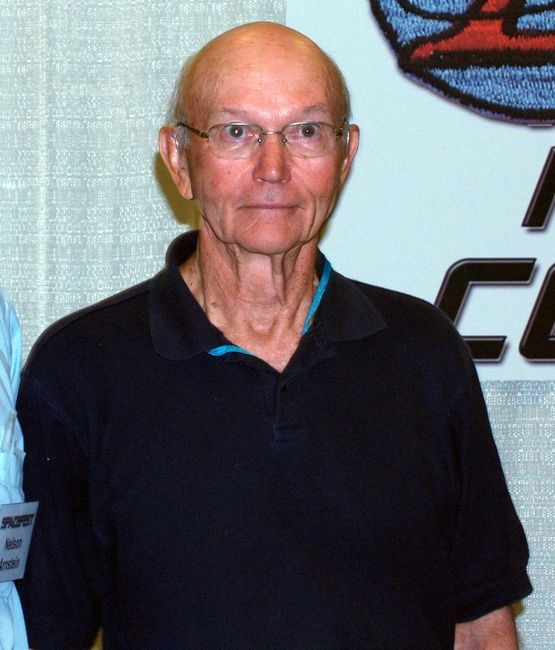
Collins, February 2009

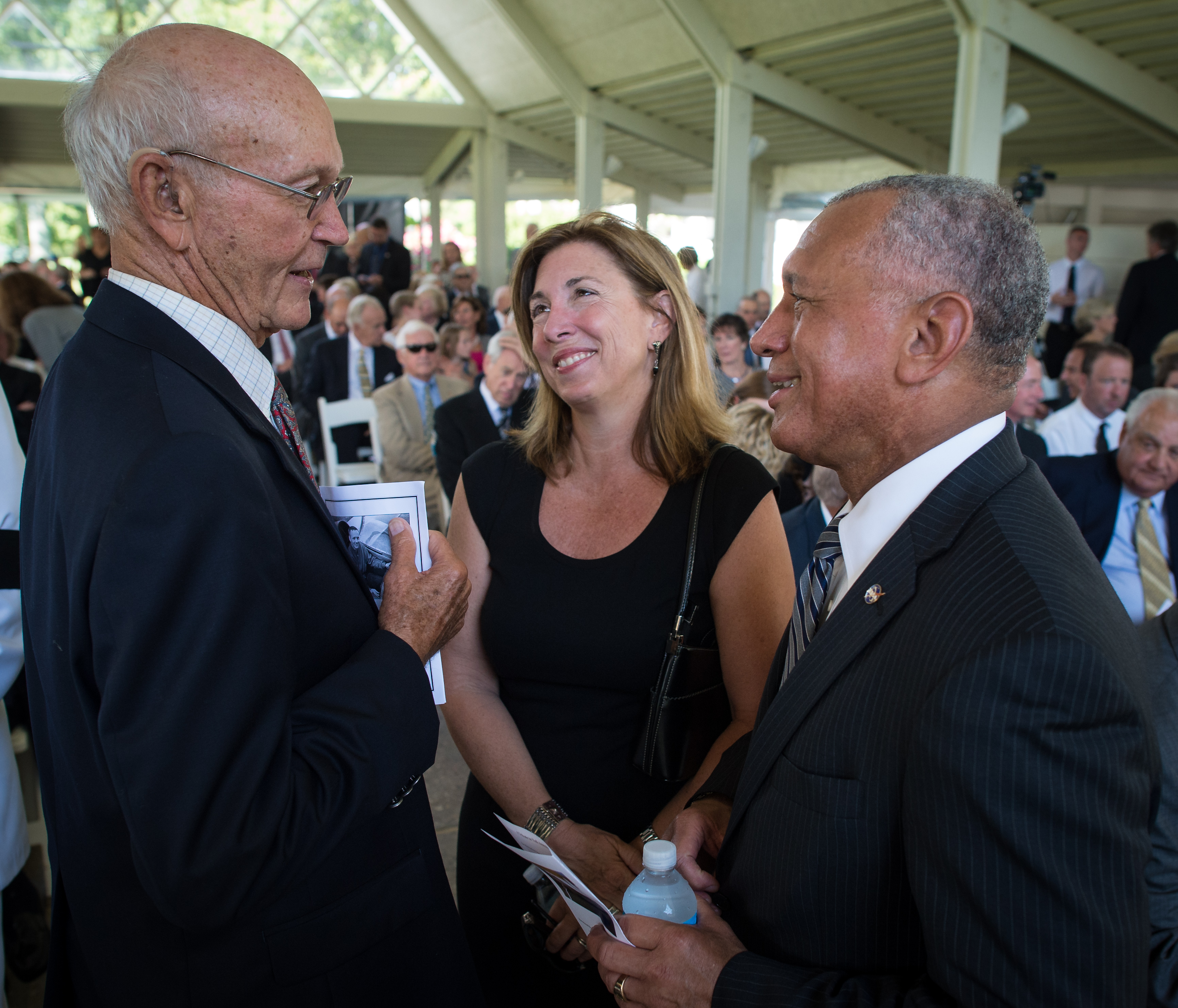
Collins, NASA Deputy Administrator Lori Garver and NASA Administrator Charles Bolden at a memorial service for Neil Armstrong in 2012

Collins completed the Harvard Business School's Advanced Management Program in 1974, and in 1980 became vice president of LTV Aerospace in Arlington County, Virginia. He resigned in 1985 to start his own consulting firm, Michael Collins Associates. He wrote an autobiography in 1974 entitled Carrying the Fire: An Astronaut's Journeys. The New York Times writer John Wilford wrote that it is "generally regarded as the best account of what it is like to be an astronaut."

Collins also wrote Liftoff: The Story of America's Adventure in Space (1988), a history of the American space program, Mission to Mars (1990), a non-fiction book on human spaceflight to Mars, and Flying to the Moon and Other Strange Places (1976), revised and re-released as Flying to the Moon: An Astronaut's Story (1994), a children's book on his experiences. Along with his writing, he painted watercolors, mostly of the Florida Everglades or aircraft he flew; they were rarely space-related. He did not initially sign his paintings to avoid them increasing in price just because they had his autograph on them.

Collins lived with his wife, Pat, in Marco Island, Florida, and Avon, North Carolina, until her death in April 2014.

== Death ==
On April 28, 2021, Collins died of cancer at his home in Naples, Florida, at the age of 90.

Buzz Aldrin, who became the last survivor of Apollo 11, said of Collins, "wherever [Collins has] been or will be, you will always have the Fire to Carry us deftly to new heights and the future."

On January 30, 2023, Collins' ashes were interred in Arlington National Cemetery.

== Honors and awards ==
Collins was a long-time trustee of the National Geographic Society and served as Trustee Emeritus. He was also a fellow of the Society of Experimental Test Pilots and the American Institute of Aeronautics and Astronautics.

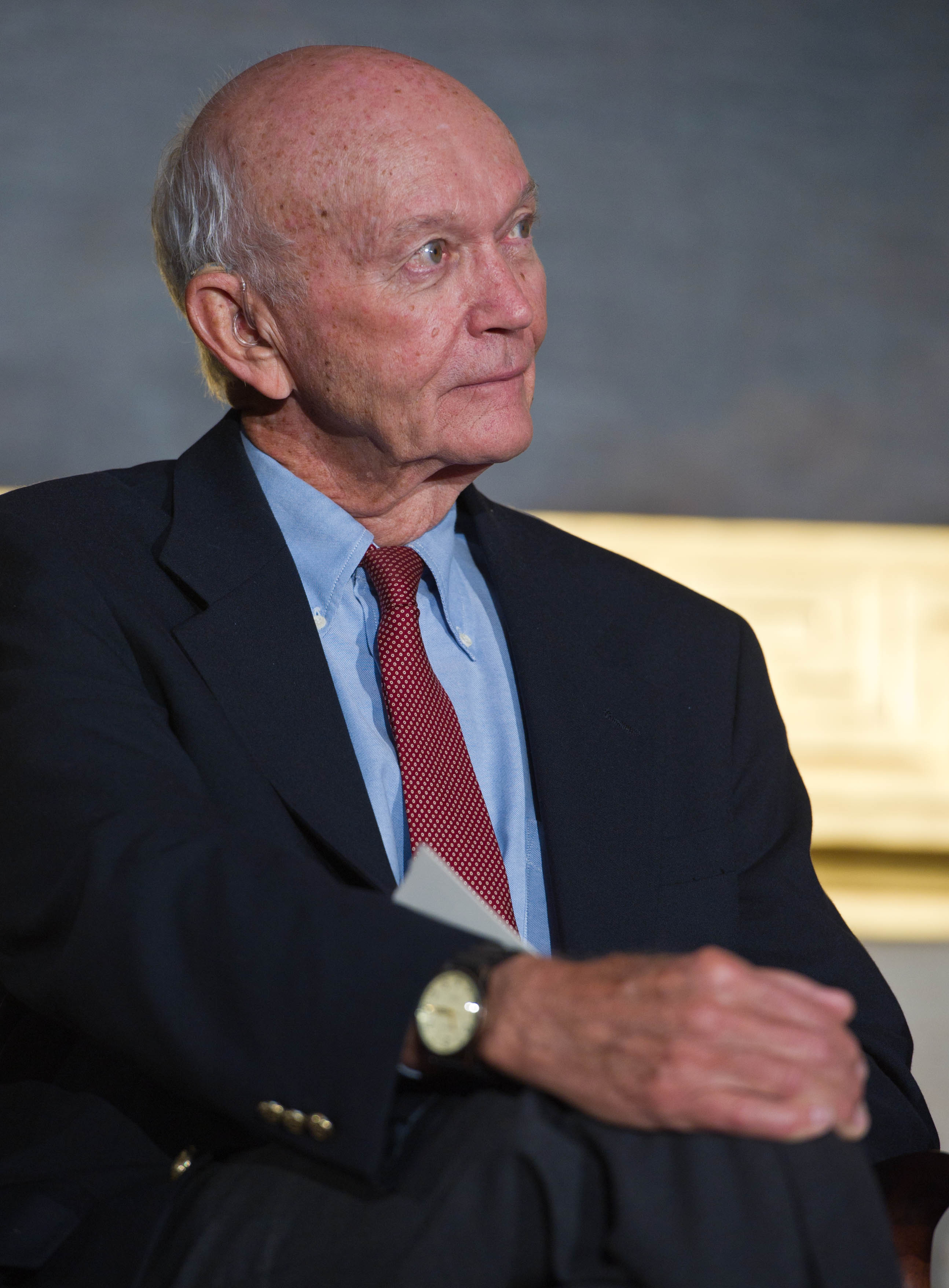
Collins during the Congressional Gold Medal ceremony in the Rotunda at the U.S. Capitol on November 16, 2011

Collins was inducted into four halls of fame: the International Air & Space Hall of Fame (1971), the International Space Hall of Fame (1977), the U.S. Astronaut Hall of Fame (1993), and the National Aviation Hall of Fame (1985). In 2008, he was inducted into the Aerospace Walk of Honor in Lancaster, California. The International Astronomical Union honored him by naming an asteroid after him, 6471 Collins. Also, like the other two Apollo 11 crew members, he has a lunar crater named after him.

Collins was awarded the Air Force Distinguished Flying Cross in 1966 for his work in the Gemini Project. He was also awarded Air Force Command Pilot Astronaut Wings. Deputy NASA Administrator Robert Seamans pinned the NASA Exceptional Service Medal on Collins and Young in 1966 for their role in the Gemini 10 mission. For the Apollo Project, he was awarded the Air Force Distinguished Service Medal, and the NASA Distinguished Service Medal. He was awarded the Legion of Merit in 1977.

Along with the rest of the Apollo 11 crew, he was awarded the Presidential Medal of Freedom with Distinction by President Nixon in 1969 at the state dinner in their honor. The three were awarded the Collier Trophy and the General Thomas D. White USAF Space Trophy in 1969. The National Aeronautic Association president awarded a duplicate trophy to Collins and Aldrin at a ceremony. The trio received the international Harmon Trophy for aviators in 1970, conferred to them by Vice President Spiro Agnew in 1971. Agnew also presented them the Hubbard Medal of the National Geographic Society in 1970. He told them, "You've won a place alongside Christopher Columbus in American history".

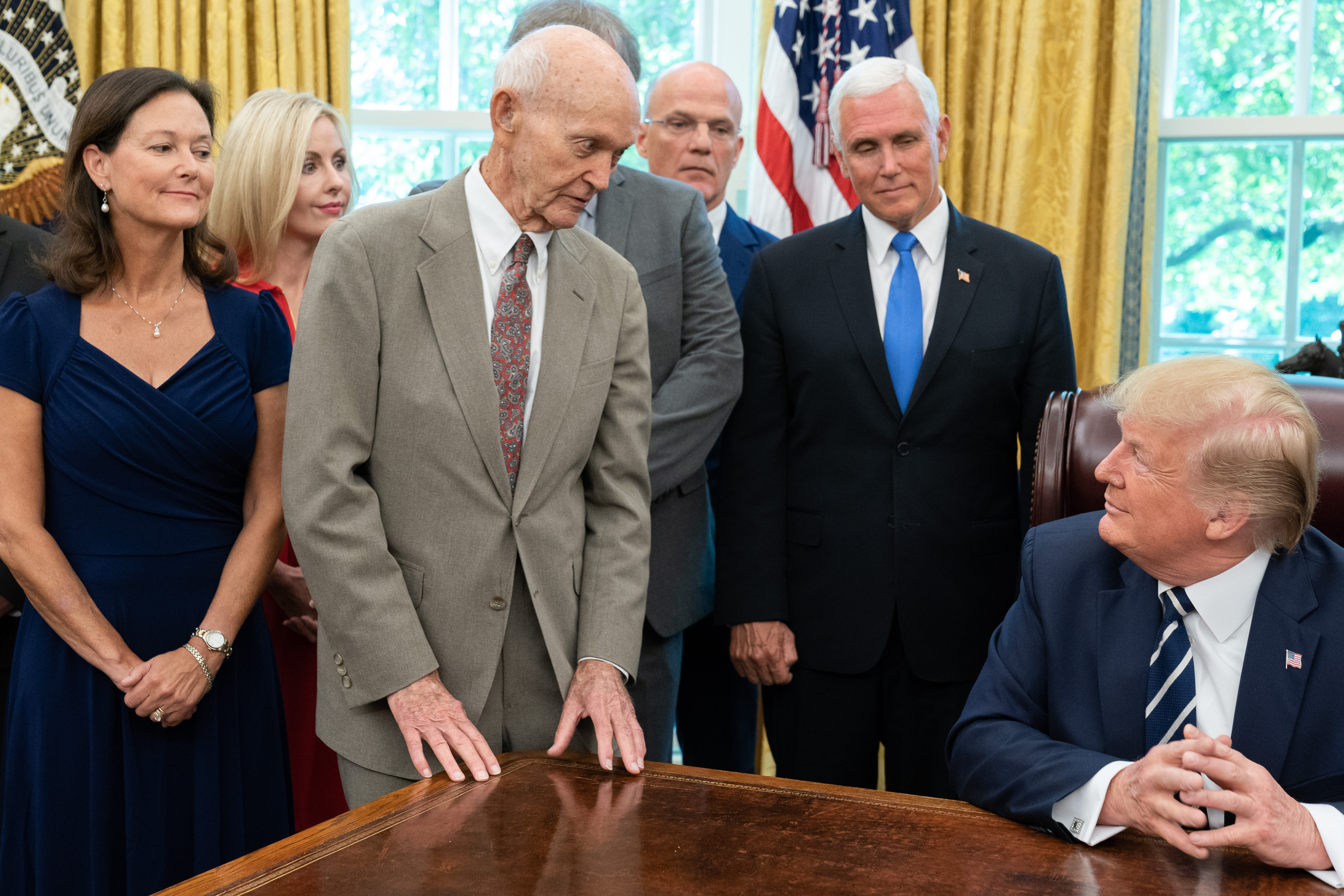
Collins with President Donald Trump, Vice President Mike Pence and NASA Administrator Jim Bridenstine in July 2019

Collins also received the Iven C. Kincheloe Award from the Society of Experimental Test Pilots (SETP) in 1970. In 1989, some of his personal papers were transferred to Virginia Polytechnic Institute and State University. In 1999, while celebrating the 30th anniversary of the lunar landing, Vice President Al Gore, who was also the vice chancellor of the Smithsonian Institution's Board of Regents, presented the Apollo 11 crew with the Smithsonian's Langley Gold Medal for aviation. After the ceremony, the crew went to the White House and presented President Bill Clinton with an encased Moon rock.

The crew was awarded the New Frontier Congressional Gold Medal in the Capitol Rotunda in 2011. It is the highest civilian award that can be received in the United States. During the ceremony, NASA administrator Charles Bolden said, "Those of us who have had the privilege to fly in space followed the trail they forged."

Collins was one of five distinguished judges for the Second Great International Paper Airplane Contest.

== In popular culture ==
Collins is one of the astronauts featured in the 2007 documentary In the Shadow of the Moon. He had a small part as "Old Man" in the 2009 movie Youth in Revolt. In the 1996 TV movie Apollo 11, he was played by Jim Metzler, and in the 1998 HBO miniseries From the Earth to the Moon, he was played by Cary Elwes. In the 2009 TV movie Moon Shot, he was played by Andrew Lincoln. In the 2018 film First Man, he was portrayed by Lukas Haas, and he is featured in the 2019 documentary film Apollo 11. For contributions to the television industry, the Apollo 11 astronauts were honored with round plaques on the Hollywood Walk of Fame. In For All Mankind he is portrayed by Ryan Kennedy. In The Crown he is portrayed by Andrew-Lee Potts. In the 2024 film, Fly Me to the Moon, he is portrayed by Christian Zuber.

British prog rock group Jethro Tull recorded a song "For Michael Collins, Jeffrey and Me", which appears on the Benefit album from 1970. The song compares the feelings of misfitting from vocalist Ian Anderson (and friend Jeffrey Hammond) with the astronaut's own, as he is left behind by the ones who had the privilege of walking on the surface of the Moon. In 2013, indie pop group The Boy Least Likely To released the song "Michael Collins" on the album The Great Perhaps. The song uses Collins' feeling that he was blessed to have the type of solitude of being truly separated from all other human contact in contrast with modern society's lack of perspective. American folk artist John Craigie recorded a song titled "Michael Collins" for his 2017 album No Rain, No Rose. The song embraces his role as an integral part of the Apollo 11 mission with the chorus, "Sometimes you take the fame, sometimes you sit back stage, but if it weren't for me them boys would still be there."

Collins provided narration for the Google Doodle that commemorated the 50th anniversary of Apollo 11's 1969 mission to the Moon.

== Works ==
- Collins, Michael (1974). Carrying the Fire: An Astronaut's Journeys. New York: Farrar, Straus, and Giroux. Bibcode:1974cfaa.book.....C.
- Collins, Michael (1976). Flying to the Moon and Other Strange Places. New York: Farrar, Straus and Giroux. ISBN 978-0-374-32412-4.
- Collins, Michael (1988). Liftoff: The Story of America's Adventure in Space. Illustrated by James Dean. New York: Grove Press. ISBN 978-0-8021-1011-4.
- Collins, Michael (1990). Mission to Mars. New York: Grove Weidenfeld. ISBN 978-0-8021-1160-9.

== See also ==
- Apollo 11 in popular culture
- List of spaceflight records
