= October is the Kindest Month =

Studio album by John Craigie
- Released: August 19, 2011
- Studio: Asher Studios, Martinez, California
- Genre: Folk
- Length: 42:46
- Label: Zabriskie Point
- Producer: John Craigie, Randy Schwartz

John Craigie chronology
Montana Tale (2009)	October is the Kindest Month (2011)	The Apocalypse Is Over (2013)

October is the Kindest Month is the second studio album by the folk-singer John Craigie. It was released in August 2011 on Zabriskie Point Records. Zach Gill and Randy Schwartz returned for this album, along with Steve Adams on bass and Holly McGarry and Shook Twins on backing vocals.

As with Montana Tale, it was placed in rotation on radio stations such as KHUM and KPIG.

== Track listing ==
No.	Title	Length
1	All of July	3:49
2	Breaking Down	2:25
3	Boston in November	3:45
4	Black Swan Lullaby	5:00
5	Washed Off with the Rain	4:19
6	So Many Lives	5:00
7	Chapel Hill	3:33
8	Dog Eyed Girl	4:00
9	Halloween Sunset	3:36
10	Ah Rejoicing	0:49
11	Banjo Renews	6:34

== Personnel ==
- John Craigie – acoustic guitar, ukulele, banjo, harmonica, vocals, producer
- Steve Adams - bass, acoustic bass, string bass
- Randy Schwartz - percussion, vocals, producer
- Zach Gill - piano, organ, accordion
- Shook Twins - vocals
- Holly McGarry - vocals

Production:

- Cian Riordan - engineering, mixing
