= Hill Auditorium =

Performance venue on University of Michigan campus

Coordinates: 42.27896°N 83.73899°W

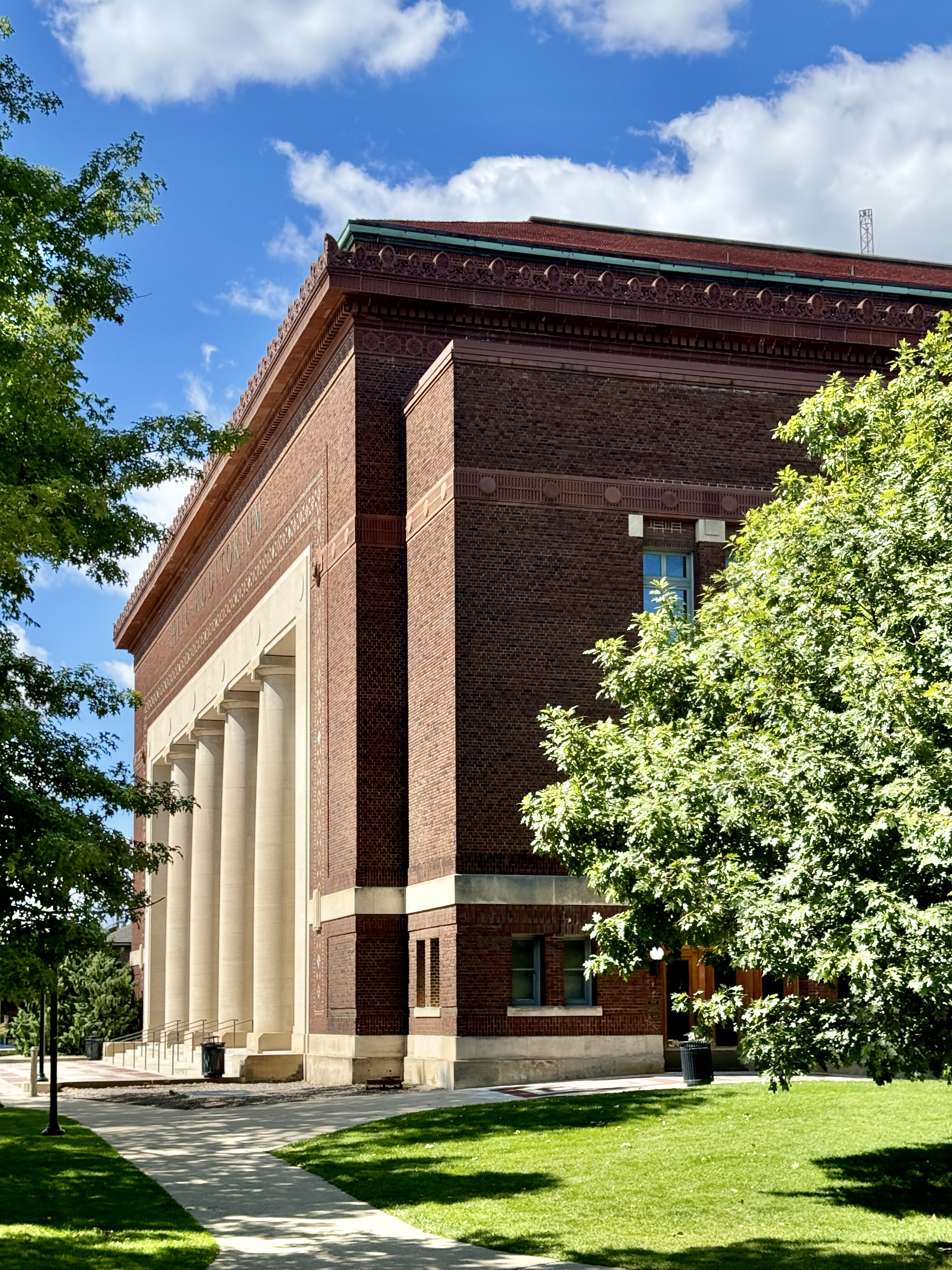
- Hill Auditorium, Ann Arbor
- Interactive map of Hill Auditorium
- Location: Ann Arbor, Michigan
- Owner: University of Michigan
- Operator: School of Music, Theatre, and Dance
- Capacity: 3,500
- Type: Auditorium

Construction
- Opened: 1913
- Renovated: 2002–2004
- Architect: Albert Kahn

Website
- smtd.umich.edu/facilities/hill-auditorium
- Hill Auditorium
- U.S. Historic district – Contributing property
- Part of: University of Michigan Central Campus Historic District (ID78001514)
- Added to NRHP: June 15, 1978

Hill Auditorium is a concert hall in Ann Arbor, Michigan. The auditorium is located on the Central Campus of the University of Michigan, and is managed by the university's School of Music, Theatre, and Dance. Hill Auditorium seats approximately 3,500 guests, and regularly hosts musical performances, lectures, and graduation ceremonies.

The auditorium was named in honor of Arthur Hill (1847–1909), who served as a regent of the university from 1901 to 1909. He bequeathed $200,000 (equivalent to $7.2 million in 2025) to the university for the construction of a venue for lectures, musical performances, and other large productions. Opened in 1913, the auditorium was designed by Albert Kahn and Associates. It was renovated by the same firm beginning in 2002 and was re-opened in 2004.

== Design concept ==
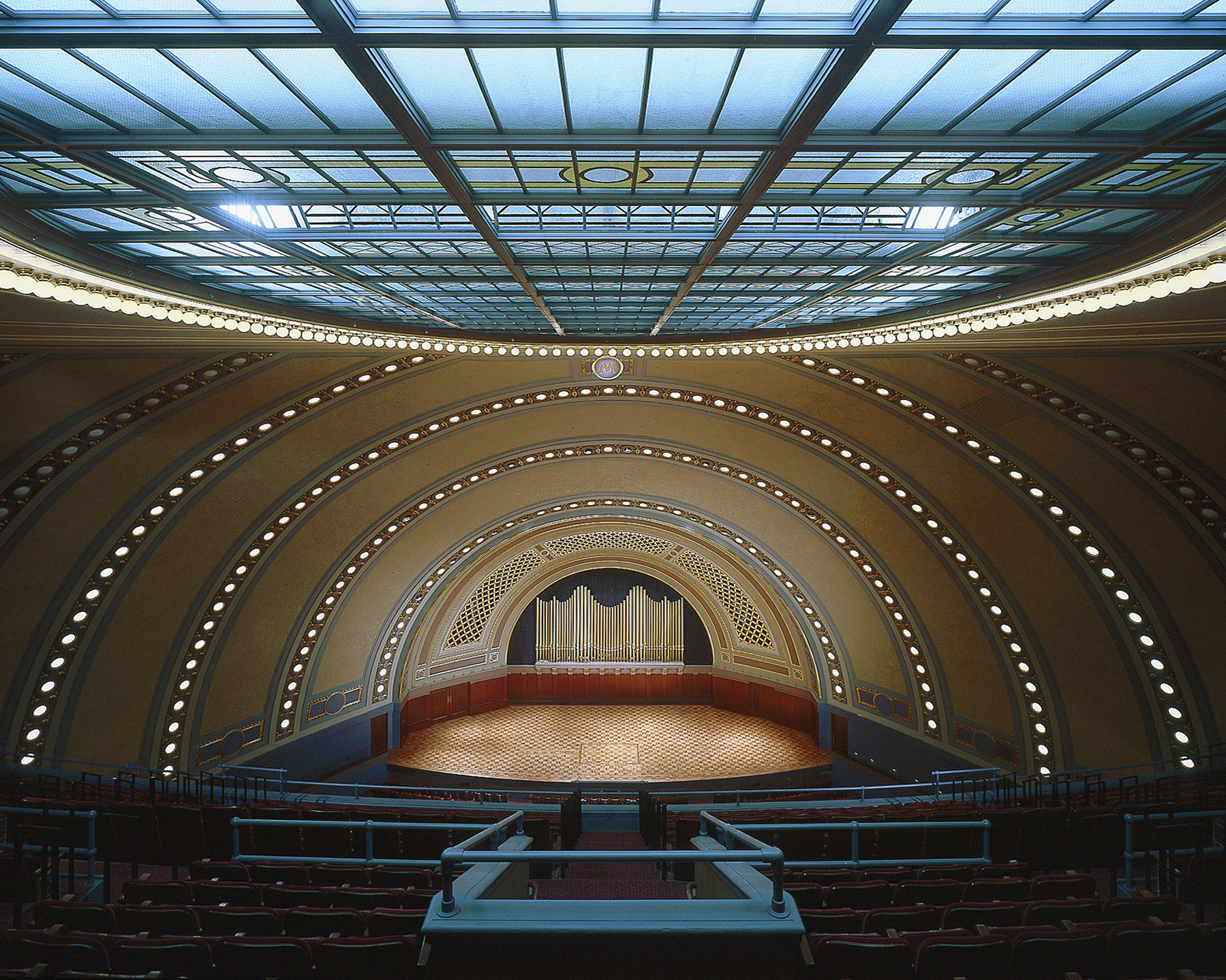
Interior, photographed by Balthazar Korab in 2004

Carol Rose Kahn, the architect's granddaughter, recounted that her grandfather had set out to develop a hall with perfect acoustics. The brief was to design an auditorium that would seat five thousand people, where they could hear from every seat. The only known previous example was the Mormon Tabernacle where it was said that one could hear a pin drop from the stage to the top balcony, although the chamber suffered from excess reverberation.

Albert Kahn wrote to Hugh Tallant, partner of Henry Beaumont Herts, asking if such an auditorium was feasible. Tallant agreed to this and designed the building's acoustics. The result was an auditorium in the shape of a megaphone.

== Renovation ==
The renovation was completed in 2004, costing approximately US$33.5 million (equivalent to US$51.3 million in 2022). The University of Michigan described the renovation with the following:

"When it opened in 1913, Hill Auditorium was hailed as a 'monument to perfect acoustics.' The excellent acoustics, a result of collaboration by architect Albert Kahn with noted acoustical engineer Hugh Tallant, are known world-wide and have made the auditorium a favorite venue for legions of famous musicians and other artists, as well as numerous noted speakers."

"Careful attention will be given throughout the renovation to maintaining the acoustic quality of Hill," said Henry Baier, associate vice president for facilities and operations. In addition, further work will be done to reduce street and lobby noise by building a "sound lock" between the lobby and the auditorium."

== Campus and local users ==
The building routinely hosts performances given by the Ann Arbor Symphony Orchestra and the School of Music's various ensembles, including the University of Michigan Symphony Orchestra, University of Michigan Philharmonia Orchestra, University of Michigan Concert Band, University of Michigan Symphony Band, and University of Michigan Choirs, as well as the mostly non-major ensembles such as the University of Michigan Arts Chorale, the Campus Symphony Orchestra, Campus Bands, the Michigan Marching Band, and the Men's Glee Club and Women's Glee Club.

The building has occasionally hosted musical events for the local Pioneer High School. The most recent event the venue has hosted that has included the school has been the 2022 Choral Cavalcade on March 11, 2022. The Choral Cavalcade is a Choir Concert event that includes the choirs of multiple Middle and High Schools that are in the area. The 2022 event hosted the choirs of the local Tappan and Slauson Middle Schools alongside Pioneer High School.

The auditorium is also host to the University of Michigan Law School graduation each May. In addition, the auditorium serves as the host for two outside schools, the Detroit Catholic Central High School and Father Gabriel Richard Ann Arbor, graduation ceremonies.

== Performances ==
Michigan's University Musical Society presents dance, classical music, popular music, and readings by world-renowned artists at Hill Auditorium. Through the years, Hill's oval-shaped stage has seen performances by Rachmaninoff, the Denishawn Dance Company, the Vienna Philharmonic, the Berlin Philharmonic, the Boston Symphony, the Chicago Symphony Orchestra, London Philharmonic Orchestra, the Leningrad Philharmonic, Jan Kubelik, Jascha Heifetz, Eugène Ysaÿe, Ravi Shankar, Enrico Caruso, Joan Sutherland, Robert Frost, Van Cliburn, Yo-Yo Ma, Helen Hayes, Benny Goodman, Harry Chapin, Wynton Marsalis, Elton John, and the Grateful Dead, among others.

The Folk Festival, a multiple artist Folk-Genre Musical Festival held by a local Jazz/Live Performance Musical bar known as The Ark, has been hosted at Hill Auditorium 18 times since 2005. As of 2022, the last live performance was held here on Friday, January 31 and Saturday February 1, 2020. The Musical Guests for the event were Ingrid Michaelson, The Lone Bellow, Cedric Burnside, Rainbow Girls, Elliott BROOD, with Calexico and Iron & Wine as the final act, playing the song Father Mountain from their 2019 musical collaboration studio album, Years to Burn. Ann Arbor local and Guitarist Willy Porter, the concert's MC, was a musical guest during intermissions while old performers were clearing out and the next act was being set up.

== See also ==
- List of concert halls
