= Scarecrow (John Craigie album) =

Studio album by John Craigie
- Released: May 18, 2018
- Recorded: September 2017
- Studio: Hallowed Halls, Portland, Oregon
- Genre: Singer/songwriter
- Length: 34:00
- Producer: John Craigie

John Craigie chronology
No Rain, No Rose (2017)	Scarecrow (2018)	Opening for Steinbeck (2018)

Scarecrow is the sixth studio album released by John Craigie. The album started out as a vinyl-only release in April 2018, but was eventually released on Spotify, iTunes, and other digital platforms on May 18, 2018. The album was self-produced by John Craigie. Craigie was said to have said that all of the songs on this album were written for his fifth studio album, No Rain, No Rose, but did not make the cut on the album, so the songs ended up on Scarecrow. The album was recorded at Hallowed Halls in September 2017 in Portland, Oregon.

"Scarlet" was the leading single off the album.

== Track listing ==
No.	Title	Length
1	Scarlet	3:42
2	Funeral on Fire	3:21
3	Don't Ask	2:45
4	Badlands Serenade	3:15
5	Quick Quick Slow	3:57
6	Best Chance	4:12
7	Ain't My Job	2:37
8	While I'm Down	3:10
9	Your Ghost	3:32
10	Hiding	4:07

== Personnel ==
Justin Phelps - Hallowed Halls - Mixing and Engineering

Adam Gonsalves - Telegraph Mastering - Mastering

John Craigie - Producer
