= Working On My Farewell =

Studio album by John Craigie
- Released: January 18, 2015
- Recorded: Gadgetbox Studios, Santa Cruz, CA and Fluff & Gravy Studios, Portland, OR
- Genre: Folk, British folk rock, Indie Folk
- Length: 45:22
- Label: Zabriskie Point Records
- Producer: John Craigie

John Craigie chronology
| The Apocalypse Is Over (2013) | Working On My Farewell (2015) | Capricorn in Retrograde...just kidding...Live in Portland (2016) |

Working On My Farewell is the fourth studio album by the folk-singer John Craigie. It was released in January 2015 on Zabriskie Point Records. Recorded in small studios in Santa Cruz, California, and Portland, Oregon, this album is famous for being Craigie's "electric album", with each song being played on electric guitar – a departure from his primarily acoustic style. Although promoted as electric, it is actually one of Craigie's quietest and most melancholic albums, being compared to Bruce Springsteen's Nebraska and Beck's Sea Change'. The title "Working On My Farewell"is taken from the lyrics of the song "Rexroth's Daughter" by Greg Brown

As with the three previous studio albums, Randy Schwartz appears on drums and Cian Riordan is chief engineer.

== Track listing ==
| No. | Title | Length |
|---|---|---|
| 1 | Skipping Like a Stone | 3:49 |
| 2 | Burn That Dress | 4:34 |
| 3 | Vast Dead Forest | 4:31 |
| 4 | Mourning You | 3:34 |
| 5 | Catalina | 4:52 |
| 6 | Cactus | 3:45 |
| 7 | Bisbee | 4:37 |
| 8 | Coldest Colorado | 4:39 |
| 9 | My Darkest Lover | 5:29 |
| 10 | Vondelpark | 5:31 |

== Personnel ==
- John Craigie – electric guitar, vocals, percussion, producer
- Randy Schwartz - drums, percussion, vocals
- Justin Landis- electric guitar, electric bass
- Niko Daoussis - electric guitar, electric bass
- Steve Varney - electric guitar
- Leigh Jones - vocals, percussion
- Kat Fountain - vocals
- Ben Darwish - piano, Wurlitzer, Rhodes, organ
- Jason Montgomery - pedal steel guitar
- Laurie Shook - ghost vocals, banjo
- Anna Tivel - violin
- Jamie Mefford - Rhodes

Production:

- Cian Riordan - engineering
- Jamie Mefford - mixing
