= John Craigie (musician) =

American musician and singer-songwriter

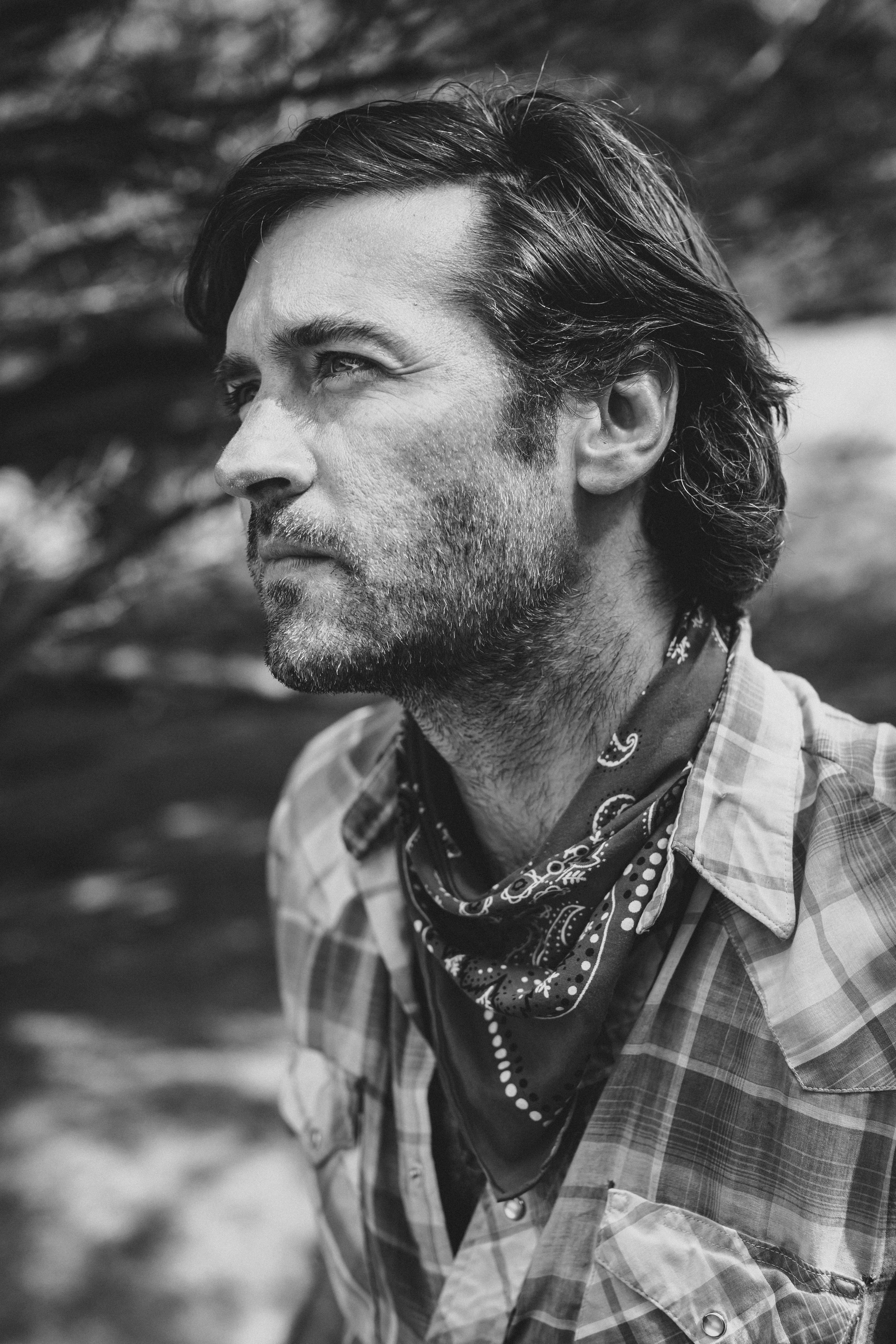
- Craigie in 2021

Background information
- Born: John Harrold Craigie III; June 15, 1980 (age 45)
- Origin: Los Angeles, California, U.S.
- Genres: Folk; Americana; storytelling; comedy
- Instruments: Vocals; guitar; harmonica; banjo; ukulele
- Years active: 2003–present
- Website: johncraigiemusic.com

John Harrold Craigie III (born June 15, 1980) is an American singer-songwriter and storyteller. Hailed as a "Modern-Day Troubadour" in the style of Woody Guthrie, Craigie's comedic storytelling style has been compared to Mitch Hedberg, while his music and commitment to living on the road has drawn comparisons to Guthrie, Ramblin' Jack Elliott and Pete Seeger.

He has performed with or opened for Jack Johnson, Gregory Alan Isakov, Todd Snider, Paul Thorn, James McMurtry, Shawn Colvin, Sean Hayes, Nicki Bluhm, Aoife O'Donovan, ALO, Shook Twins, Rainbow Girls, Avett Brothers, The Infamous Stringdusters and Trampled by Turtles.

== Early life ==
John Craigie was born and raised in Los Angeles, California. He is the grandson of U.S. Air Force general Laurence Craigie. He attended college at UC Santa Cruz in Northern California, where he graduated with a degree in mathematics. In Santa Cruz he began performing live music in local venues and house parties, first as lead singer and guitarist in a psychedelic rock band, "Pond Rock", then solo as a folk singer-songwriter and storyteller. He self-released several albums of songs in this period before his first major studio album, 2009's Montana Tale.

== Music career ==
Craigie is best known for his live performances which blend folk songwriting with comedic storytelling. His 2016 live album, Capricorn In Retrograde… Just Kidding… Live in Portland, wound up on Jack Johnson's car stereo on a drive up the California coast, prompting Johnson to ask Craigie to open for him on 11 dates of his 2017 national Summer tour. Throughout the tour, Johnson brought Craigie on stage during his set to co-perform Craigie's song, "I Wrote Mr. Tambourine Man"; the pair released a single of the song, recorded live at The Greek Theatre in Berkeley, California.

Craigie has released nine studio albums, two live albums, two cover albums, and one live cover album. His album No Rain, No Rose, released in 2017, was recorded in his Portland-home living room, and features Gregory Alan Isakov and Shook Twins. 2020's Asterisk The Universe features Rainbow Girls and was recorded with friends in a Northern California cabin.

== Discography ==
=== Studio albums ===
- Montana Tale ( Zabriskie Point Records, 2009)
- October is the Kindest Month (Zabriskie Point Records, 2011)
- The Apocalypse Is Over (Zabriskie Point Records, 2013)
- Working On My Farewell (Zabriskie Point Records, 2015)
- No Rain, No Rose (Zabriskie Point Records, 2017)
- Scarecrow (Zabriskie Point Records, 2018)
- Asterisk The Universe (Zabriskie Point Records, 2020)
- Mermaid Salt (Zabriskie Point Records, 2022)
- Pagan Church (Zabriskie Point Records, 2024)
- I Swam Here (Zabriskie Point Records, 2026)

=== Live albums ===
- Capricorn in Retrograde...just kidding...Live in Portland (Zabriskie Point Records, 2016)
- Opening for Steinbeck (Zabriskie Point Records, 2017)
- Greatest Hits... Just Kidding... Live - No Hits (Zabriskie Point Records, 2024)

=== Cover albums ===
- Leave the Fire Behind (cover versions of 1990s alternative rock songs, Zabriskie Point Records, 2012)
- Paper Airplane (cover versions of Led Zeppelin songs, Zabriskie Point Records, 2012)
- Abbey Road Lonely (cover of the Beatles' Abbey Road, Zabriskie Point Records, 2022)
- Lonely Revolver (live cover of the Beatles Revolver, Zabriskie Point Records, 2025)
