= No Rain, No Rose =

- Cover by Ben Moon

Studio album by John Craigie
- Released: January 27, 2017
- Genre: Folk, indie folk, Americana
- Length: 51:50
- Label: Zabriskie Point Records
- Producer: John Craigie

John Craigie chronology
Capricorn in Retrograde...just kidding...Live in Portland (2016)	No Rain, No Rose (2017)	Scarecrow (2018)

No Rain, No Rose is the fifth studio album by folk singer-songwriter John Craigie. It was released on January 27, 2017, and recorded in his living room in Portland, Oregon, with the help of other well-known musicians around Portland such as the Shook Twins and Gregory Alan Isakov. This album describes John Craigie's life as a traveling musician and explores the sense of home that he found in Portland after moving from Los Angeles.

The comical banter heard within the tracks demonstrate some of the album's influence from Nitty Gritty Dirt Band's 1972 album Will the Circle be Unbroken. Other influences include The Rolling Stones with the album's folksy cover of "Tumbling Dice".

The title of the album comes from the old Buddhist saying "No mud, no lotus", meaning bad things are necessary in order for good things to happen. John Craigie captures this sentiment throughout the album, and since Portland is the "City of Roses", he symbolizes his hometown as the lotus from the saying, or in other words, one of the 'good things' that has come from hard times.

== Track listing ==
No.	Title	Length
1	Virgin Guitar	3:47
2	Broken	2:55
3	Highway Blood	4:27
4	Rough Johns	3:53
5	Savannah	5:16
6	Bucket List Grandmas	3:48
7	Tumbling Dice	5:14
8	Michael Collins	3:43
9	Live with Less	3:25
10	Light Has Dimmed	4:10
11	I Am California	5:13
12	Interlude	1:00
13	All The Salt	4:59

== Personnel ==
- John Craigie – acoustic guitar, vocals, harmonica, percussion, producer
- Tyler Thompson – drums, percussion, banjo, vocals
- Justin Landis – electric guitar, electric bass, drums on Tumbling Dice
- Brad "Twinkle Toes" Parsons – piano, vocals, percussion
- Kat Fountain – vocals
- Bevin Foley – violin, fiddle, vocals
- Jay Cobb Anderson – electric guitar, vocals, percussion
- Niko Daoussis – mandolin, electric guitar, vocals, percussion
- Shook Twins – vocals
- Gregory Alan Isakov – vocals
- Bart Budwig – vocals, percussion, audio engineer
- John Nuhn – upright bass, vocals, percussion
- Will Koster – dobro

Production

- John Craigie – producer
- Bart Budwig – engineering and mixing
- Adam Gonsalves – mastering
