= 2 (Shook Twins EP) =

EP by Shook Twins
- Released: 2017
- Genre: Singer/songwriter
- Length: 23:00

Shook Twins chronology
What We Do (2014)	2 (2017)

2 is an EP by indie folk group Shook Twins. The first single from the EP, "Mad Scientist," was premiered on No Depression in September 2017. The EP premiered on Pop Dust in November 2017.

== Track listing ==
No.	Title	Length
1	Shake	4:51
2	Safe	3:45
3	Mad Scientist	4:24
4	Toll Free	4:09
5	Shine On	4:07
6	I Don't Know a Thing	2:06

== Personnel ==
- Katelyn Shook – vocals, guitar
- Laurie Shook – vocals, banjo
- Jim Wilson – mastering
- Blue Rooms Studio – mixing
