= Opening for Steinbeck =

Opening for Steinbeck (Live)

Live album by John Craigie
- Released: March 16, 2018
- Genre: Singer/songwriter
- Length: 1:33:00

John Craigie chronology
Scarecrow (2018)	Opening for Steinbeck (Live) (2018)	Asterisk The Universe (2020)

Opening for Steinbeck (Live) is the second live album released by John Craigie. The album was recorded during Craigie's shows at Mississippi Studios and The Doug Fir in Portland, Oregon in December 2017.

The first single off the album, "Presidential Silver Lining" was premiered by Glide Magazine on February 9, 2018. The album was released on March 16, 2018.

== Track listing ==
No	Title	Length
1	Dissect the Bird (Live)	5:18
2	John Gravy/Openers (Live)	3:48
3	Halloween Sunset (Live	3:42
4	Intro to Presidential Silver Lining (Live)	2:29
5	Presidential Silver Lining (Live)	4:57
6	Pants in England (Live)	4:19
7	Resurrection Bay (Live)	4:22
8	Performing at Burning Man (Live)	4:19
9	Let's Talk This Over, When We're Sober (Live)	4:13
10	Learning About Apollo (Live)	3:59
11	Michael Collins (Live)	2:44
12	Degree in Mathematics from UC Santa Cruz (Live)	3:31
13	Westbound Bart (Live)	4:51
14	Intro to Leviticus (Live)	0:49
15	Talkin' Leviticus Blues (Live)	4:40
16	Sad Songs About My Feelings (Live)	3:05
17	Tacoma (Live)	4:26
18	When You're An Otter (Live)	2:14
19	28 (Live)	3:37
20	Water into Wine / Parable of the Buckets (Live)	7:47
21	Jesus Year (live)	4:52
22	Encore Break / Searching for Boogie (Live)	5:55
23	Lucky to Be Alive (Live)	3:26

== Personnel ==
John Craigie - guitar, vocals, harmonica

John Sheski & Juniana Lanning - Mixing and engineering

Adam Gonsalves - Mastering
