= Rainbow Girls =

American singing trio

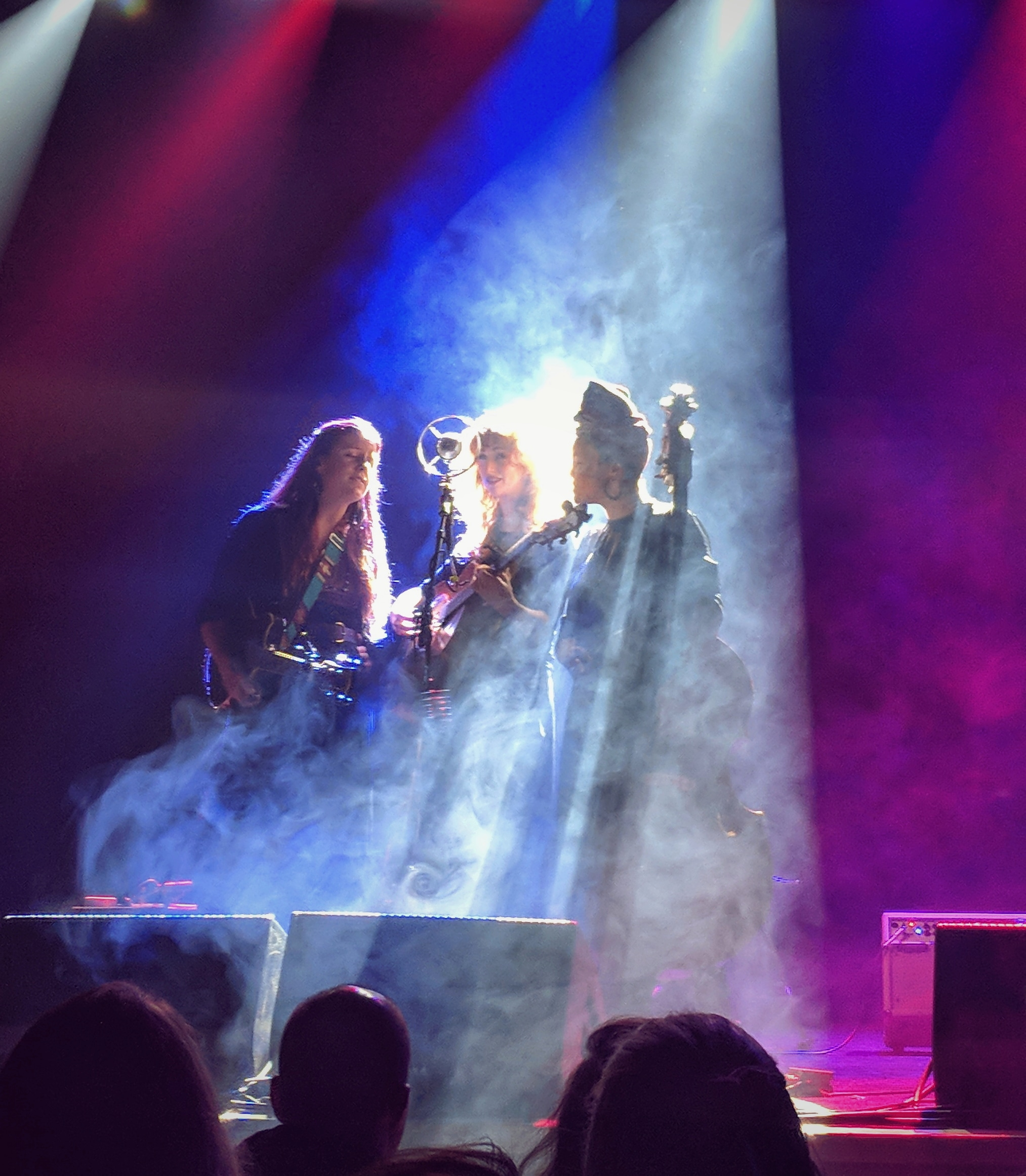
- Rainbow Girls at August Hall, San Francisco, November 10, 2018

Background information
- Origin: Santa Barbara, California, U.S.
- Genres: Indie, folk, Americana, a cappella, Rock and roll
- Years active: 2010–present
- Members: Erin Chapin; Caitlin Gowdey; Vanessa Wilbourn
- Past members: Cheyenne Skye; Savannah Hughes
- Website: rainbowgirlsmusic.com

Rainbow Girls are a three-piece singing group made up of Erin Chapin, Caitlin Gowdey, and Vanessa Wilbourn from the North Bay area of California.

== History ==
Rainbow Girls formed in the fall of 2010, when they began performing together at an underground open mic in UC Santa Barbara’s neighboring college town, Isla Vista. Original members consisted of Erin Chapin, Caitlin Gowdey, Vanessa Wilbourn, and Cheyenne Methmann.

The band spent the Summer of 2011 busking and couch-surfing in Europe, and releasing self-recorded demos. When they returned to California in the Fall, they began playing with drummer Savannah Hughes. The band performed at farmers markets in the Santa Barbara area, playing venues like SoHo and Cold Spring Tavern and performing at local festivals like Earth Day and Summer Solstice.

In April 2013, the band left Santa Barbara and moved to the countryside north of San Francisco’s Bay Area. That same year, Rainbow Girls released their crowdfunded debut album, The Sound of Light. Rainbow Girls continued to tour the West Coast regularly, as well as Europe and the UK every summer.

After the departure of Methmann in 2014, the remaining four members recorded their sophomore album, Perceptronium, and released it in June 2015.

In the spring of 2016, Hughes announced she could no longer tour with the band full-time, so the remaining three members of the band – Chapin, Gowdey, and Wilbourn – began performing as a trio. In this period they opened for John Craigie and The Brothers Comatose.

On November 8, 2017, Rainbow Girls released their third album, American Dream, with a shift to a more acoustic folk sound.

In the fall of 2018, the band received wide exposure when their video of Alvin Robinson's "Down Home Girl" received several million views on Facebook. They soon went into the studio to record a cover album, Give the People What They Want, which was released on February 22, 2019. Their video for “Down Home Girl” (originally performed by Robinson and popularized by The Rolling Stones, The Coasters, and Old Crow Medicine Show) led them to be picked up by Madison House booking agency, as well as by manager, Hannah Spero.

== Discography ==
=== Albums ===
Year	Title
2013	The Sound of Light
2015	Perceptronium
2017	American Dream
2019	Give the People What They Want
2021	Rolling Dumpster Fire
2023	Welcome to Whatever
2024	HAUNTING
