= Montana Tale =

Studio album by John Craigie
- Released: December 11, 2009
- Recorded: GadgetBox Studios, Santa Cruz, CA
- Genre: Folk
- Length: 52:03
- Label: Zabriskie Point Records
- Producer: John Craigie, Randy Schwartz, Leland Jackness

John Craigie chronology
Montana Tale (2009)	October Is the Kindest Month (2010)

Montana Tale is the first "official" studio album by the folk-singer John Craigie. It was released in December 2009 on Zabriskie Point Records. It is his first album since i always -ed you without Trent Boeschen and Kevin Hobson, and marks a turning point in his career. All the albums before this are considered his "early years". Montana Tale was recorded over the summer of 2009 at Gadgetbox Studios in Santa Cruz, California. The guitarist Leland Jackness returned, along with Randy Schwartz on drums and Zach Gill on piano, organ and accordion.

The album is considered a song cycle due to its numerous references to the state of Montana and certain cities within the state. Craigie claimed that many of the songs were written on his early tours through the western United States, when he spent a lot of time traveling through Montana.

The album includes many of Craigie's best-known songs, including "28" which is about the 27 Club and the deaths of Jim Morrison, Janis Joplin and Kurt Cobain.

It was his first album to receive significant airplay and was placed in rotation on radio stations such as KHUM and KPIG.

== Track listing ==
No.	Title	Length
1	Gone	4:14
2	As Tragic	3:41
3	Labor Day	4:07
4	Will Not Fight	6:02
5	Mama Nashville	3:00
6	28	3:52
7	Easter Sunday	4:54
8	Resurrection Bay	4:39
9	Anna Rose (Part IV)	3:35
10	All Through Montana	8:49
11	Map of Dallas	5:13

== Personnel ==
- John Craigie – acoustic guitar, harmonica, vocals, producer
- Leland Jackness - electric guitar, vocals, producer
- Randy Schwartz - percussion, vVocals, producer
- Zach Gill - piano, organ, accordion
- Andy Zenczak - electric bass guitar
- Bobby Hanson - upright bass
- Laura Smith - violin
- Toby Oler - banjo
- Ben Hulan - vocals

Production:

- Cian Riordan - engineering, mixing
- Andy Zenczak - engineering
