= Shook Twins =

American indie-folk music duo

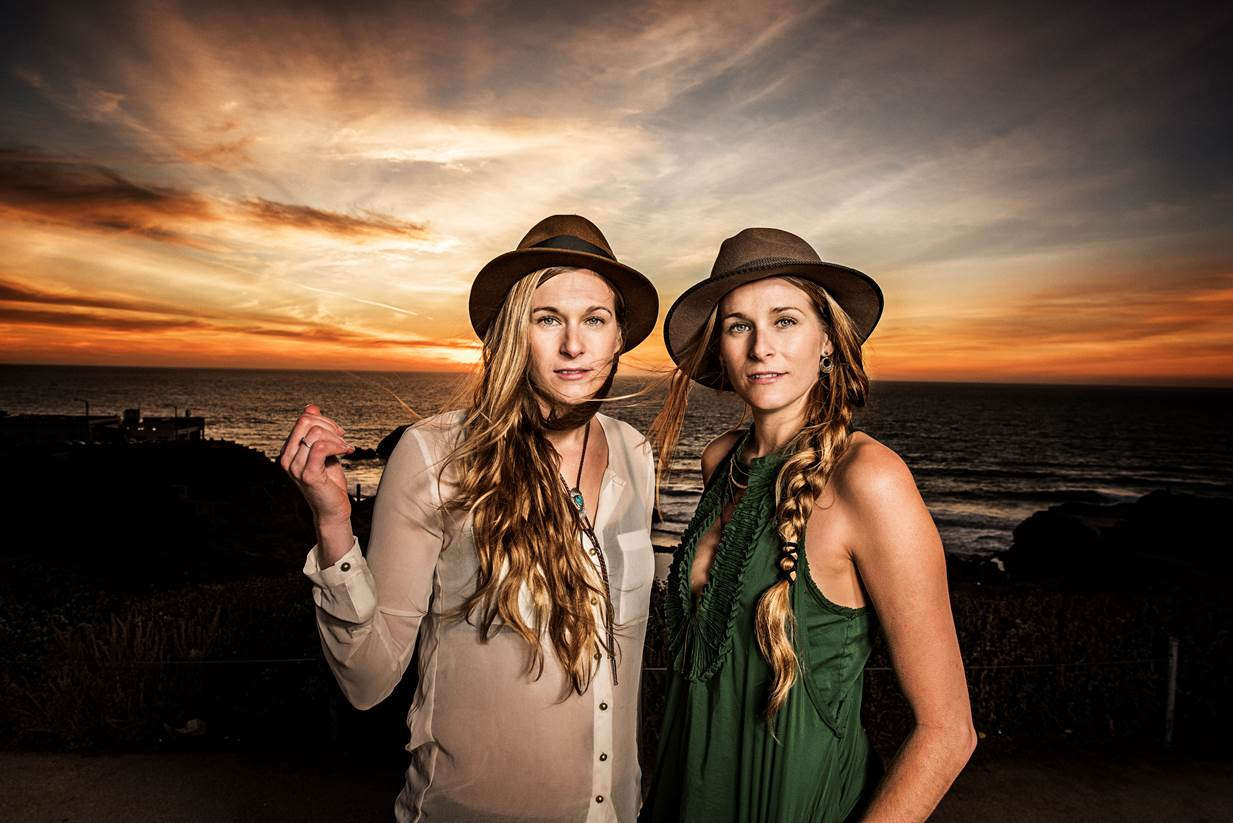

Background information
- Origin: Sandpoint, Idaho
- Genres: Folk, pop, indie rock
- Years active: 2004-present
- Label: Dutch Records
- Members: Katelyn Shook; Laurie Shook; Niko Daoussis; Aber Miller
- Past members: Lane Exworthy; Josh Simon; Barra Brown; Kyle Volkman; Colin Duclos
- Website: www.shooktwins.com

Shook Twins is a folk music group originally from Sandpoint, Idaho and currently based in Portland, Oregon, formed in 2004. The nucleus of the band consists of identical twin sisters Katelyn (guitar, mandolin, banjo, glockenspiel, telephone microphone) and Laurie Shook (banjo, guitar, tambourine, golden egg).

Their style of music is often referred to as "quirky folk", which incorporates acoustic instrumentation including banjo, guitar, upright bass, mandolin, ukulele, glockenspiel, djembe, and their signature golden egg. Twin harmonies layered on top of acoustic instrumentation are coupled with Laurie’s beatboxing and inventive use of a looping machine, and Katelyn’s repurposed telephone microphone. The use of electronics sets their sound apart, creating an eclectic and eccentric blend of folk, roots, pop and fun. A Shook Twins staple is the addition of choruses or lines from other contemporary songs to their own songs, remix-style.

They have toured coast to coast performing at festivals including High Sierra Music Festival, Oregon Country Fair, Hulaween, Northwest String Summit, Summer Camp Music Festival, Electric Forest, Lightning in a Bottle, Joshua Tree Music Festival, Arise Music Festival, Four Corners Folk Festival, Fayetteville Roots and more.

== History ==
Katelyn and Laurie Shook were born in 1984 and grew up in Sandpoint in the Idaho Panhandle. At a very young age, the twins started singing, joining the choir in fifth grade which they continued in high school. They developed their musical repertoire and talent throughout their teen years and subsequently enrolled at the University of Idaho at Moscow in 2002 to pursue radio/TV/digital media majors. In 2004, they both took a year off from college and played their first paid gig at a restaurant. Soon after they secured a regular gig at a winery and established themselves as the "Shook Twins". The sisters played in and around Sandpoint and northern Idaho, releasing their first album You Can Have the Rest in 2008. Advancing their career, the sisters moved to Portland in December 2009, where they worked on their 2011 release Window. Kyle Volkman was an original member of the band joining in 2007 but left for a time and rejoined the sisters in Portland in 2009. Niko Daoussis (vocals, mandolin, guitar) formerly of The Bucky Walters joined the band as a full-time member in 2012 and often performs as his solo act, Cyber Cambel.

On April 6, 2012, an exclusive audio track "Hooks" debuted on MTV Hive. On April 23, 2012, the Shook Twins' song "Rose" was featured in NPR's The Muse Mix: 100 Songs That Cry Her Name. Shook Twins recorded in April/May 2013 with Grammy-nominated producer Ryan Hadlock (The Lumineers, Milo Green) at his Bear Creek Studios in Woodinville, Washington. A new song/video premiere from their forthcoming album debuted on Relix on July 26, 2013. Katelyn and Laurie Shook's side projects include partnering with fellow Portland musician Ben Darwish with the group Morning Ritual on his folk opera "The Clear Blue Pearl." A recent live studio session from Oregon Public Broadcasting was featured on OPB's website. On April 5, 2018, Shook Twins debuted their single "Stay Wild" on Baeble Music.

In 2021, Shook Twins were reported to be appearing on the podcast Storybound.

== Band members ==
- Katelyn Shook (vocals, guitar)
- Laurie Shook (vocals, banjo)
- Niko Daoussis (mandolin, guitar, vocals)
- Aber Miller (keyboard, key bass)

== Discography ==
=== Albums ===
- You Can Have The Rest (Curlypinky Records, 2007)
- Live In The Shop (2009)
- Window (Curlypinky Records, 2011)
- What We Do (Curlypinky Records, 2014)
- Some Good Lives (Dutch Records, 2019)

=== Singles ===
- "Rose" (2011)
- "Holler It Down" (2013)
- "Shake" (2014)
- "Thoughts All In" (2014)
- "Hooks" (2014)
- "Awhile" (2014)
- "Call Me Out" (2016)
- "Mad Scientist" (2017)
- "Safe" (2017)
- "Shake" (2017)
- "Stay Wild" (2018)
- "What Have We Done" (2019)

=== EPs ===
- Live at The Triple Door (2013)
- 2 (2017)
