= Edward Givens =

American astronaut (1930–1967)

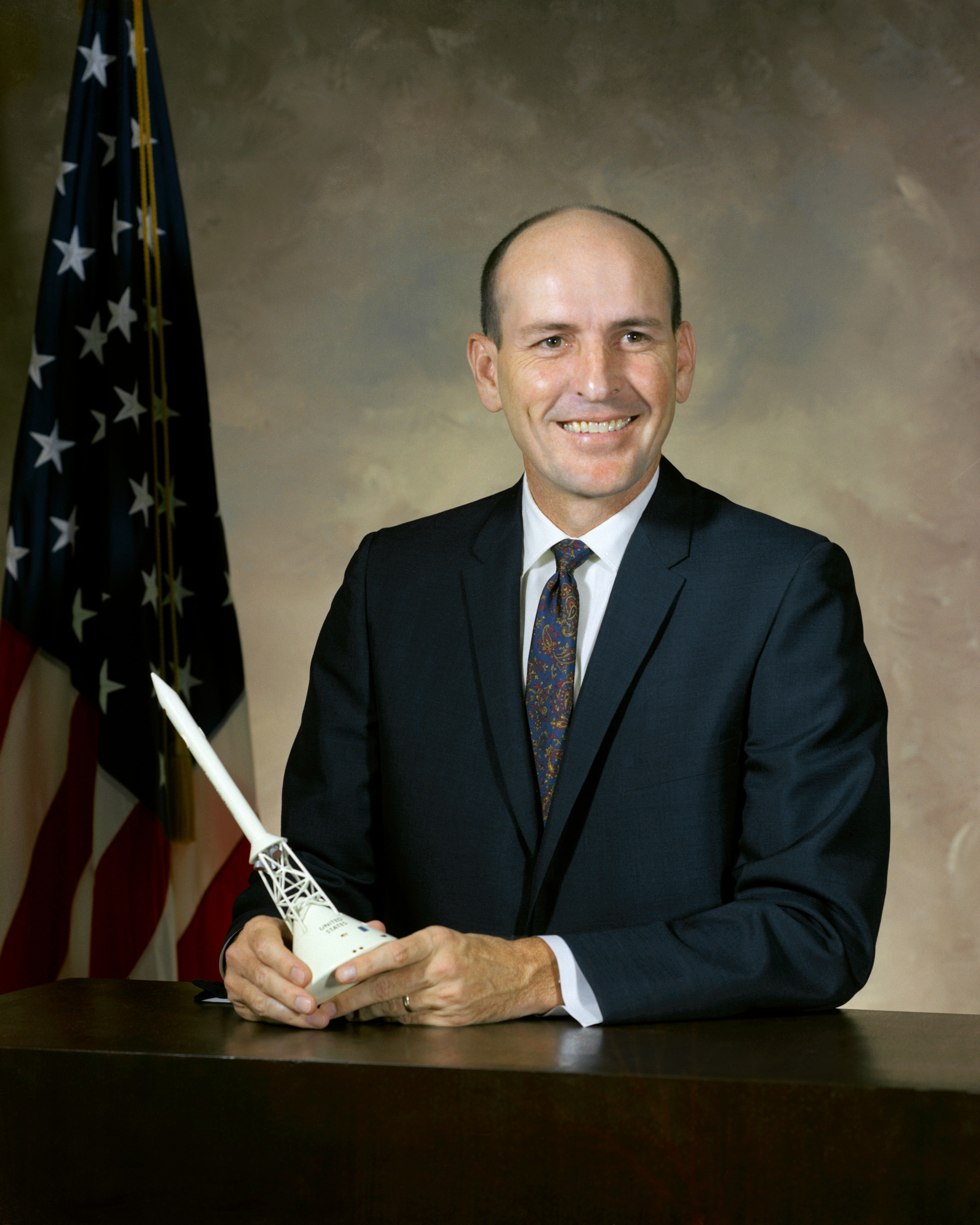
- Born: Edward Galen Givens Jr. January 5, 1930; Quanah, Texas, U.S.
- Died: June 6, 1967 (aged 37); Houston, Texas, U.S.
- Education: Texas A&M University; University of Oklahoma; United States Naval Academy (BS)
- Space career

NASA astronaut
- Rank: Major, USAF
- Selection: NASA Group 5 (1966)

Edward Galen Givens Jr. (January 5, 1930 – June 6, 1967) was a United States Air Force officer, test pilot, and NASA astronaut. Selected by NASA in 1966 as a member of the fifth astronaut group, he died in an automobile accident before being assigned to a prime or backup spaceflight crew.

== Early life and education ==
Givens was born on January 5, 1930, in Quanah, Texas, to Edward Galen Givens Sr. (1904–1990) and Mary Helen Givens (née Jarrell; 1909–2002). He had one younger brother, Donald Jarrell Givens (1932–1952), who died in a Consolidated P4Y-2 Privateer crash in Corpus Christi, Texas.

As a child, his family called him Young Galen Givens. He took on extra courses when he was in high school, which allowed him to finish a year early. He worked in a grocery store and spent time cleaning cars to earn money for flying lessons and would hitchhike to Childress Municipal Airport to take them. His parents said he "never had an interest in anything but aviation". Givens earned his pilot's license in early 1946, and then performed a solo flight the day after he turned 16 in a Piper Cub. He graduated from Quanah High School in 1946. Givens was active in the Boy Scouts of America where he achieved its second highest rank, Life Scout.

He attended Texas A&M University for a semester and the University of Oklahoma for three semesters. He graduated in 1952, as an outstanding student, with a Bachelor of Science degree in Naval Sciences from the United States Naval Academy. During his time at the academy, Givens (or "Give", as he was known there), studied academics, undertook flight training, and played varsity lacrosse.

Givens and his wife Ada had three children: Catherine H. (born in 1963), Edward G. (born in 1964), and Diane (born in 1967). Son Edward III graduated from the U.S. Air Force Academy in 1986, becoming a fighter pilot in the F-15.

== Military career ==
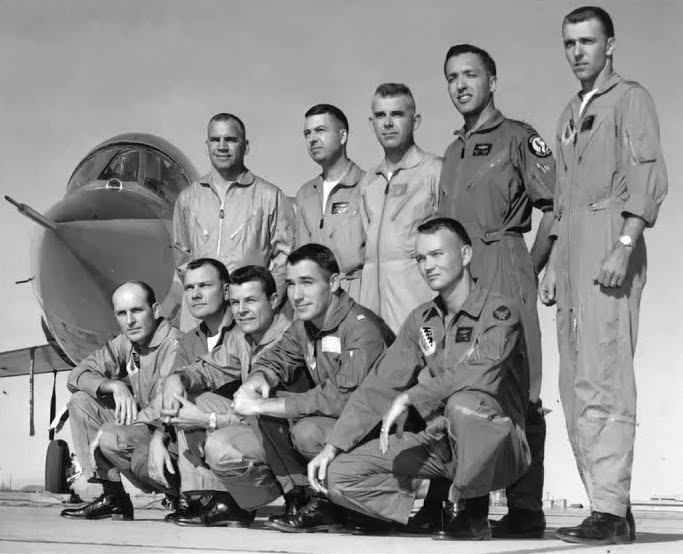
ARPS Class III graduates Front row: Givens, Tommie Benefield, Charlie Bassett, Greg Neubeck and Mike Collins. Back row: Al Atwell, Neil Garland, Jim Roman, Al Uhalt and Joe Engle.

Givens was commissioned in the Air Force as a second lieutenant upon graduating from Annapolis in 1952, and received his flight training as a student pilot at the United States Air Force Air Training Command. On August 18, he flew the T-6 Texan—the first advanced trainer he flew with the air force—and continued to fly the plane almost every day. Givens was awarded his wings on February 4, 1953, as one of the top students. As such, he could choose the branch of the air force where he wanted to serve and chose fighter training at Williams Air Force Base in Chandler, Arizona. The group commander was known to be tough on his students, and Givens chose this location so he could be formed into a great fighter pilot.

He started flying the T-28 Trojan at his new assignment, and learned fighter tactics, formation flying, and some aerobatics. Starting on June 3, he flew the two-seater T-33. On October 2, he moved from Chandler to Perrin Air Force Base, in Sherman, Texas, where he continued flying the T-33. In addition to training with the T-33, he began flying the F-86D, an all-weather, single-seat fighter jet with an all-rocket armament, and achieved supersonic speed for the first time while flying it. In 1954, he was promoted to first lieutenant, and was assigned duty in Japan as a flight commander and fighter pilot with the 35th Fighter-Interceptor Group until 1956.

He served as an instructor at the Air Force Interceptor Weapons School from January 1956 to March 1958 and then attended the USAF Experimental Flight Test Pilot School at Edwards Air Force Base, California as a captain. Graduating as an outstanding graduate (Class 58B), he became an instructor in the Stability and Control Section.

His next assignment took him to the Naval Air Station Point Mugu, California, where he was a project pilot with Air Development Squadron 4. While there, he not only conducted operational evaluations, but was responsible for compiling and developing the operation procedures and tactics for fleet operation of the F8U-2N—a single-engine, supersonic, carrier-based jet aircraft.

He served as Assistant to the Commandant at the USAF Experimental Flight Test Pilot School from November 1961 to September 1962 and then attended the Aerospace Research Pilot School (Class III), from which he graduated in 1963. When informed of his selection for astronaut training in 1966, he was assigned as Project Officer with USAF SSD Detachment 2 at the Manned Spacecraft Center in Houston, Texas.

He logged more than 3,500 hours flight time; 2,800 hours in jet aircraft.

== NASA career ==
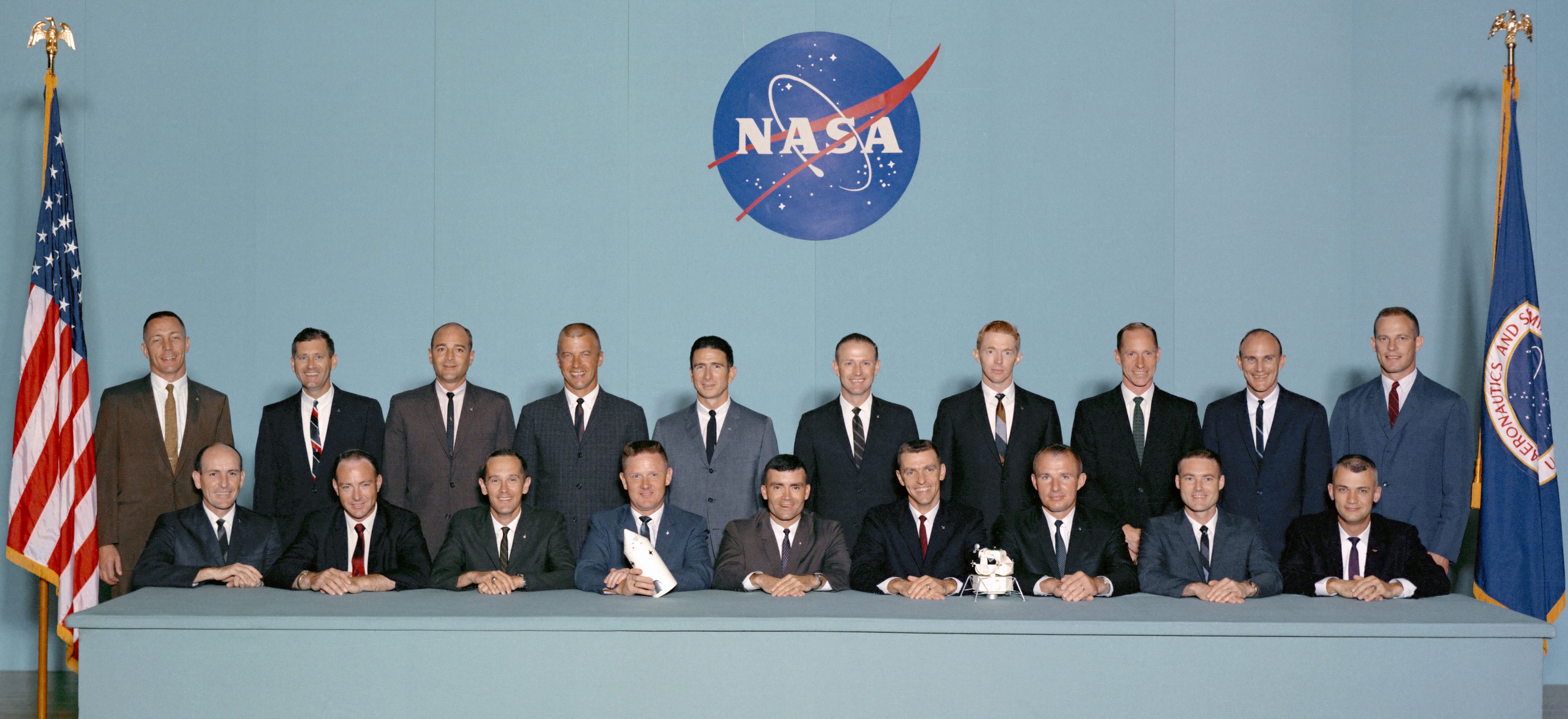
Givens (sitting row, 1st from left), with fellow Original 19 astronauts

Givens was a Project Mercury finalist in 1959, and was one of nineteen astronauts selected by NASA in April 1966 for its fifth astronaut group. After completing basic astronaut training, he was assigned to the Apollo program, and briefly served on the support crew for the first crewed mission, Apollo 1, and then, after the fire, of Apollo 7.

== Death ==
On June 6, 1967, Givens was driving his Volkswagen home from a meeting of the Quiet Birdmen fraternal organization, with two other officers, when he missed a sharp, unmarked turn and crashed into a ditch in Pearland, Texas, near the Manned Spacecraft Center. Givens died on the way to the hospital. The two other passengers were injured. At the time of his death, Givens held the rank of major. He was buried at Quanah Memorial Park in his hometown. He was survived by his wife Ada and their three children.

I'm not a hero. I've just got a job to do, and I try to do it to the best of my ability. This is the pinnacle of my career—it's probably the most interesting and challenging job that I can conceive of. I wouldn't trade it for anything.

— Givens, when asked if he saw himself as a modern-day hero.

== See also ==
- Fallen Astronaut

== Bibliography ==
- Burgess, Colin; Doolan, Kate (October 1, 2003). Fallen Astronauts: Heroes Who Died Reaching for the Moon. Bibson Books. ISBN 978-0803262126.
- Burgess, Colin (2011). Selecting the Mercury Seven: The Search for America's First Astronauts. Springer-Praxis books in space exploration. New York; London: Springer. ISBN 978-1-4419-8405-0. OCLC 747105631.
