= Francis G. Neubeck =

American test pilot and astronaut

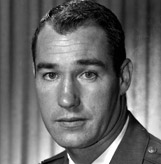
- Born: April 11, 1932 (age 94); Washington, D.C., U.S.
- Education: USNA, B.S. 1955; AU, MBA 1972
- Occupation: Test pilot
- Space career

USAF astronaut
- Status: Retired
- Rank: Colonel, USAF
- Selection: 1965 USAF MOL Group 1
- Missions: None

Francis Gregory "Greg" Neubeck (born April 11, 1932) is a retired Colonel in the United States Air Force and a former USAF astronaut. Although he trained for the USAF Manned Orbital Laboratory (MOL), the program was cancelled before any of the MOL crews reached space.

Neubeck was born April 11, 1932, in Washington, D.C., and graduated with a Bachelor of Science degree in 1955 from the United States Naval Academy. Although a USNA graduate, he chose to begin his career in the United States Air Force. In 1972, he earned a Master of Business Administration degree from Auburn University in Alabama.

Greg always got a lot done on his own. He was the quietest of all of us and maybe the most independent, and that worked for him because he really knew his stuff.

— Lachlan Macleay, describing his MOL colleague.

At the start of his USAF career, Neubeck worked on the development of weapons systems and as a flight instructor. He was one of the 32 finalists for NASA Astronaut Group 2 in 1962, but ultimately was not selected. He graduated from the U.S. Air Force Test Pilot School in Class 60C, Aerospace Research Pilot School (ARPS) Class III, and MOL. In 1965, he was selected as one of the first astronauts to the Air Force's classified Manned Orbital Laboratory. The goal of the MOL program, canceled in 1969 before sending any astronauts into space, was to man a space station with military astronauts using a modified Gemini spacecraft. The history of the MOL program was presented in the public television series NOVA episode called "Astrospies" which aired February 12, 2008.

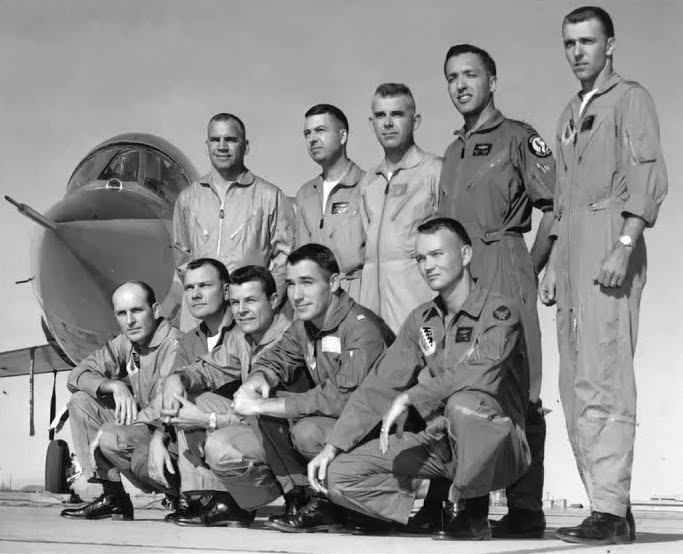
ARPS Class III graduates Front row: Edward Givens, Tommie Benefield, Charlie Bassett, Neubeck and Mike Collins. Back row: Al Atwell, Neil Garland, Jim Roman, Al Uhalt and Joe Engle.

After the MOL program cancellation, Neubeck continued his USAF career including a combat tour in south-east Asia. He also served as vice commander at the Tactical Air Warfare Center at Eglin Air Force Base in Florida before retiring from the Air Force in 1986. Neubeck worked in the aerospace industry, became an author, and ran for public office. In 1986, he became the Republican nominee for the U.S. House of Representatives from Florida's first congressional district but was not elected. As of 2007, Neubeck resides in Florida.
