= NASA Astronaut Group 2 =

1962 human spaceflight selection of nine candidates

Next Nine
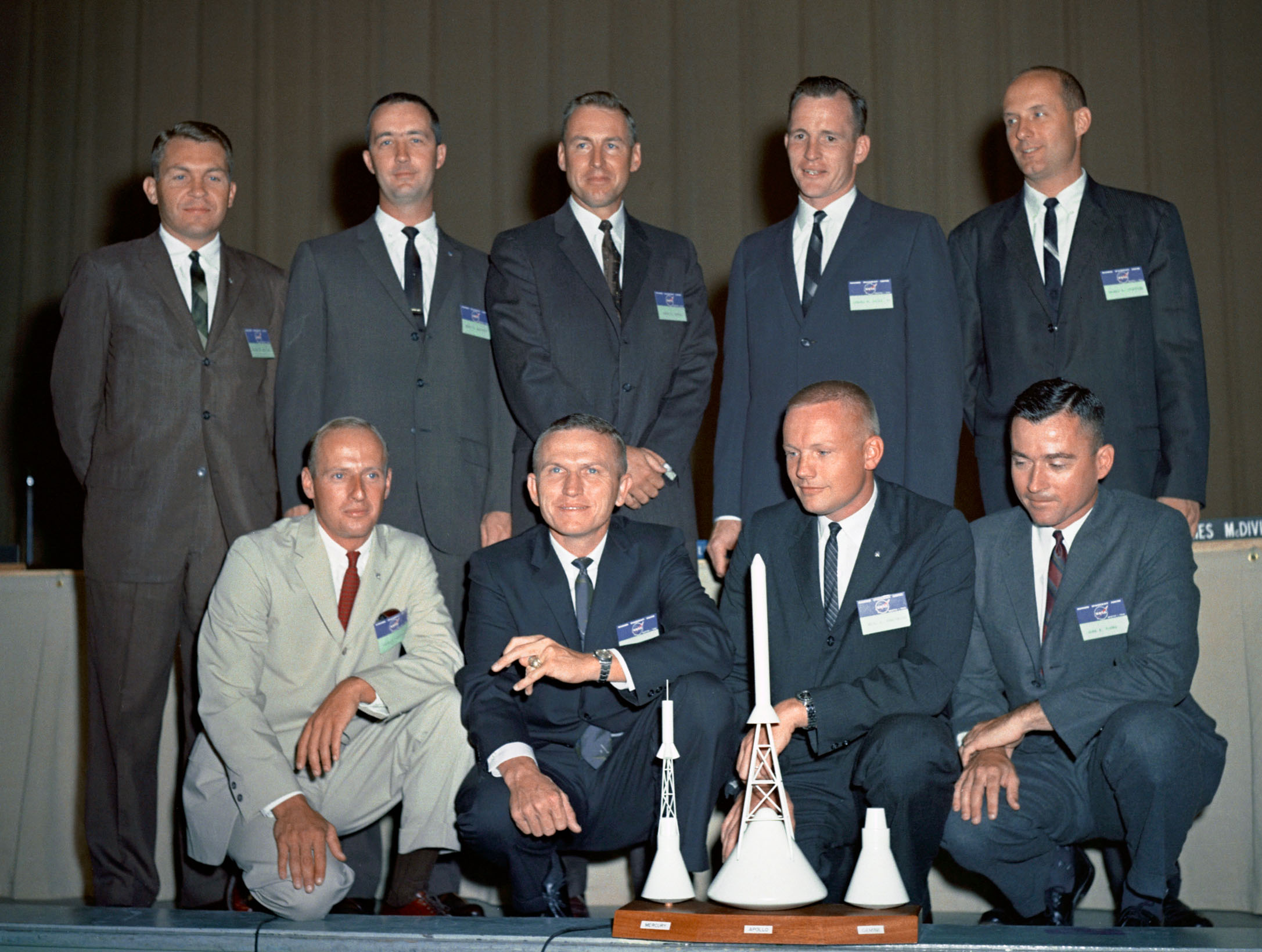
- Group 2 astronauts. Back row, left to right: Elliot See, James McDivitt, Jim Lovell, Ed White, Thomas Stafford. Front row: Pete Conrad, Frank Borman, Neil Armstrong, John Young. Before them are models of the Mercury, Apollo, and Gemini spacecraft.
- Year selected: 1962
- Number selected: 9

NASA Astronaut Group 2 (nicknamed the "Next Nine" and the "New Nine") was the second group of astronauts selected by the National Aeronautics and Space Administration (NASA). Their selection was announced on September 17, 1962. The group augmented the Mercury Seven. President John F. Kennedy had announced Project Apollo, on May 25, 1961, with the ambitious goal of putting a man on the Moon by the end of the decade, and more astronauts were required to fly the two-man Gemini spacecraft and three-man Apollo spacecraft then under development. The Mercury Seven had been selected to accomplish the simpler task of orbital flight, but the new challenges of space rendezvous and lunar landing led to the selection of candidates with advanced engineering degrees (for four of the nine) as well as test pilot experience.

The nine astronauts were Neil Armstrong, Frank Borman, Pete Conrad, Jim Lovell, James McDivitt, Elliot See, Tom Stafford, Ed White, and John Young. The Next Nine were the first astronaut group to include civilian test pilots: See had flown for General Electric, and Armstrong had flown the X-15 rocket-powered aircraft for NASA. Six of the nine flew to the Moon (Lovell and Young twice), and Armstrong, Conrad, and Young walked on it as well. Seven of the nine were awarded the Congressional Space Medal of Honor. Lovell was the last surviving member of the group and died on August 7, 2025, at the age of 97.

== Background ==
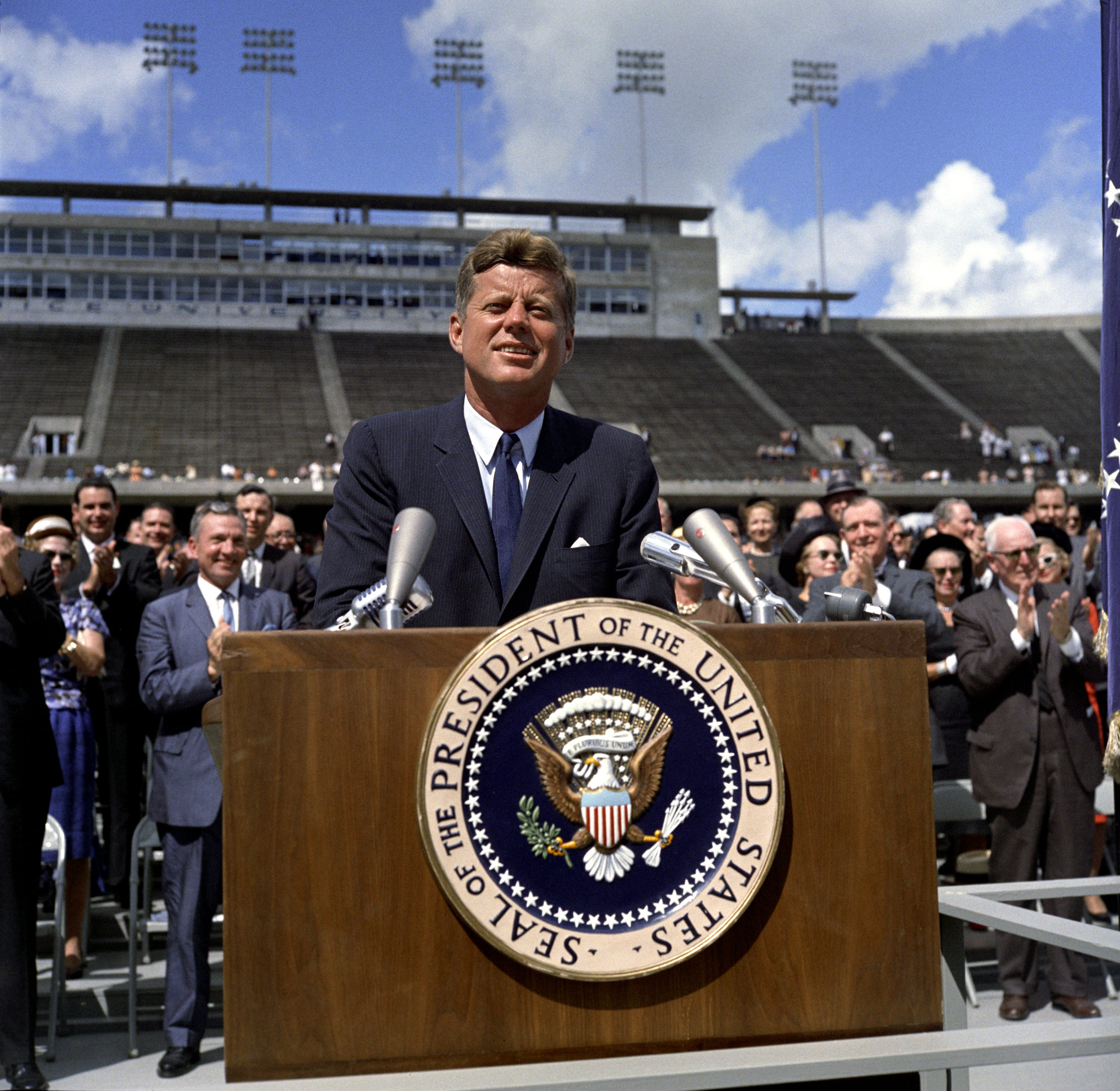
"We choose to go to the Moon": President John F. Kennedy speaks on the nation's space effort at Rice University in Houston, on September 12, 1962

The launch of the Sputnik 1 satellite by the Soviet Union on October 4, 1957, started a Cold War technological and ideological competition with the United States known as the Space Race. The demonstration of American technological inferiority came as a profound shock to the American public. In response to the Sputnik crisis, a new civilian agency, the National Aeronautics and Space Administration (NASA), was created to oversee an American space program. The Space Task Group (STG) at the NASA Langley Research Center in Hampton, Virginia, created an American crewed spaceflight project called Project Mercury. The selection of the first astronauts, known as the "Original Seven" or "Mercury Seven", was announced on April 9, 1959.

By 1961, although it was yet to launch a person into space, the STG was confident that Project Mercury had overcome its initial setbacks, and that the United States had overtaken the Soviet Union as the most advanced nation in space technology. The STG began considering Mercury Mark II, a two-person successor to the Mercury spacecraft. This confidence was shattered on April 12, 1961, when the Soviet Union launched Vostok 1, and cosmonaut Yuri Gagarin became the first person to orbit the Earth. In response, President John F. Kennedy announced a far more ambitious goal on May 25, 1961: to put a man on the Moon by the end of the decade. The effort to land a man on the Moon already had a name: Project Apollo. The two-person Mercury II spacecraft concept was formally announced by the STG head, Robert R. Gilruth, on December 7, 1961, and on January 3, 1962, it was officially named Project Gemini.

On April 18, 1962, NASA formally announced that it was accepting applications for a new group of astronauts who would assist the Mercury astronauts with Project Mercury, and join them in flying Project Gemini missions. It was anticipated that they might go on to command Project Apollo missions. Unlike the selection process for the Mercury Seven, which was carried out in secret, this selection was widely advertised; public announcements and the minimum standards were communicated to aircraft companies, government agencies and the Society of Experimental Test Pilots.

== Selection criteria ==
Right now, in the beginning, we are picking experienced test pilots, not because they are fighter pilots, but because they have experience in dealing with new machines, unusual situations, being scared to death yet reacting properly. We're not saying for a minute that no one except test pilots has this experience. But this group also has the engineering background that we're looking for to get our programs started.

— Gus Grissom, February 1963

The five minimum selection criteria were that an applicant:

- was an experienced test pilot, with 1,500 hours test pilot flying time, who had graduated from a military test pilot school, or had test pilot experience with NASA or the aircraft industry;
- had flown high-performance jet aircraft;
- had earned a degree in engineering or the physical or biological sciences;
- was a U.S. citizen, under 35 years of age, and 6 feet 0 inches (1.83 m) or less in height; and
- was recommended by his employer.

The criteria differed from those of the Mercury Seven selection in several ways. The Gemini spacecraft was expected to be roomier than the Mercury one, so the height requirement was relaxed slightly. This made Thomas P. Stafford eligible. A college degree was now required, but could be in the biological sciences. Civilian test pilots were now eligible, but the requirement for experience in high-performance jets favored those with recent experience, and fighter pilots over those with multi-engine experience such as Scott Carpenter of the Mercury Seven. The age limit was lowered from 40 to 35 because whereas Mercury was a short-term project, Project Apollo was going to run until the end of the decade at least. The changed selection criteria meant that the selection panel could not simply select another group from the Mercury Seven finalists.

At this time, Jerrie Cobb, a female award-winning pilot, was pressing for women to be allowed to become astronauts. In 1961 she was one of thirteen women known as the Mercury 13 who had passed the same medical evaluation tests given to the Mercury Seven astronauts as part of a USAF project that assessed the capability of women for spaceflight. Although women were not prevented from applying to become NASA astronauts in 1962, the requirement for jet test pilot experience effectively excluded them. NASA Administrator James E. Webb made this point in a statement to the press in spring 1962, adding: "I do not think we shall be anxious to put a woman or any other person of particular race or creed into orbit just for the purpose of putting them there."

== Selection process ==
The U.S. Navy (USN) and U.S. Marine Corps (USMC) submitted the names of all their applicants who met the selection criteria, but the U.S. Air Force (USAF) conducted its own internal selection process, and it only submitted the names of eleven candidates. The Air Force ran them through a brief training course in May 1962 on how to speak and conduct themselves during the NASA selection process. The candidates called it a "charm school". General Curtis LeMay told them:

There are a lot of people who'll say you're deserting the Air Force if you're accepted into NASA. Well, I'm the Chief of the Air Force, and I want you to know I want you in this program. I want you to succeed in it, and that's your Air Force mission. I can't think of anything more important.

In all, 253 applications were received by the June 1, 1962, deadline. Neil Armstrong submitted his application a week after the deadline, but Walter C. Williams, the associate director of the Space Task Group, wanted Armstrong for the space program, so he had Richard Day, who acted as secretary of the selection panel, add it to the pile of applications when it arrived. Paul Bikle, the director of the NASA's Flight Research Center, and therefore Armstrong's boss, declined to recommend Armstrong for astronaut selection because he had misgivings about his performance.

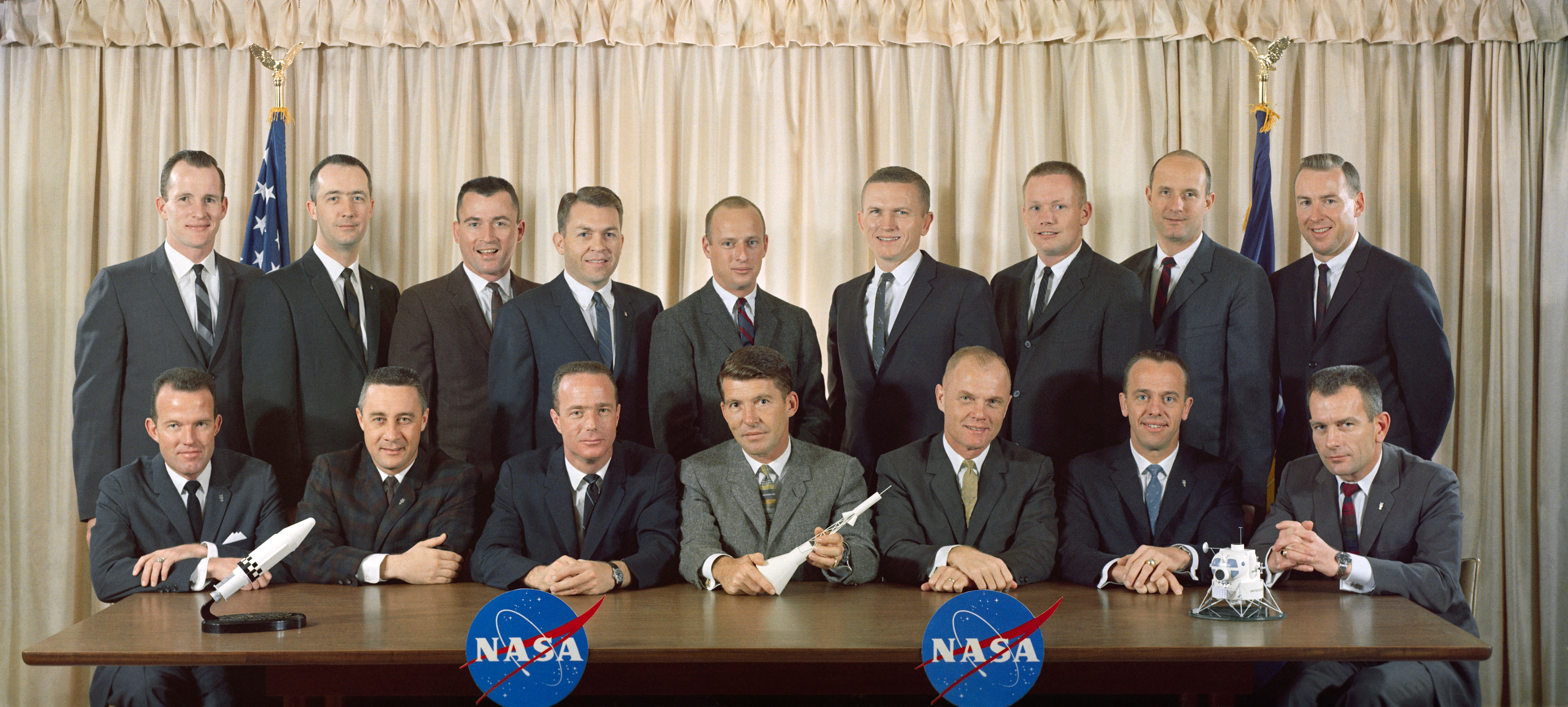
The first two groups of astronauts selected by NASA. The Mercury Seven are seated at the front, with the Next Nine standing behind them.

The three-person selection panel consisted of Mercury Seven astronauts Alan Shepard and Deke Slayton, and NASA test pilot Warren J. North, although Williams sat in on some sessions. They reduced the candidates to 32 finalists, from whom they hoped to select between five and ten new astronauts. Nine of the USAF's eleven candidates were chosen as finalists, and one of those rejected, Joe Engle, was selected with NASA Astronaut Group 5 in 1966. Of the rest, thirteen were from the Navy, four were Marines, and six were civilians. Four had been finalists in the Mercury Seven selection: Pete Conrad, Jim Lovell, John Mitchell and Robert Solliday. Lovell had not been selected for the Mercury Seven due to a high bilirubin blood count.

The finalists were sent to Brooks Air Force Base in San Antonio for medical examinations. The tests there were much the same as those employed to select the Mercury Seven. One candidate was found to be 2 inches (5 cm) too tall. Another four were eliminated on the basis of ear, nose and throat examinations. The remaining 27 then went to Ellington Air Force Base near Houston, where the Manned Spacecraft Center (MSC) was being established. They were individually interviewed by the selection panel.

Nine candidates were selected, and their names forwarded to Gilruth for approval. Slayton informed each of them by phone on September 14. The nine were Neil Armstrong, Frank Borman, Pete Conrad, Jim Lovell, James McDivitt, Elliot See, Tom Stafford, Ed White, and John Young. They arrived in Houston on September 15. To avoid tipping off the media, all checked into the Rice Hotel in Houston under the name of Max Peck, its general manager. On September 17, the media crowded into the 1800-seat Cullen Auditorium at the University of Houston for the official announcement, but it was a more low-key event than the unveiling of the Mercury Seven three years before.

As with those who had been passed over in the Mercury Seven selection, most of the rejected finalists went on to have distinguished careers. Three achieved flag rank: William E. Ramsey became a vice admiral in the Navy, William H. Fitch a lieutenant general in the Marine Corps and Kenneth Weir, a major general in the Marine Corps. Four would become NASA astronauts in later selections: Alan Bean, Michael Collins and Richard Gordon in 1963, and Jack Swigert in 1966. Francis G. Neubeck was selected as an astronaut for the Manned Orbiting Laboratory program, but never flew in space.

== Demographics ==
Like the Mercury Seven, all of the Next Nine were male and white, and all were married, with an average of two children. Unlike the Mercury Seven, not all were Protestants; McDivitt was the first Roman Catholic chosen as an astronaut. Conrad, Lovell and Young were from the Navy; Borman, McDivitt, Stafford and White from the Air Force; and Armstrong and See were civilians, although both had served in the Navy. All were test pilots, and Borman and McDivitt were also early graduates of the USAF Aerospace Research Pilot School (ARPS).

Their average age at the time of selection was 33 years and one month, compared to 34 years and ten months for the Mercury Seven when they were selected in April 1959. They had an average of 2,800 flying hours each, 1,900 of them in jets. This was 700 fewer flying hours than the Mercury Seven, but 200 more hours in jets. Their average weight was slightly higher – 161.5 pounds (73.3 kg) compared to 159 pounds (72 kg). Their mean IQ was 132 on the Wechsler Adult Intelligence Scale. All had earned Bachelor of Science degrees. Three had Master of Science degrees in aeronautical engineering: Borman from the California Institute of Technology, See from the University of California at Los Angeles, and White from University of Michigan.

== Group members ==
Next Nine astronauts
Image	Name	Born	Died	Mission(s)	Career	Ref.
Portrait	Neil A. Armstrong	Wapakoneta, Ohio, August 5, 1930	Fairfield, Ohio, August 25, 2012		Armstrong graduated from Purdue University with a Bachelor of Science degree in aeronautical engineering in 1955. He flew 78 combat missions in the Korean War as a naval aviator, and then became a test pilot for the National Advisory Committee for Aeronautics (the forerunner of NASA) at the High-Speed Flight Station at Edwards Air Force Base, where he flew the X-15 rocket-powered aircraft. He made his first spaceflight as commander of Gemini 8 in March 1966, becoming NASA's first civilian astronaut to fly in space. During this mission with pilot David Scott, he performed the first docking of two spacecraft, but the mission was aborted after Armstrong was compelled to use some of his re-entry control fuel to address a dangerous roll caused by a stuck thruster. During training for his second and last spaceflight, as commander of Apollo 11, he ejected from the Lunar Landing Research Vehicle moments before a crash. In July 1969, he and his lunar module pilot, Buzz Aldrin, became the first people to land on the Moon. Armstrong was the first person to step onto its surface, and he spent two and a half hours outside the spacecraft. He earned a Master of Science degree in aerospace engineering from the University of Southern California in 1970. He resigned from NASA in 1971, and taught aerospace engineering at the University of Cincinnati until 1979. He served on the Apollo 13 accident investigation, and on the Rogers Commission, which investigated the Space Shuttle Challenger disaster.	
Portrait	Frank F. Borman II	Gary, Indiana, March 14, 1928	Billings, Montana, November 7, 2023		Borman received a Bachelor of Science degree from the United States Military Academy at West Point, in 1950. He joined the USAF and became a fighter pilot. He earned a Master of Science degree in aeronautical engineering from the California Institute of Technology in 1957. He was an assistant professor of thermodynamics and fluid mechanics at West Point from 1957 to 1960. He graduated from the USAF Experimental Test Pilot School with Class 60-C, and from the ARPS with Class I. He was initially selected for Gemini 5 with Mercury astronaut Gus Grissom, but Grissom was moved to Gemini 3, with Young as his pilot. Borman commanded the Gemini 7 mission in December 1965. On this mission he and Lovell spent two weeks in space, during which they performed the first space rendezvous with Gemini 6A. After the January 1967 Apollo 1 fire in which astronauts Grissom, White, and Roger Chaffee died, he was the astronaut representative on the accident investigation board. In December 1968, he commanded Apollo 8, the first crewed circumlunar mission. He retired from NASA and the USAF in 1970 and joined Eastern Airlines, eventually becoming its Chairman of the Board in December 1976.	
Portrait	Charles (Pete) Conrad Jr.	Philadelphia, Pennsylvania, June 2, 1930	Ojai, California, July 8, 1999		Conrad graduated from Princeton University in 1953 with a Bachelor of Science degree in aeronautical engineering. He joined the Navy and became a naval aviator. In 1958, he graduated from the United States Naval Test Pilot School at Naval Air Station Patuxent River, Patuxent, Maryland as part of Class 20. He set an eight-day space endurance record along with his command pilot, Mercury astronaut Gordon Cooper, on his first spaceflight, the Gemini 5 mission in August 1965. The following year he commanded the Gemini 11 mission, on which he and pilot Dick Gordon set an altitude record of 850 miles (1,370 km). He became the third person to walk on the Moon as commander of Apollo 12 in 1969 after landing the lunar module Intrepid in the Ocean of Storms. He and pilot Alan Bean made two moonwalks, recovering components from the Surveyor 3 probe, which had landed there two years before. In 1973 he commanded Skylab 2, the first crewed Skylab mission, and spent 28 more days in space. On this mission, he and his crewmates repaired significant launch damage to the Skylab space station. He retired from NASA and the Navy in 1973.	
Portrait	James A. Lovell Jr.	Cleveland, Ohio, March 25, 1928	Lake Forest, Illinois, August 7, 2025		Lovell graduated with a Bachelor of Science degree from the United States Naval Academy at Annapolis, Maryland, with the Class of 1952, and became a naval aviator. In 1958, he graduated from the United States Naval Test Pilot School with Class 20. He flew as the pilot of the Gemini 7 mission in December 1965 during which he and Borman spent two weeks in space and conducted the first space rendezvous with Gemini 6A. In November 1966 he commanded the Gemini 12 mission with Buzz Aldrin as his pilot. He was the command module pilot on the Apollo 8 mission in December 1968, during which he, Borman and Bill Anders conducted the first crewed circumlunar mission. In April 1970, he became the first person to fly in space four times, and the first to travel to the Moon twice, when he commanded the ill-fated Apollo 13 mission. He resigned from NASA and the Navy on March 1, 1973.	
Portrait	James A. McDivitt	Chicago, Illinois, June 10, 1929	Tucson, Arizona, October 13, 2022		McDivitt joined the USAF in 1951 and flew 145 combat missions in the Korean War. He received a Bachelor of Science degree in aeronautical engineering from the University of Michigan, graduating first in the class in 1959. That year he also graduated from the USAF Experimental Test Pilot School with Class 59-C, and he graduated from the ARPS with Class I in 1960. He commanded the Gemini 4 mission, during which White performed the first U.S. spacewalk. He was the first astronaut to command his first space mission. In March 1969, he commanded the Apollo 9 flight, which was the first crewed flight test of the Lunar Module and the complete set of Apollo flight hardware. He later became Manager of Lunar Landing Operations and was the Apollo Spacecraft Program Manager from 1969 to 1972. In February 1972, he was promoted to the rank of brigadier general, becoming the first astronaut to reach that rank. He retired from NASA and the USAF later that year to pursue a career in the aviation industry, and became a senior vice president at Rockwell International.	
Portrait	Elliot M. See, Jr.	Dallas, Texas, July 23, 1927	St. Louis, Missouri, February 28, 1966	None (Died before flight)	See graduated from the United States Merchant Marine Academy in 1949 with a Bachelor of Science degree in marine engineering and a commission in the United States Naval Reserve. That year he joined General Electric. He served on active duty with the U.S. Navy from 1953 to 1956, then rejoined General Electric, becoming a test pilot. He earned a Master of Science degree in aeronautical engineering from the University of California in Los Angeles in 1962. See was chosen as the command pilot of Gemini 9, but died in a T-38 plane crash less than four months before launch.	
Portrait	Thomas P. Stafford	Weatherford, Oklahoma, September 17, 1930	Satellite Beach, Florida, March 18, 2024	Apollo–Soyuz	Stafford graduated with a Bachelor of Science degree from the United States Naval Academy at Annapolis, Maryland with the Class of 1952 and joined the USAF. He graduated from the USAF Experimental Test Pilot School with Class 58-C. He made his first spaceflight in December 1965 as the pilot of Gemini 6A, which made the first space rendezvous, with Gemini 7. In June of the following year he commanded Gemini 9A. In 1969, Stafford was the commander of Apollo 10, the second crewed mission to orbit the Moon and the first to fly a Lunar Module in lunar orbit, descending to an altitude of 9 miles (14 km) above its surface. On the return to Earth, the Apollo 10 spacecraft achieved a speed of 24,791 miles per hour (39,897 km/h), setting the record for the fastest speed achieved by human beings. In 1975, Stafford was the commander of the Apollo-Soyuz Test Project flight, the first joint U.S.-Soviet space mission. He was a brigadier general at the time of the mission, becoming the first general officer to fly in space, as well as the first member of his Naval Academy class to pin on the first, second, and third stars of a general officer. He retired from the USAF in 1979.	
Portrait	Edward H. White II	San Antonio, Texas, November 14, 1930	Cape Canaveral, Florida, January 27, 1967		White received a Bachelor of Science degree from the United States Military Academy at West Point, graduating with the Class of 1952. He joined the USAF and became a fighter pilot. He earned a Master of Science degree in aeronautical engineering from the University of Michigan in 1959. He graduated from the USAF Experimental Test Pilot School with Class 59-C. In June 1965, he flew on Gemini 4 as its pilot, during which he conducted the first American spacewalk. He was selected as the Senior Pilot of Apollo 1, the inaugural flight of the Apollo spacecraft. White was killed in the fire on the launch pad test in January 1967, a month before the scheduled liftoff.	
Portrait	John W. Young	San Francisco, California, September 24, 1930	Houston, Texas, January 5, 2018		Young graduated from Georgia Institute of Technology with a Bachelor of Science degree in aeronautical engineering in 1952 and joined the Navy. He set world time-to-climb records for 3,000 metres (9,800 ft) and 25,000 metres (82,000 ft). His first space mission was as pilot of Gemini 3, the first crewed Gemini mission, in March 1965. He went on to command Gemini 10 in July 1966. In May 1969, he was Command Module pilot of Apollo 10, the "dress rehearsal" for the Apollo 11 Moon landing. On the way back to Earth, the Apollo 10 crew reached a speed of 24,791 miles per hour (39,897 km/h), the highest speed attained by a crewed vehicle. He returned to the Moon in April 1972 as commander of Apollo 16, the fifth crewed lunar landing, becoming the ninth person to walk on the Moon and the second to fly to it twice. He served as Chief of the Astronaut Office from 1974 to 1987. In April 1981, he commanded the STS-1 mission, the maiden flight of the Space Shuttle Columbia. When he commanded STS-9, the first Spacelab mission, in November 1983, he became the first person to travel into space six times.	

== Assimilation ==
The new astronauts became known as the Next Nine, or the New Nine. They moved to the Houston area in October 1962. Most of them bought lots and built houses in Nassau Bay, a new development to the east of the MSC. Conrad and Lovell built houses in Timber Cove, south of the MSC. Developers in Timber Cove and Nassau Bay offered astronauts mortgages with small down payments and low interest rates. The MSC complex was not yet complete, so NASA temporarily leased office space in Houston. Slayton's wife Marge and Borman's wife Susan organized an Astronauts' Wives Club along the lines of the Officers' Wives Clubs that were a feature of military bases. As Slayton was in charge of astronaut activities, Marge was considered to be the equivalent of the commanding officer's wife. The nine were honored guests at Houston society parties, such as those thrown by socialite Joanne Herring, and their wives received $1,000 Neiman Marcus gift vouchers (equivalent to $11,000 in 2025) from an anonymous source.

A lawyer, Henry Batten, agreed to negotiate a deal with Field Enterprises for their personal stories, along the lines of the Life magazine deal enjoyed by the Mercury Seven, for no fee. As with the Life deal, there was some disquiet about the propriety of astronauts cashing in on government-created fame, but Mercury Seven astronaut John Glenn intervened, and personally raised the matter with Kennedy, who approved the deal. The deals with Field and Time-Life (which owned Life magazine) earned each of the Next Nine astronauts $16,250 (equivalent to $173,000 in 2025) per annum over the next four years, and provided them with $100,000 life insurance policies (equivalent to $1,064,000 in 2025). Due to the dangerous nature of an astronaut's job, insurance companies would have charged them unaffordably high premiums.

== Training ==
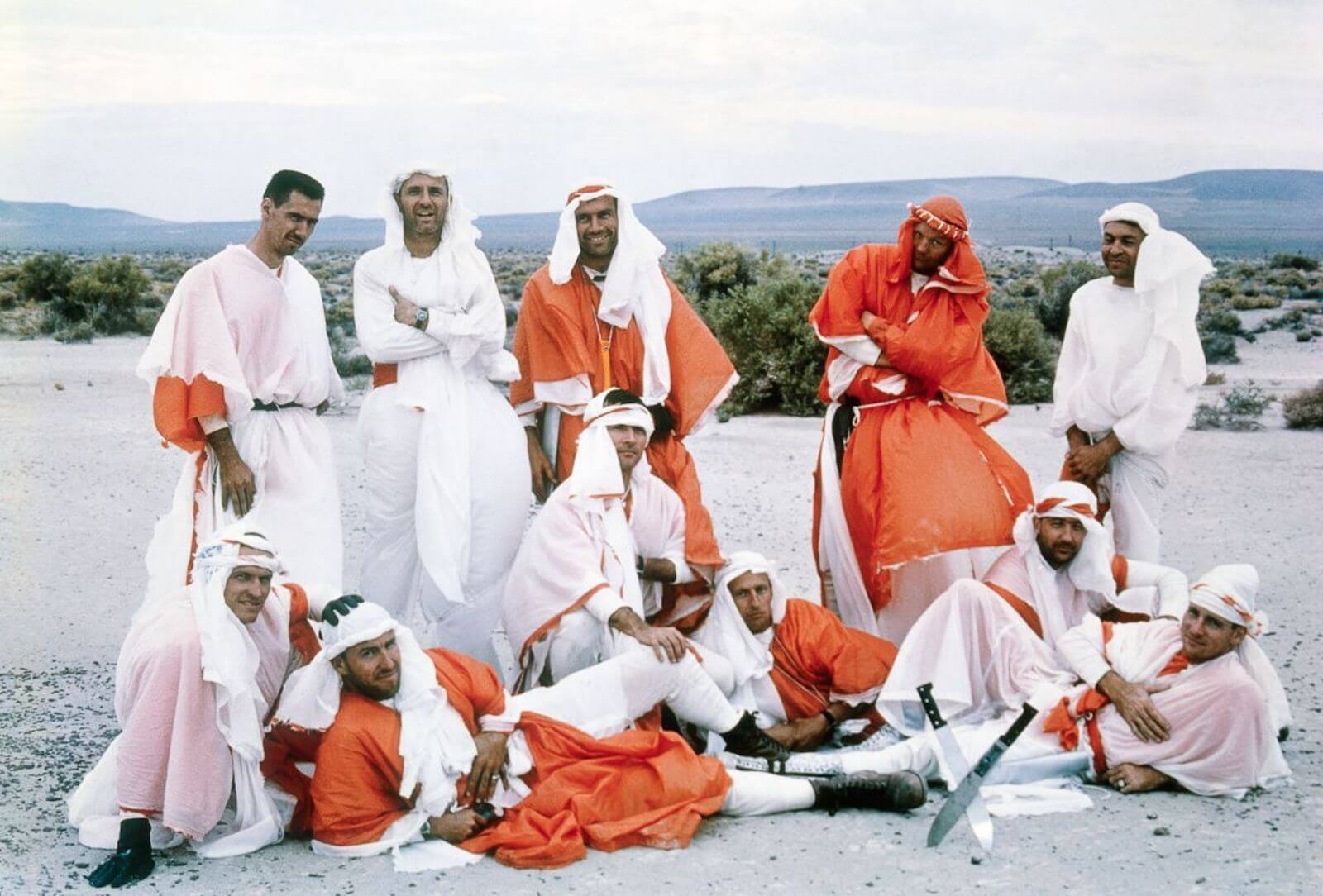
The Next Nine during desert survival training in Nevada in August 1963. Front row, left to right: Borman, Lovell, Young, Conrad, McDivitt, White. Back row, left to right: Raymond Zedehar, Stafford, Slayton, Armstrong and See

Astronaut training was supervised by Raymond Zedehar, who reported to Warren North, the Director of Flight Crew Operations at the MSC. Initially, each of the astronauts was given four months' of classroom instruction on subjects such as spacecraft propulsion, orbital mechanics, astronomy, computing, and space medicine. Classes were for six hours a day, two days a week. There was also familiarization with the Gemini spacecraft, Titan II and Atlas boosters, and the Agena target vehicle. After classroom training was completed, there was a series of seminars on space science. The astronaut's lack of scientific training was recognized, but it was hoped that this would bring their knowledge up to a level where they could communicate with scientists. The first was delivered by Homer E. Newell Jr., NASA's Director of Space Sciences. Subsequent seminars covered topics such as the USAF's X-15 and X-20 Dyna-Soar programs, and the development of nuclear rocket engines. Geologist Eugene Shoemaker developed a training plan to teach the astronauts the fundamentals of selenology, the geology of the Moon. In January 1963 they went to Flagstaff, Arizona, where they studied the Meteor Crater and lava flows, and observed the Moon through the telescope at the Lowell Observatory.

In Zero-G training at Wright-Patterson Air Force Base in Ohio on May 20, 1963, each the Next Nine astronauts flew two flights in a reduced-gravity aircraft, a modified KC-135 Stratotanker aircraft. Each flight flew 20 parabolas that gave them between 20 and 30 seconds of weightlessness. Jungle survival training was conducted for all sixteen Mercury Seven and Next Nine astronauts at the USAF Tropic Survival School at Albrook Air Force Station in Panama in June. This was the first time that the two groups had trained together. This was followed in August by desert survival training at Stead Air Force Base in Nevada, and field exercises at Carson Sink. Each astronaut had to survive on four liters (ten U.S. pints) of water and the food in their spacecraft survival packs. In September, all sixteen were given instruction in parachute landings on land and water, but only the Next Nine attended the second phase of the program, water survival training on the Dilbert Dunker at the USN school at the Naval Air Station Pensacola in Florida and on Galveston Bay.

Following the precedent set by the Mercury Seven, each of the Next Nine was assigned a special area in which to develop expertise that could be shared with the others, and to provide astronaut input to designers and engineers. Armstrong was responsible for trainers and simulators; Borman for boosters, with special responsibility for abort systems; Conrad for cockpit layout, pilot controls and systems integration; Lovell for recovery systems, including the parachutes, paraglider and lunar module; McDivitt for guidance and navigation systems; See for electrical systems and coordination of mission planning; Stafford for communications systems, mission control and the ground support network; White for flight control systems, and Young for environmental control systems, survival gear, personal equipment and space suits.

== Legacy ==
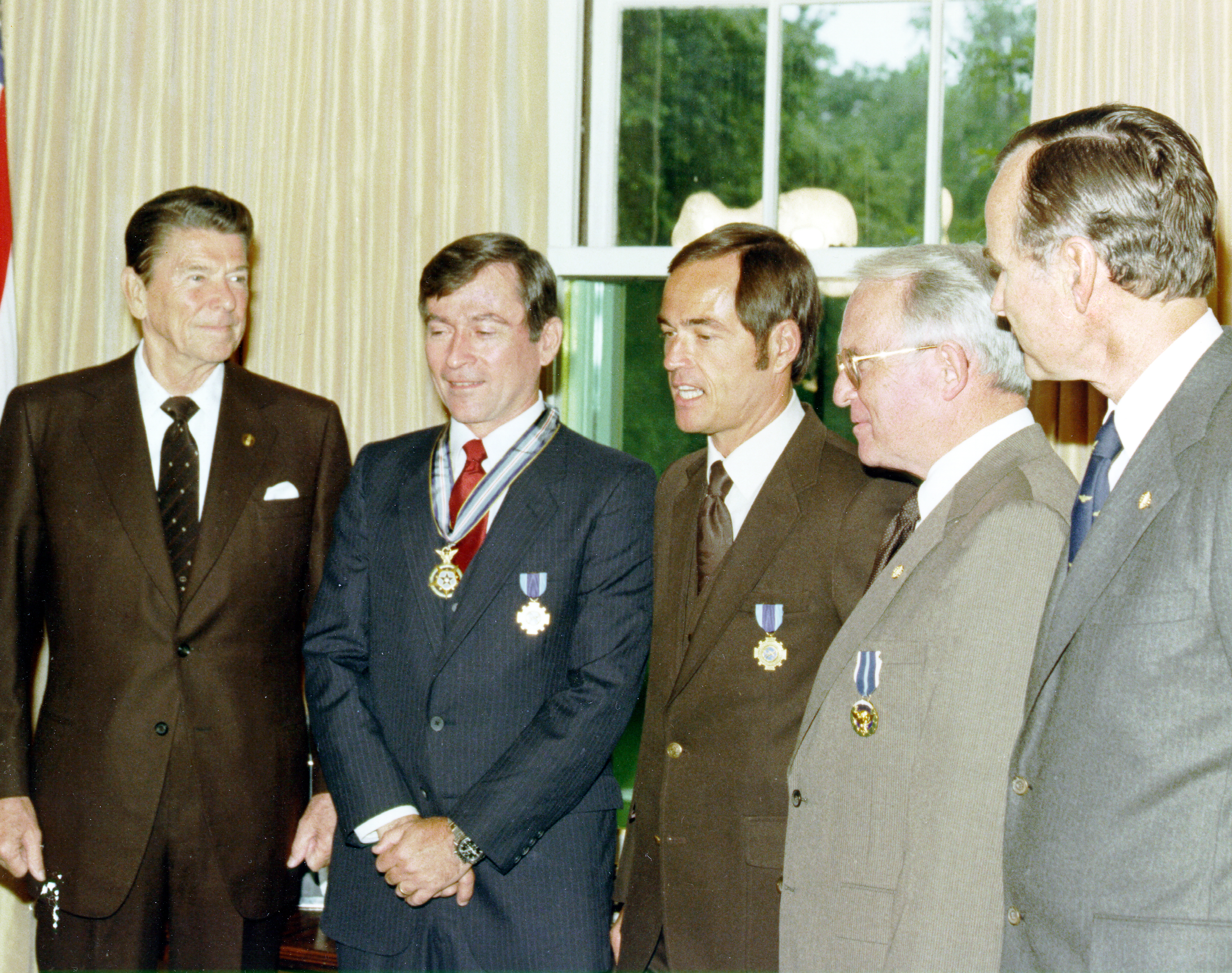
President Ronald Reagan presents John Young with the Congressional Space Medal of Honor as well as NASA's Distinguished Service Medal.

Collins wrote that in his opinion "this group of nine was the best NASA ever picked, better than the seven that preceded it, or the fourteen, five, nineteen, eleven and seven that followed." Slayton felt so too, describing them as "probably the best all-round group ever put together." Looking over the tentative schedule of Apollo missions, Slayton calculated that up to 14 three-person crews might be required, but the 16 astronauts on hand could fill just five. Though he considered the schedule to be optimistic, he did not want a shortage of astronauts to be the reason the schedule could not be met, and he therefore proposed another round of recruiting. On June 5, 1963, NASA announced that it was seeking another ten to fifteen new astronauts.

The Next Nine went on to careers as astronauts. Apart from See and White, who were killed in a T-38 crash and in the Apollo fire, respectively, all went on to command Gemini and Apollo missions. Six of the nine flew to the Moon (Lovell and Young twice), and Armstrong, Conrad and Young walked on it as well. Seven of the nine received the Congressional Space Medal of Honor for their service.

- Armstrong, for commanding Apollo 11, the first lunar landing;
- Borman, for commanding Apollo 8, the first crewed mission to the Moon;
- Conrad, for commanding Skylab 2, and saving the damaged station;
- Lovell, for commanding the ill-fated Apollo 13;
- Stafford, for commanding the international Cold War Apollo-Soyuz Test Project;
- White, posthumously, killed in the Apollo 1 fire; and
- Young, for commanding the first Space Shuttle mission, STS-1, in Columbia.

== General references ==
- Atkinson, Joseph D. & Shafritz, Jay M. (1985). The Real Stuff: A History of NASA's Astronaut Recruitment Program. Praeger special studies. New York: Praeger. ISBN 978-0-03-005187-6. OCLC 12052375.
- Borman, Frank & Serling, Robert J. (1988). Countdown: An Autobiography. New York: Silver Arrow. ISBN 0-688-07929-6. OCLC 17983615.
- Brooks, Courtney G.; Grimwood, James M. & Swenson, Loyd S. Jr. (1979). Chariots for Apollo: A History of Manned Lunar Spacecraft. NASA History Series. Washington, D.C.: Scientific and Technical Information Branch, NASA. ISBN 978-0-486-46756-6. LCCN 79001042. OCLC 4664449. SP-4205.
- Burgess, Colin (2011). Selecting the Mercury Seven: The Search for America's First Astronauts. Springer-Praxis books in space exploration. New York; London: Springer. ISBN 978-1-4419-8405-0. OCLC 747105631.
- Burgess, Colin (2013). Moon Bound: Choosing and Preparing NASA's Lunar Astronauts. Springer-Praxis books in space exploration. New York; London: Springer. ISBN 978-1-4614-3854-0. OCLC 905162781.
- Collins, Michael (2001) [1974]. Carrying the Fire: An Astronaut's Journeys. New York: Cooper Square Press. ISBN 978-0-8154-1028-7. OCLC 45755963.
- Conrad, Nancy & Klausner, Howard (May 2005). Rocketman: Astronaut Pete Conrad's Incredible Ride to the Moon and Beyond. New York: New American Library. ISBN 0-451-21509-5. OCLC 57311427.
- French, Francis & Burgess, Colin (2007). In the Shadow of the Moon: A Challenging Journey to Tranquility. Lincoln, Nebraska: University of Nebraska Press. ISBN 978-0-8032-1128-5. OCLC 804741762.
- Hacker, Barton C. & Grimwood, James M. (2010) [1977]. On the Shoulders of Titans: A History of Project Gemini (PDF). NASA History Series. Washington, D.C.: NASA History Division, Office of Policy and Plans. ISBN 978-0-16-067157-9. OCLC 945144787. NASA SP-4203.
- Hansen, James R. (2012). First Man: The Life of Neil A. Armstrong. New York: Simon & Schuster. ISBN 978-1-4767-2781-3. OCLC 1029741947.
- Kluger, Jeffrey & Lovell, Jim (July 1995). Lost Moon: The Perilous Voyage of Apollo 13. New York: Pocket Books. ISBN 0-671-53464-5. OCLC 1053909345.
- Koppel, Lily (2013). The Astronaut Wives Club. New York: Grand Central Publishing. ISBN 978-1-4555-0325-4. OCLC 816563627.
- Morse, Mary Louise & Bays, Jean Kernahan (1973). "The Apollo Spacecraft – A Chronology, Volume II: November 8, 1962 – September 30, 1964" (PDF). The NASA Historical Series. Washington, D.C.: NASA. NASA SP-4009.
- Slayton, Donald K. "Deke" & Cassutt, Michael (1994). Deke! U.S. Manned Space: From Mercury to the Shuttle. New York: Forge. ISBN 978-0-312-85503-1. OCLC 937566894.
- Stafford, Thomas P. & Cassutt, Michael (2002). We Have Capture. Washington, D.C.: Smithsonian Institution Press. ISBN 978-1-58834-070-2. OCLC 829407543.
- Swenson, Loyd S. Jr.; Grimwood, James M. & Alexander, Charles C. (1966). This New Ocean: A History of Project Mercury (PDF). The NASA History Series. Washington, DC: National Aeronautics and Space Administration. OCLC 569889. NASA SP-4201.
- Wolfe, Tom (1979). The Right Stuff. New York: Farrar, Straus and Giroux. ISBN 978-0-553-27556-8. OCLC 849889526.
