= Joe Engle =

American astronaut (1932–2024)

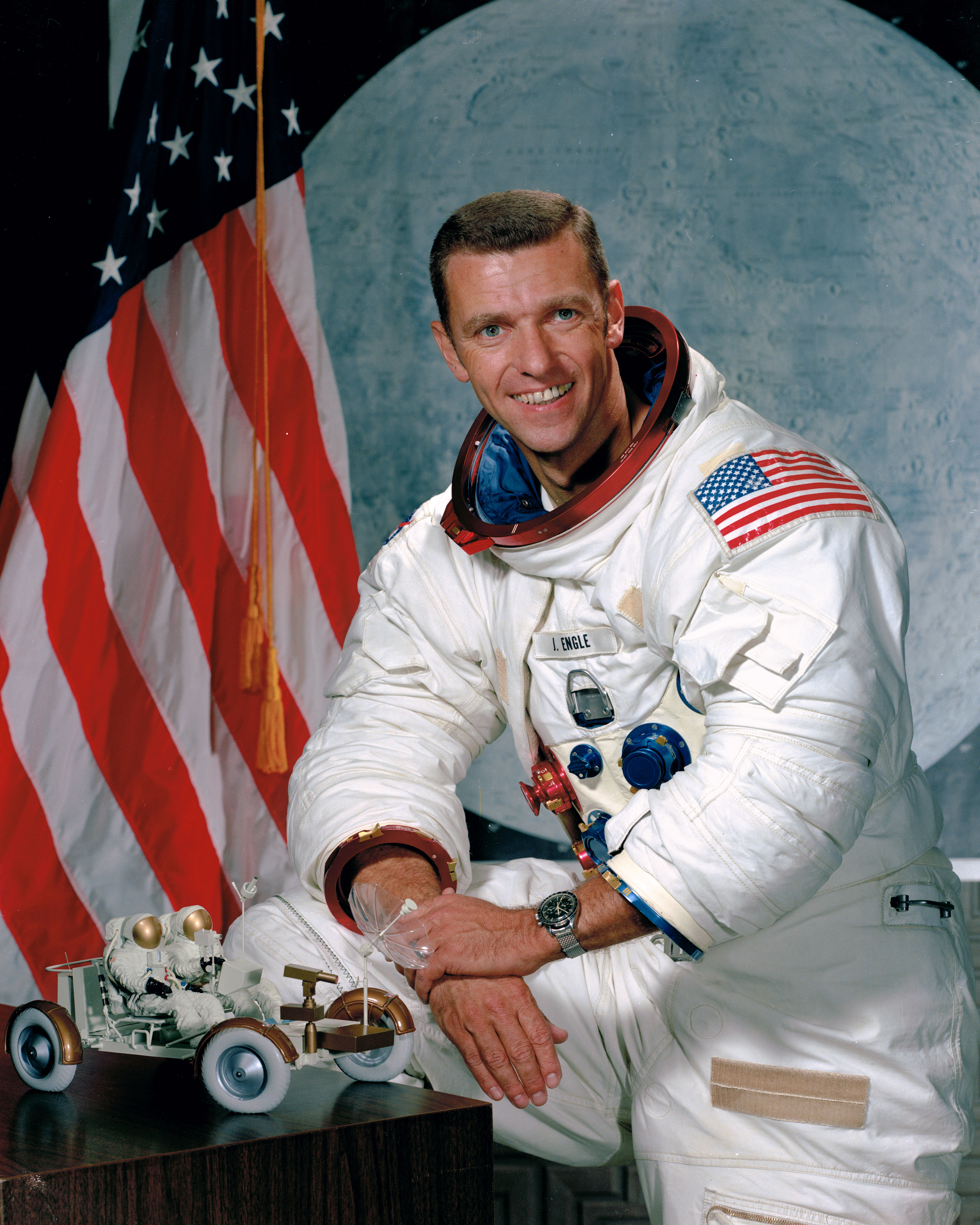
- Engle in 1971
- Born: August 26, 1932; Abilene, Kansas, U.S.
- Died: July 10, 2024 (aged 91); Houston, Texas, U.S.
- Resting place: Arlington National Cemetery, Arlington, Virginia, U.S.
- Education: University of Kansas (BS)
- Awards: Distinguished Flying Cross; NASA Distinguished Service Medal
- Space career

NASA astronaut
- Rank: Major General, USAF/ANG
- Time in space: 9d 8h 30m
- Selection: NASA Group 5 (1966)
- Missions: X-15 Flight 138; X-15 Flight 143; X-15 Flight 153; ALT, Crew 2; STS-2; STS-51-I
- Retired: November 28, 1986

Joe Henry Engle (August 26, 1932 – July 10, 2024) was an American pilot, aeronautical engineer, and NASA astronaut. He was the commander of two Space Shuttle missions including STS-2 in 1981, the program's second orbital flight. He also flew two flights in the Shuttle program's 1977 Approach and Landing Tests. Engle was one of twelve pilots who flew the North American X-15, an experimental spaceplane jointly operated by the Air Force and NASA.

As an X-15 pilot, Engle made three flights above 50 miles (80 km), thus qualifying for astronaut wings under the American convention for the boundary of space. In 1966, he was selected for NASA's 5th Astronaut Group, joining the Apollo program. He was backup Lunar Module Pilot (LMP) for Apollo 14 and was originally scheduled to walk on the Moon as LMP for Apollo 17. However, cancellation of later flights prompted NASA to select geologist-astronaut Harrison Schmitt as the Lunar Module Pilot, displacing Engle.

== Biography ==
=== Personal life and education ===
Joe Henry Engle was born on August 26, 1932, in Abilene, Kansas. He was raised in Chapman, Kansas, where he attended primary and secondary school. Engle graduated from Dickinson County High School in 1950. He was active as a Boy Scout and earned the rank of First Class. Engle received a Bachelor of Science degree in Aerospace Engineering from the University of Kansas in 1955, where he was a member of the Theta Tau Professional Engineering Fraternity.

Engle was married to the former Mary Catherine Lawrence (1934–2004) of Mission Hills, Kansas, and had two children and one stepchild. After her death, he married Jeanie Carter of Houston, Texas. Engle's recreational interests included flying (including World War II fighter aircraft), big game hunting, backpacking, and athletics. He was a member of the Society of Experimental Test Pilots and became a Fellow in 2009.

Engle died at his home in Houston, Texas on July 10, 2024, at the age of 91. With Engle's death, all 12 pilots to fly the X-15 are now deceased.

=== Flight experience ===
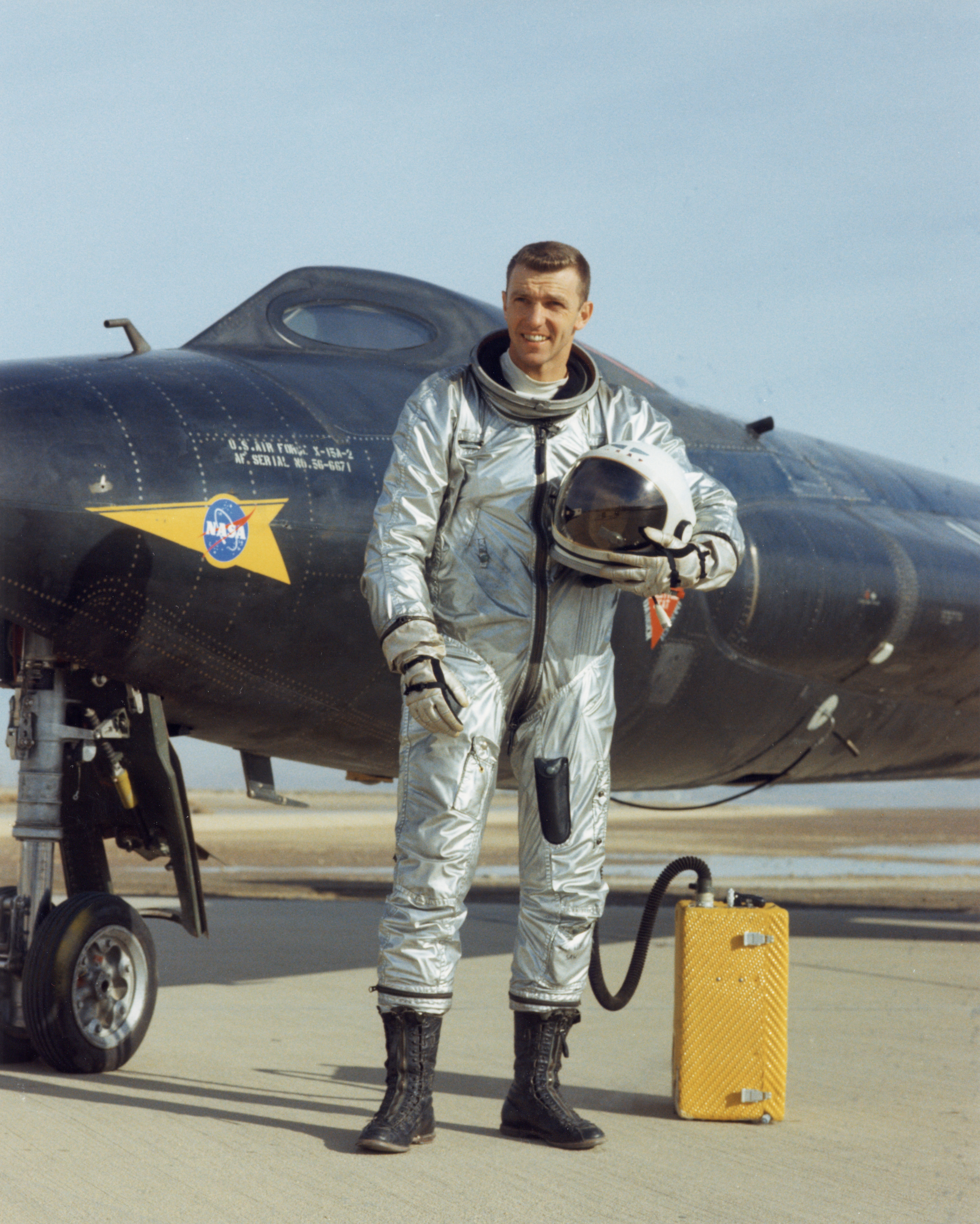
Engle with the X-15A-2 aircraft in 1965

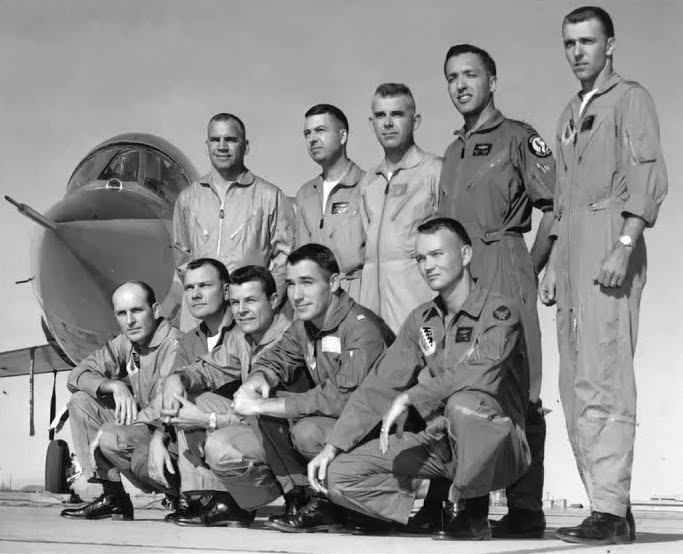
ARPS Class III graduates. Front row: Ed Givens, Tommie Benefield, Charlie Bassett, Greg Neubeck and Mike Collins. Back row: Al Atwell, Neil Garland, Jim Roman, Al Uhalt and Engle

Engle received his commission in the U.S. Air Force through the Air Force Reserve Officer Training Corps at the University of Kansas. While in school he was a member of the Professional Engineering Fraternity Theta Tau, and decided to become a test pilot. While working at Cessna Aircraft during the summer, he learned how to fly from a fellow draftsman, Henry Dittmer.

Engle entered flying school in 1957, and received his pilot wings in 1958. He flew the F-100 Super Sabre with the 474th Fighter Day Squadron and the 309th Tactical Fighter Squadron at George Air Force Base, California. Chuck Yeager recommended Engle for Air Force Experimental Flight Test Pilot School (Class 61C), from which he graduated in 1961, and he was later assigned to the third class of the Aerospace Research Pilot School (Class III), despite his reluctance to leave "stick and rudder" flying for a space capsule.

After serving as a test pilot in the Fighter Test Group at Edwards Air Force Base, California, Engle was a test pilot in the X-15 research program at Edwards from June 1963 until his assignment to the Manned Spacecraft Center (now the Lyndon B. Johnson Space Center). Engle had applied with fellow ARPS student Charles Bassett and Michael Collins to the third NASA astronaut group, but the Air Force withdrew Engle's NASA application and instead chose him to replace Robert M. White in the X-15 program, which pleased Engle.

Engle's parents witnessed his X-15 flight of June 29, 1965, which exceeded an altitude of 50 miles (80 km) and qualified him for astronaut wings; he again exceeded 50 miles twice during his career of 16 flights. On his final X-15 mission, free flight 153 (1-61-101), which took place on October 14, 1965, he became the first of only two pilots to accomplish a sub-orbital space flight in an X-15 without the benefit of the assistance provided by the MH-96 adaptive flight control system. Despite what he later called "the best flying job in the world", Engle decided to apply again to NASA as he expected to be rotated to another Air Force assignment within a year and hoped to go to the Moon.

Engle flew over 185 different types of aircraft (25 different fighters) during his career, logging more than 15,400 hours flight time of which 9,000 were in jet aircraft.

=== NASA career ===
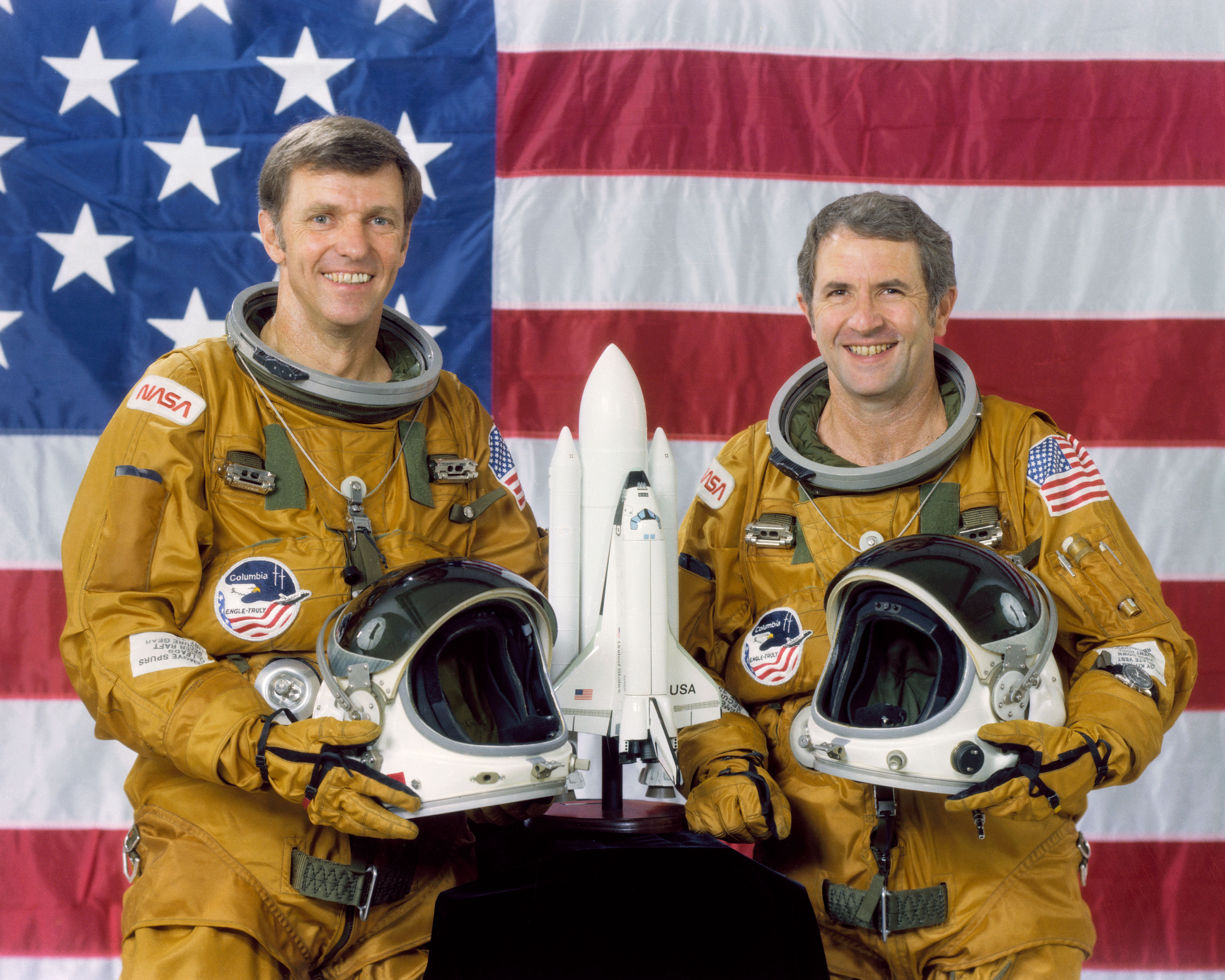
Engle, commander of the STS-2 mission, with Richard Truly, pilot

Engle was one of 19 astronauts selected by NASA in April 1966. He served on the support crew for Apollo 10. He then served as backup Lunar Module Pilot for the Apollo 14 mission. He was due to land on the Moon as Lunar Module Pilot for Apollo 17, but was replaced by geologist Harrison Schmitt. This was a result of pressure from the scientific community to have a professional geologist explore the Moon, and not just test pilot engineers who had been given rudimentary geology training. In response to getting bumped from Apollo 17, he said "When you think about it, the lunar missions were geology-oriented."

According to Engle, Deke Slayton asked him whether he would prefer to fly on Skylab, Apollo–Soyuz, or the Space Shuttle; Engle responded that he would prefer the Shuttle as it was an airplane.

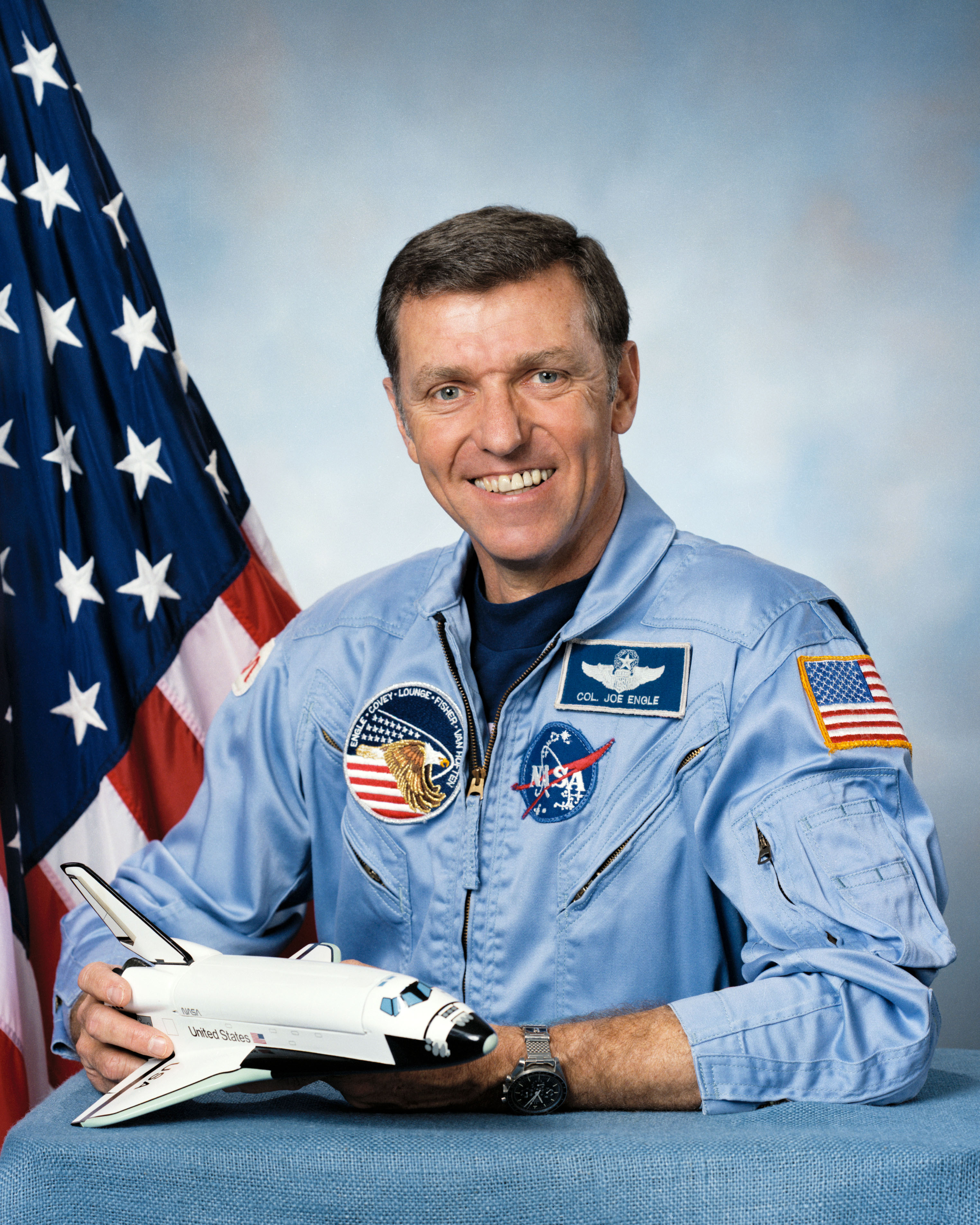
Joe Engle flew two missions as Space Shuttle commander.

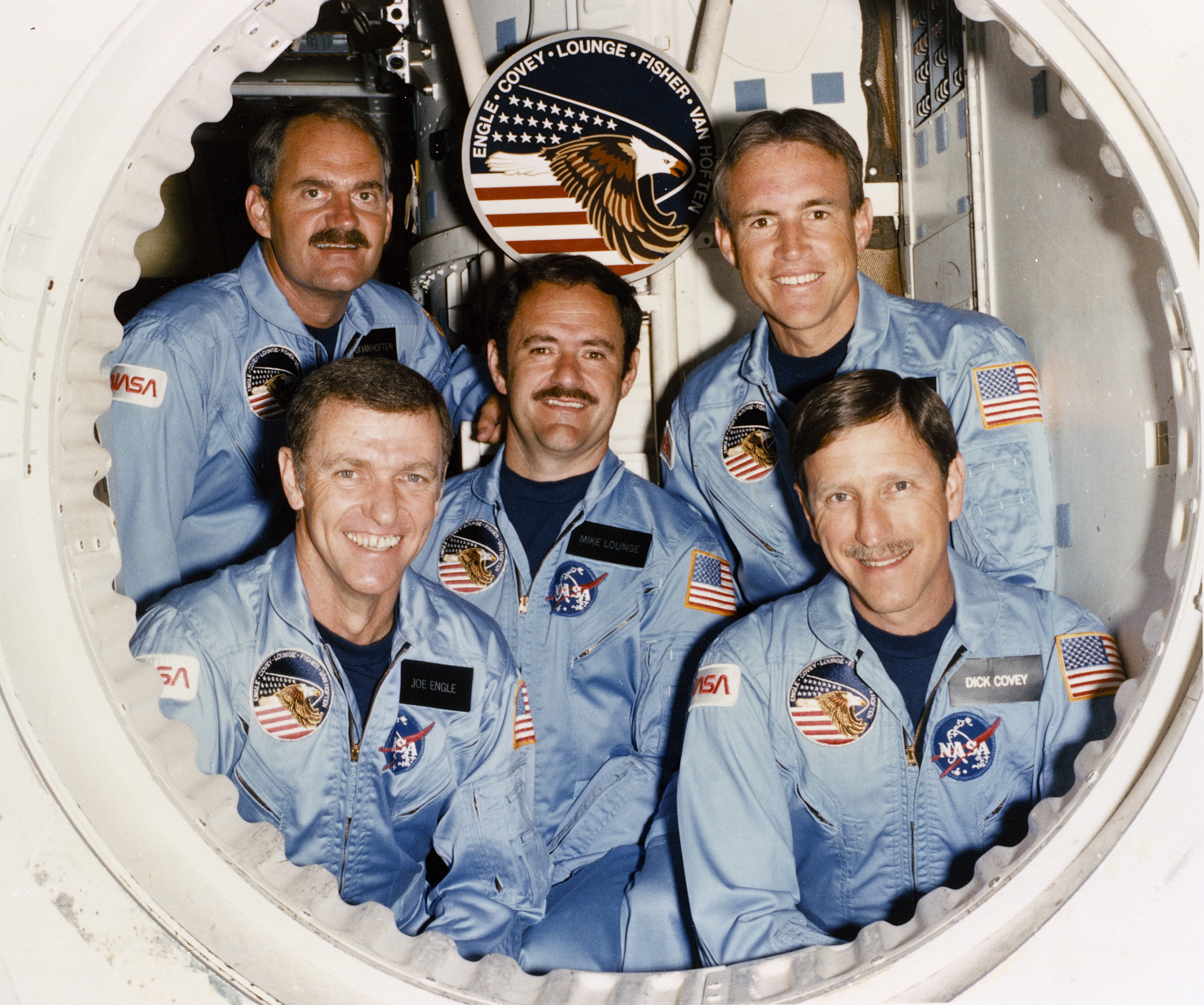
The crew of the STS-51-I mission. Engle is at the lower left.

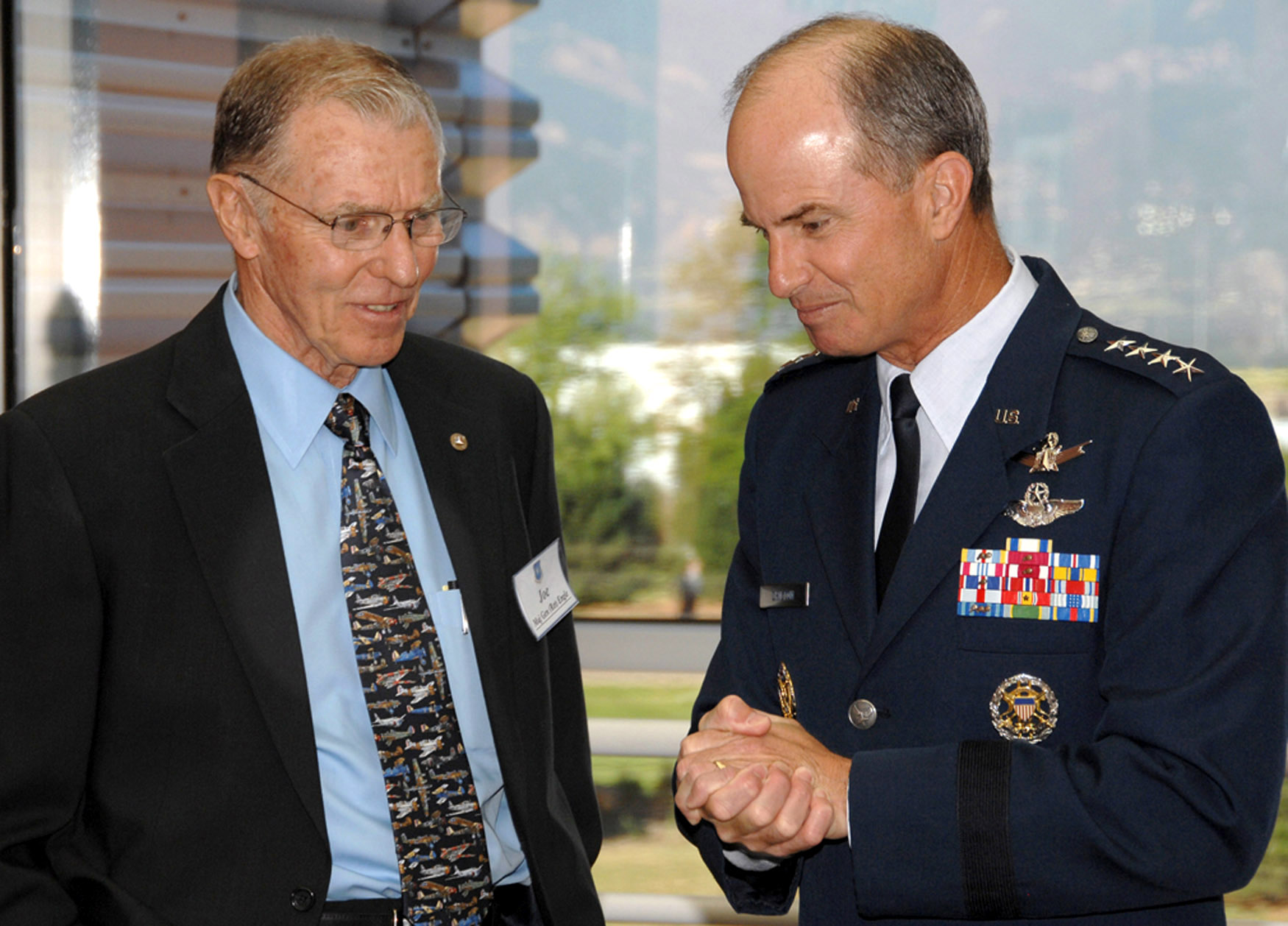
Major General Joe Engle with fellow astronaut General Kevin P. Chilton

Engle was commander of one of the two crews that flew the Space Shuttle Approach and Landing Test Flights from June through October 1977. The Space Shuttle Enterprise was carried to 25,000 feet on top of the Boeing 747 carrier aircraft, and then released for its two-minute glide flight to landing. In this series of flight tests, Engle evaluated the Orbiter handling qualities and landing characteristics, and obtained the stability and control, and performance data in the subsonic flight envelope for the Space Shuttle. He was the backup commander for STS-1, the first orbital test flight of Space Shuttle Columbia. Together with pilot Richard Truly he flew as commander on the second flight of the Space Shuttle, STS-2, becoming the last NASA rookie to command a spaceflight until Raja Chari in 2021 on SpaceX Crew-3. He was also mission commander on STS-51-I and logged over 225 hours in space.

Engle was one of two people to have flown into space on two different types of winged vehicles: the X-15 and the Space Shuttle, on STS-2 (the other person being Frederick W. Sturckow). Engle manually flew large numbers of flight-test maneuvers on the Shuttle during reentry and landing; periods of manually flown test maneuvers were interspersed with periods of computer control.

He served as deputy associate administrator for manned space flight at NASA Headquarters from March to December 1982. He retained his astronaut flight status and returned to Johnson Space Center in January 1983. He also participated in the Challenger disaster investigation in 1986, and did other consulting work on the Shuttle well into the 1990s.

=== Post-NASA career ===
Engle retired from the USAF with the rank of colonel on November 14, 1986, and from NASA on November 28, 1986. On December 1, 1986, he was appointed by the Governor of Kansas and the United States Secretary of the Air Force to a billet in the Kansas Air National Guard at the rank of brigadier general, initially serving as a special assistant to the adjutant general. Under this arrangement, Engle was permitted to retain Houston residency. The discrepancy between his Air Force and Air National Guard ranks was rectified by Senate confirmation of his promotion on February 2, 1988. He subsequently served as Air National Guard assistant to the commander in chief, United States Space Command and North American Air Defense Command (NORAD), with headquarters at Peterson Air Force Base, Colorado. Engle ultimately retired from the Air National Guard around 1991 at the rank of major general, a promotion previously confirmed by the Senate on June 22, 1989.

In 1992, he was inducted into the Aerospace Walk of Honor. In 2001, Engle was inducted into the National Aviation Hall of Fame and the U.S. Astronaut Hall of Fame.

== Awards and honors ==
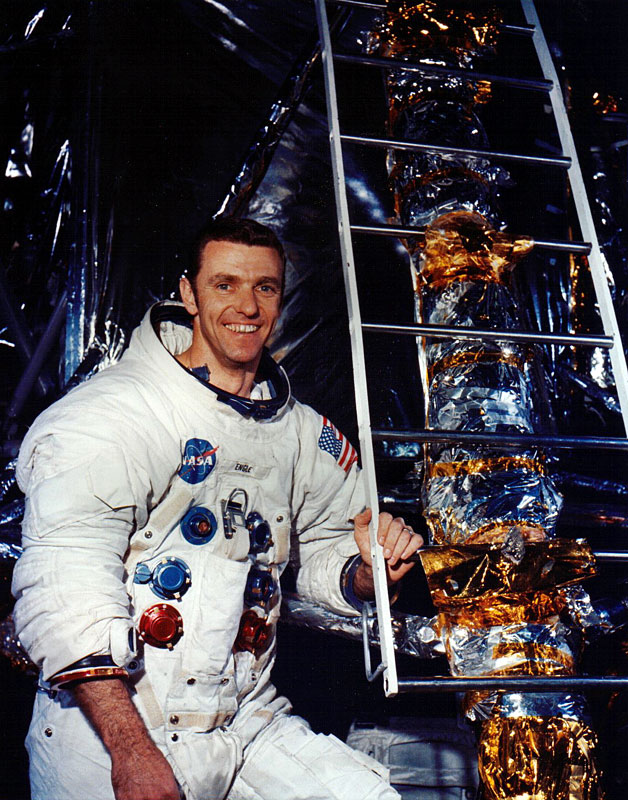
Joe Engle as backup Lunar Module Pilot for Apollo 14

- USAF Astronaut Badge (1964)
- Defense Distinguished Service Medal – "for outstanding achievements"
- Air Force Distinguished Service Medal (1985)
- Distinguished Flying Cross, twice (1964 and 1978) – "for outstanding achievements"
- NASA Distinguished Service Medal
- Two NASA Space Flight Medals
- NASA Exceptional Service Medal
- NASA Special Achievement Award
- USAF Outstanding Young Officer of the Year (1964)
- Kansan of the Year (1964)
- U.S. Junior Chamber of Commerce's one of the Ten Outstanding Young Men of America (1964)
- American Institute of Aeronautics and Astronautics (AIAA) Pioneer of Flight Award (1965)
- AIAA Lawrence Sperry Award for Flight Research (1966)
- Iven C. Kincheloe Prize awarded by the Society of Experimental Test Pilots (1977) – for taking part in testing the Space Shuttle Enterprise
- AIAA Haley Space Flight Award (1980)
- Dr. Robert H. Goddard Memorial Trophy
- Robert J. Collier Trophy
- Harmon International Trophy (1981)
- University of Kansas Distinguished Service Citation (1982)
- University of Kansas School of Engineering Distinguished Engineering Service Award (1982)
- General Thomas D. White USAF Space Trophy, 1981
- Aerospace Walk of Honor, Lancaster, California (1992)
- National Aviation Hall of Fame, Dayton, Ohio (2001)
- U.S. Astronaut Hall of Fame, Florida (2001)
- Award of Air Force Space and Missile Pioneers (2007)
- International Air & Space Hall of Fame (2014)

== See also ==
- The Astronaut Monument

== Bibliography ==
- Thompson, Milton O. (1992). At the Edge of Space: The X-15 Flight Program. Washington, D.C. and London: Smithsonian Institution Press. ISBN 1-56098-107-5. OCLC 24010699.
