= Benefield Anechoic Facility =

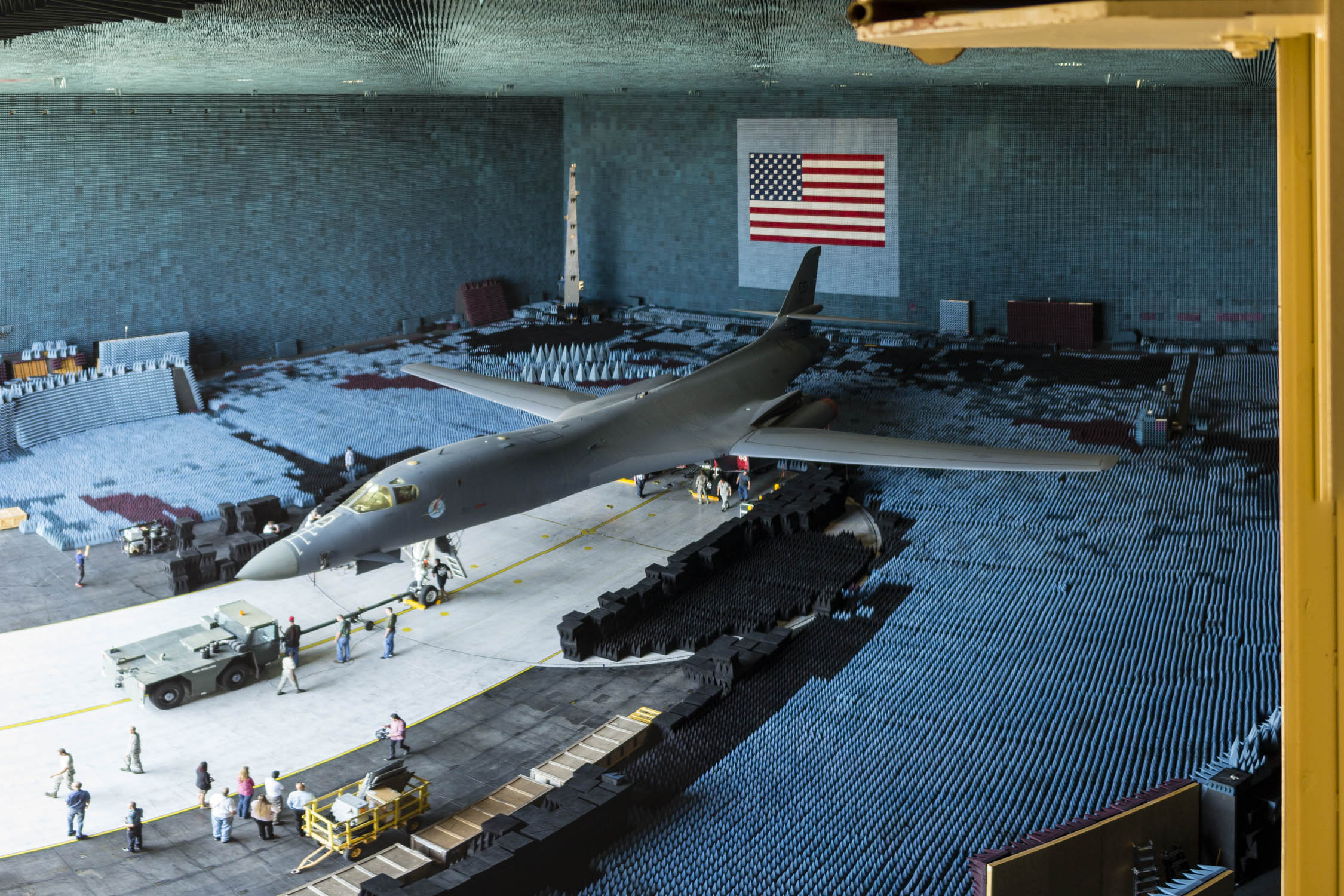
B-1B in the BAF, 2016.

Benefield Anechoic Facility (BAF) is an anechoic chamber located at the southwest side of the Edwards Air Force Base main base. It is currently the world's largest anechoic chamber. The BAF supports installed systems testing for avionics test programs requiring a large, shielded chamber with radio frequency (RF) absorption capability that simulates free space.

The facility is named after Rockwell test pilot and flight commander Tommie Douglas "Doug" Benefield, who was killed in a crash 22 miles (35 km) northeast of Edwards Air Force Base in the desert east of Boron on August 29, 1984 during a USAF B-1 Lancer flight test.

== Purpose ==
The BAF is a ground test facility to investigate and evaluate anomalies associated with Electronic Warfare systems, avionics, tactical missiles and their host platforms. Tactical-sized, single or multiple, or large vehicles can be operated in a controlled electromagnetic (EM) environment with emitters on and sensors stimulated while RF signals are recorded and analyzed. The largest platforms tested at the BAF have been the B-52 and C-17 aircraft. The BAF supports testing of other types of systems such as spacecraft, tanks, satellites, air defense systems, drones and armored vehicles.

The BAF equipment generates RF signals with a wide variety of characteristics, simulating red/blue/gray (unfriendly/friendly/unknown) surface-based, sea-based, and airborne systems. With the combination of signals and control functions available, a wide variety of test conditions can be emulated. Many conditions that are not available on outdoor ranges can be easily generated from the aspect of signal density, pulse density and number of simultaneous types.

Through the use of environmental monitoring systems, an independent agency captures, records, and verifies RF generated signals. These systems have the capabilities for real-time and post-test RF signal parameter measurement, instrument display recording, data analysis and test coordination, as well as providing the data for signal verification.

Some aircraft tested at the BAF include:

- F-22 Raptor
- C-130 Hercules
- NC-130H
- F-16 Fighting Falcon
- B-1 Lancer
- X-43A
- MH-47 Chinook
- V-22 Osprey
- KC-46A Tanker
- F-15SG Eagle
- F-15SA Saudi Advanced Eagle

== Special use ==
In 2003, BMW tested levels of electromagnetic interference on then-upcoming 2004 models of the 530i, 545i and debut model, 645i.
