= General Collins =

General Collins may refer to:

- Arthur S. Collins Jr. (1915–1984), U.S. Army lieutenant general
- Charles Collins (British Army officer) (fl. 1990s–2020s), British Army major general
- Harry J. Collins (1895–1963), U.S. Army major general
- J. Lawton Collins (1896–1987), U.S. Army general
- James Francis Collins (1905–1989), U.S. Army general
- James Lawton Collins (1882–1963), U.S. Army major general
- James Lawton Collins Jr. (1917–2002), U.S. Army brigadier general
- John A. Collins (chaplain) (1931–2003), U.S. Air Force major general
- Michael Collins (astronaut) (1930–2021), U.S. Air Force major general
- Michael Collins (Irish leader) (1890–1922), Irish National Army general
- Robert Collins (British Army officer) (1880–1950), British Army major general
- William R. Collins (1913–1991), U.S. Marine Corps major general

== See also ==
- Geoffrey Collin (1921–2009), British Army major general
- Jean Christophe Collin (1754–1806), First French Empire general of cavalry
- Charles H. T. Collis (1838–1902), Union Army brevet brigadier general
