= Maudit =

Maudit may refer to:

- Mont Maudit, mountain in the French Alps
- Easton Maudit, village in Northamptonshire, England
- Maldit or Maudit, genre of troubadours' songs that complained about a lady's behavior and character
- Israel Mauduit (1708–1787), British merchant, wrote Considerations On The Present German War
- William Maudit, 8th Earl of Warwick (1220–1267), English nobleman, participant in the Barons' War

== See also ==
- Mauduit (disambiguation), surname
- maudit in the Wiktionary
