= Mauduit =

Mauduit is a surname. Notable people with the surname include:

- William Mauduit, 8th Earl of Warwick (1220–1267), English nobleman, participant in the Barons' War
- Jacques Mauduit (1557–1627), French composer
- Israel Mauduit (1708–1787), British merchant, wrote Considerations On The Present German War
- Jasper Mauduit, agent of the Province of Massachusetts Bay 1762—1765
- Ronald Mauduit (1895–1928), British World War I flying ace
- Chantal Mauduit (1964–1998), French mountaineer
- Georges, Vicomte de Mauduit (1893–1945), French airman and author
