= William B. Kean =

United States Army general

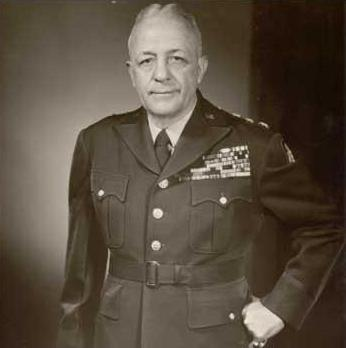
- Born: July 9, 1897; Buffalo, New York, US
- Died: March 10, 1981 (aged 83); Winter Park, Florida, US
- Military career
- Allegiance: United States
- Branch: United States Army
- Service years: 1918–1954
- Rank: Lieutenant General
- Commands: 5th Infantry Division; 25th Infantry Division; III Corps; Fifth United States Army
- Conflicts: World War I World War II; Korean War
- Awards: Distinguished Service Medal; Silver Star; Legion of Merit; Bronze Star
- Other work: Executive Director, Chicago Housing Authority; Public Relations Director, Morton Plant Hospital

William Benjamin Kean (July 9, 1897 – March 10, 1981) was a general in the United States Army.

== Early life ==
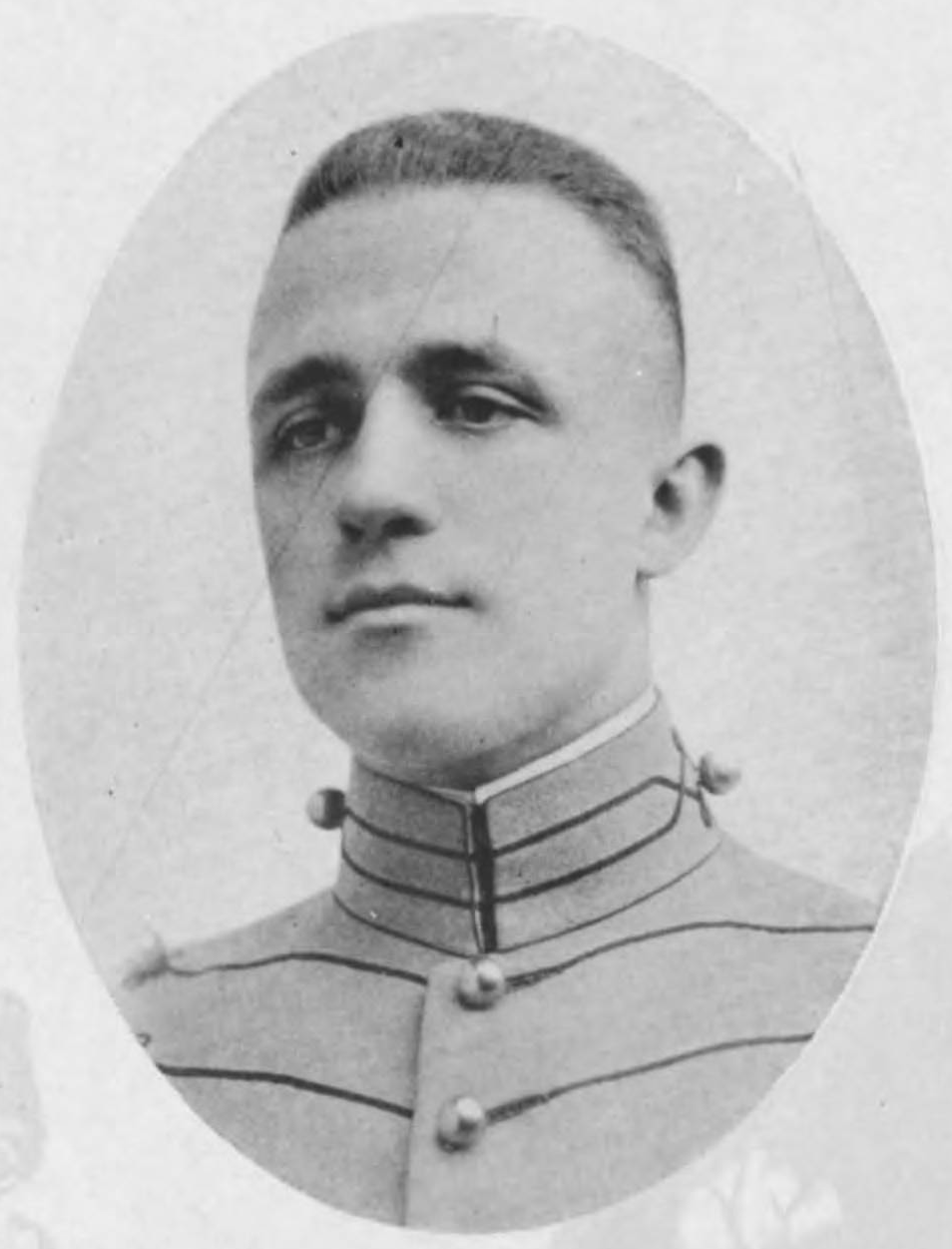
As a West Point cadet

He was born William Benjamin Kean Jr. in Buffalo, New York, on July 9, 1897. Kean graduated from the United States Military Academy in 1918 and was commissioned as a Second Lieutenant of infantry.

== World War I ==
After receiving his commission, Kean was assigned to the U.S.M.A. as a student officer. He then carried out an observation tour of battlefronts in Italy, Belgium and France, and was an observer of the Allied occupation in Germany. In late 1919 he returned to the United States and completed the Infantry Officer Course at Fort Benning, Georgia.

== Inter-war period ==
Kean carried out numerous assignments of increasing rank and responsibility, including a posting to Schofield Barracks, Hawaii. In 1925 he graduated from the Signal Officer Course, and in 1939 he was a graduate of the Command and General Staff College.

== World War II ==
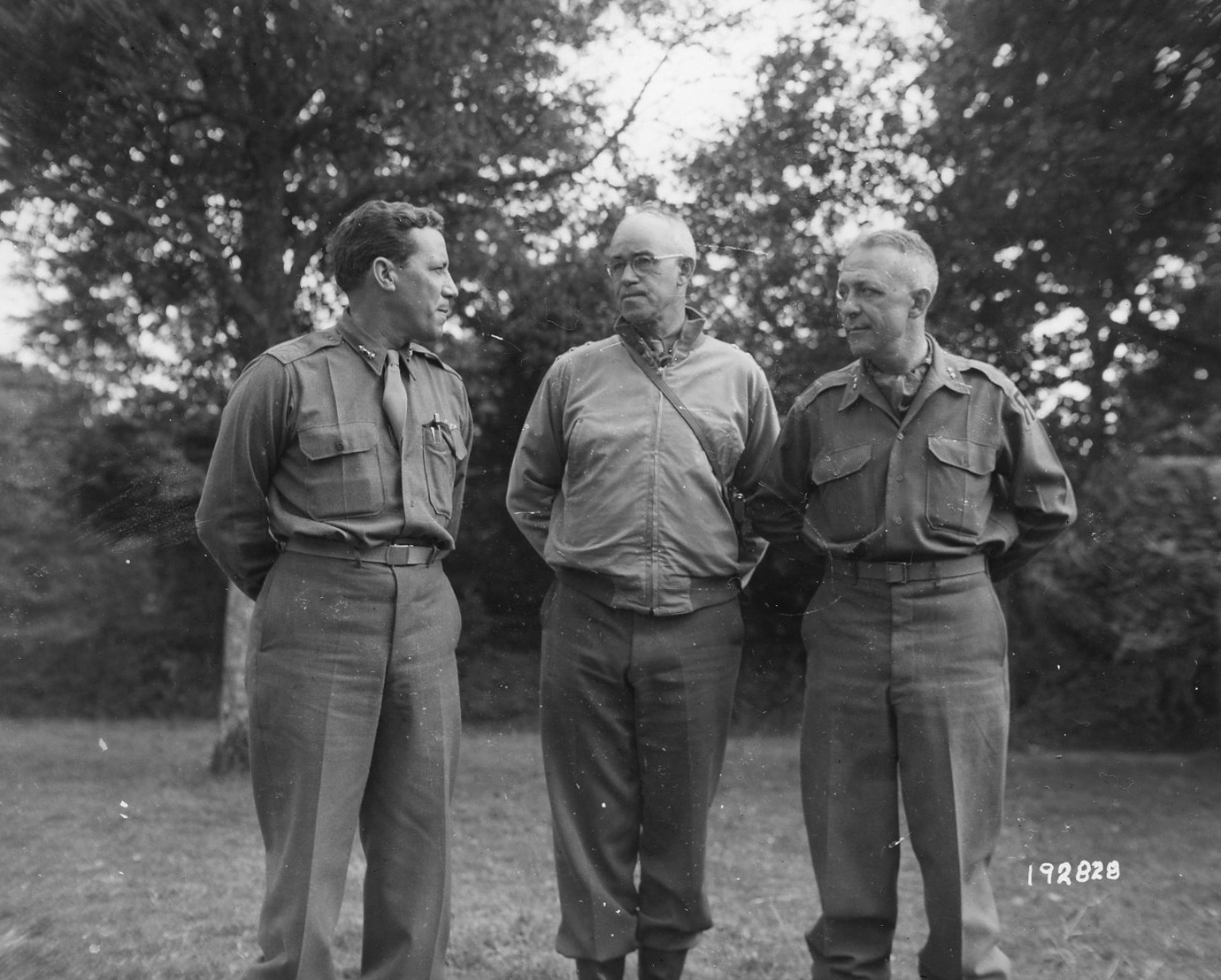
Lieutenant General Omar Bradley, center, Commanding the U.S. 12th Army Group, confers with Major General Elwood Richard Quesada, left, and Major General William B. Kean at 1st U.S. Army Headquarters, 3 miles east of Le Tilleul, France.

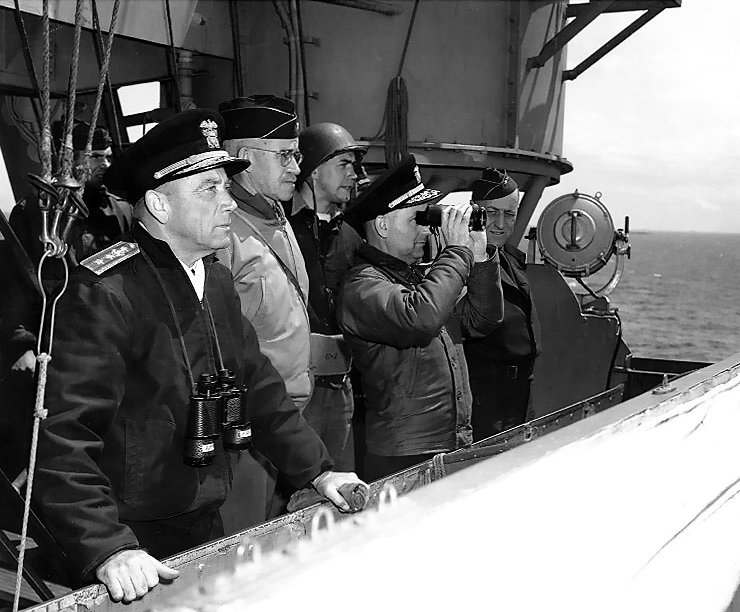
Senior officers watching operations from the bridge of USS Augusta, off Normandy, June 8, 1944. They are (from left to right): Rear Admiral Alan G. Kirk, Lieutenant General Omar Bradley, Rear Admiral Arthur D. Struble (with binoculars), and Major General William B. Kean.

In March, 1943 Kean was assigned as chief of staff of the 28th Infantry Division. Just a month later he was promoted to brigadier general and assigned as chief of staff for the U.S. II Corps, then fighting in North Africa under the command of Omar Bradley. In late 1943 he was assigned as chief of staff for the First U.S. Army, commanded by Courtney Hodges, receiving promotion to major general. Kean served in this position until the end of the war, and remained in Europe during the post-war occupation of Germany.

While with II Corps Kean played a role in the incident in which General George S. Patton was accused of slapping a soldier. After Bradley had investigated, he entrusted the only copy of the written report to Kean, who was directed not to show it to anyone without Bradley's permission.

During his assignment with First Army, Kean was one of the key planners of the D-Day invasion of Normandy. The Soviet Union decorated him with the Order of Suvorov Second Class at war's end when First Army linked up with elements of the Red Army on the Elbe River.

== Post-World War II ==
From October 1947 to June 1948 Kean commanded the 5th Infantry Division at Fort Jackson, South Carolina.

== Korean War ==
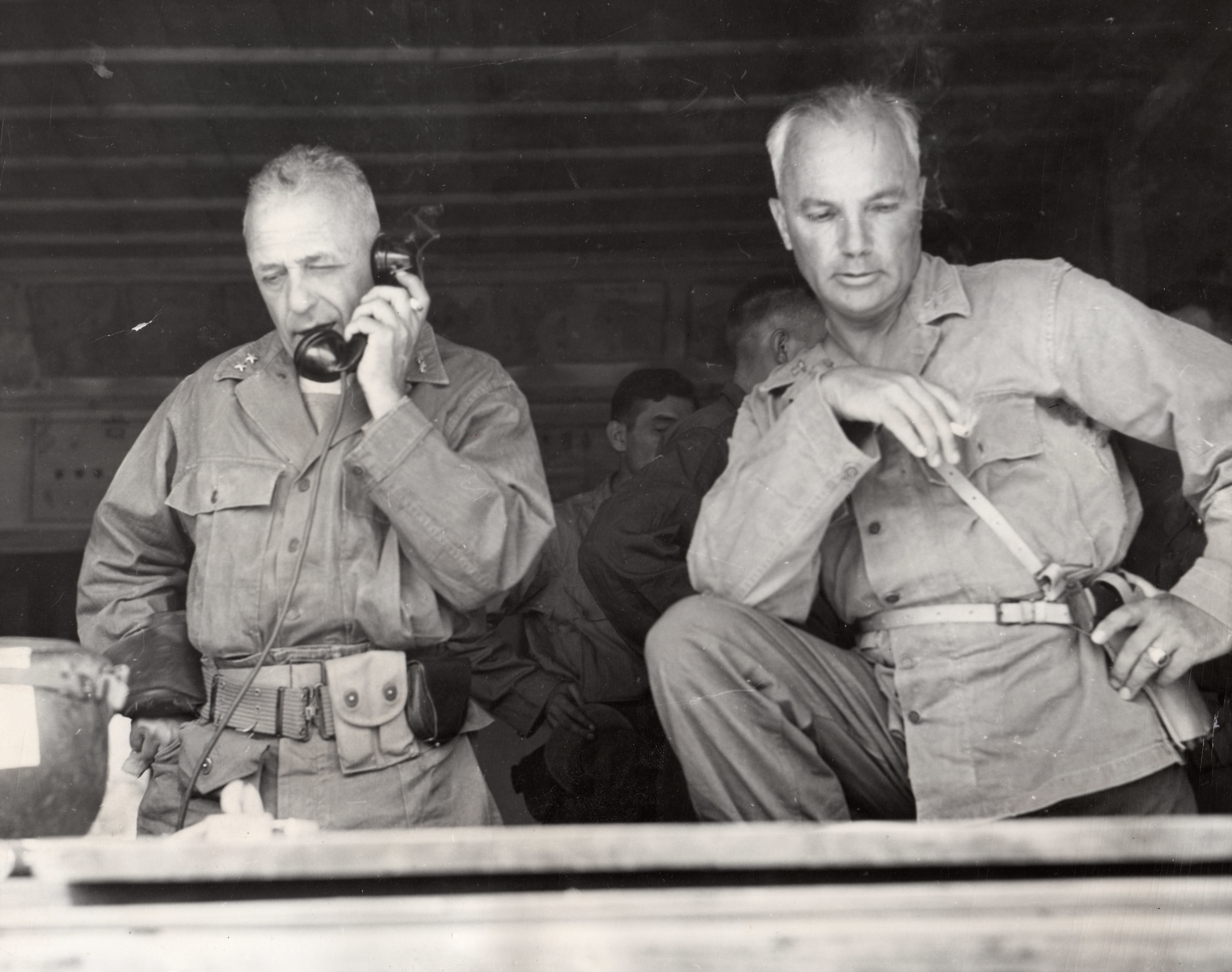
Kean (left) and Col. Henry C. Fisher (right) of the 35th Infantry Regiment c. September 1950

In August 1948 Kean became commander of the 25th Infantry Division. Under his command the division successfully blocked the approaches to the port city Pusan in the summer of 1950, for which it received the Republic of Korea Presidential Unit Citation.

In October 1950 the 25th Division participated in the breakout from the Pusan perimeter and drive into North Korea. In November, Chinese Communist troops crossed the Yalu River and pushed back the United Nations troops. Kean's division carried out a systematic withdrawal and took up defensive positions, first on the south bank of the Chongchon River, and then south of Osan.

After planning and reorganization a new offensive was launched in January 1951. By February Inchon and Kimpo Air Base had been recaptured, the first of several successful assaults on the Chinese/North Korean force that helped turn the tide in the United Nations' favor.

Later in 1951 the 25th Division participated in Operation Ripper, driving the enemy across the Han River. Although the 25th Division, for the most part, performed well under Kean's leadership, Lt. Gen. Matthew Ridgway, who had recently assumed command of the Eighth Army, relieved him as part of an overall 'shakeup' of the Army's frontline generals.

In Korea, Kean assessed the all-black 24th Infantry Regiment, one of his subordinate commands, as being ineffective during its early combat operations, primarily due to the tendency of many soldiers to 'cut and run' during battle. Although he readily admitted that many individual soldiers had demonstrated competency and courage, he felt the regiment was so ineffective that it threatened the entire United Nations effort in Korea. Kean recommended that the 24th Regiment be disbanded and its soldiers assigned as 'fillers' in white units at a ratio of one to ten.

Gen. Ridgway had embraced Kean's assessment of the 24th Infantry Regiment. After relieving Kean, he asked him, before leaving Korea, to officially propose the elimination of the black units and propose the complete integration of white and black troops. Kean complied with his request and Ridgway used that proposal to help win Washington's approval for the complete desegregation of the entire Far Eastern Command.

== Post-Korean War ==
In 1951 Kean was assigned to command the III Corps, first at Camp Roberts, California, and later at Fort MacArthur in San Pedro. In October of that year he led a 5,000 man task force as it took part in an exercise at the Nevada Test Site. During this event, atomic weapons tests were conducted to measure the effects on military members in close proximity.

In July 1952 Kean was named commander of Fifth United States Army in Chicago, Illinois, and promoted to lieutenant general. He remained in this assignment until retiring from the Army in 1954.

Kean's decorations included multiple awards of the Distinguished Service Medal, including two during World War II. He also received the Silver Star for heroism in the Korean War. In addition, Kean received multiple awards of the Legion of Merit, and was a recipient of the Bronze Star.

== Subsequent career ==
In October 1954, Kean was appointed executive director of the Chicago Housing Authority. He remained in this position until 1957.

At the C.H.A., Kean was the subject of controversy for his emphasis on reducing vacancy rates over racial integration of the authority's housing projects.

After resigning from the housing authority, he moved to Florida, where he was employed as Public Relations Director for the Morton Plant Hospital in Clearwater.

== Retirement and death ==
After retiring Kean lived in Belleair and Winter Park, Florida. He died in Winter Park on March 10, 1981.

== Sources ==
- Normandy to Victory: the War Diary of General Courtney H. Hodges and the First U.S. Army, by William C. Sylvan and Francis C. Smith, edited by John T. Greenwood, 2008, page 400
- Omaha Beach: D-Day, June 6, 1944, by Joseph Balkoski, 2006, page 142
- "63 Officers Move Up In Rank", The New York Times, p. 11, May 5, 1943 (subscription required)
- Denny, Harold (June 11, 1945). "Narrow Escape on 'the Bulge'". Milwaukee Journal. p. 12 – via Google News Archive.
- Official U.S. Army Register, published by U.S. Army Adjutant General's Office, 1946, Volume 1, page
- War in Peacetime: the History and Lessons of Korea, Joseph Lawton Collins, 1969, page 90
- Letters from a Soldier: 1941-1945, by Jim Larson, 2002, page 286
- The Korean War, by Matthew B. Ridgway, 1967, page 192
- Lightning Forward: a History of the 25th Infantry Division, Melvin C. Walthall, 1978
- Bulletin of the Atomic Scientists, October 1951
- Military Times, Hall of Valor, Index of Recipients of U.S. Major Military Awards
- "Gen. Kean Retires", The New York Times, p. 12, October 1, 1954 (subscription required)
- Making the Second Ghetto: Race and Housing in Chicago, 1940–1960, by Arnold Richard Hirsch, 1983, page 235

Military offices
Preceded by John H. Church	Commanding General 5th Infantry Division; 1947–1948	Succeeded by George Decker
Preceded by Charles L. Mullins Jr.	Commanding General 25th Infantry Division; 1948–1951	Succeeded by Joseph S. Bradley
