= Brazil–United States Treaty =

1952 treaty between Brazil and the United States

The Brazil–United States Treaty was a military assistance agreement signed in 1952 in Rio de Janeiro between the two countries, with the goal of defending the Western Hemisphere.

== Background ==
Military relations between the United States and Brazil date back to World War II, when Brazil supported the Allied effort in the invasion of Italy in 1942. Brazil provided troops for the invasion. On January 3, 1952, The Brazilian government issued decree 30363 establishing new government regulations. These new regulations allowed for the return of foreign capital that was invested in Brazil and profit remittances on that capital. Shortly after, representatives from the United States and representatives from Brazil started to negotiate a bilateral military assistance agreement in Rio de Janeiro on January 3, 1952. The document outlining the agreement between the two countries would be signed on March 15, 1952. The agreement went into effect on May 19, 1952. During the time of the negotiations, Major General Charles L. Mullins Jr. negotiated a separate military plan with the Brazilian Government. The plan was approved on March 14, 1952, by the Secretary of Defense Robert A. Lovett. In a private ceremony on March 15, 1952, United States Major General Mullins and Brazilian General Monteiro signed the military plan that outlined a common defense between the two nations. The agreement allowed major weapons and training by the United States military to the Brazilian military.

This tenuous alliance governed the two nations bilateral ties during the events of the Cold War. However, the alliance was short lived, and suffered several major blows between the two nations during the military coup in Brazil in 1964. During this time the United States still provided military support and training to the side that supported the United States.

== Military coup ==
The United States were willing to go to any means necessary to support the military coup, to prevent Brazil from becoming a communist state. President Johnson said "I think we ought to take every step that we can, be prepared to do everything that we need to do." to keep Brazil from becoming a communist country. President Goulart, Brazil's president, supported labor unions, wanted to limit the international business profits from Brazil, and also wanted to begin trading with communist states. The military coup would eventually win, leading to a twenty-year military dictatorship.

== See also ==
- Inter-American Treaty of Reciprocal Assistance
