= Charles L. Mullins Jr. =

American Army general (1892–1976)

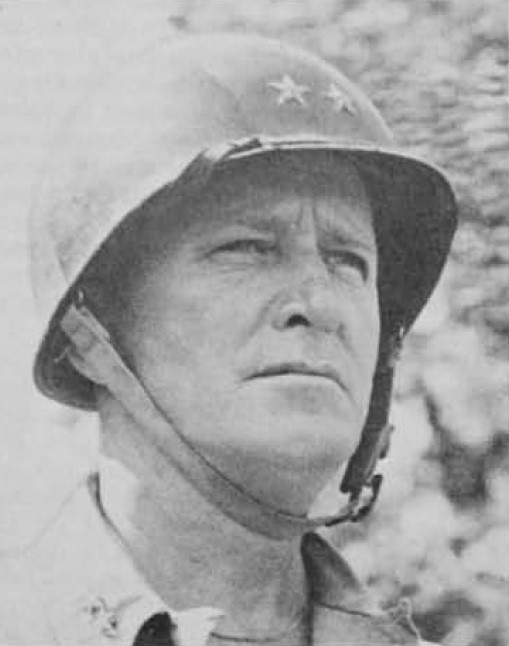
- Nicknames: Moon, Bud
- Born: 7 September 1892; Gretna, Nebraska
- Died: 1 March 1976 (aged 83) Palo Alto, California
- Allegiance: United States
- Branch: United States Army
- Service years: 1917–1953
- Rank: Major General
- Commands: 25th Infantry Division; Academia Militar de Nicaragua; 1st Battalion, 12th Infantry
- Conflicts: World War I; World War II
- Awards: Distinguished Service Medal; Silver Star Medal; Bronze Star Medal; Air Medal

Charles Love Mullins Jr. (7 September 1892 – 1 March 1976) was a United States Army major general. During World War II, he commanded the 25th Infantry Division on Luzon in 1945 during the Philippines campaign. Before the war, he helped establish the Academia Militar de Nicaragua and served as its first director.

== Early life and education ==
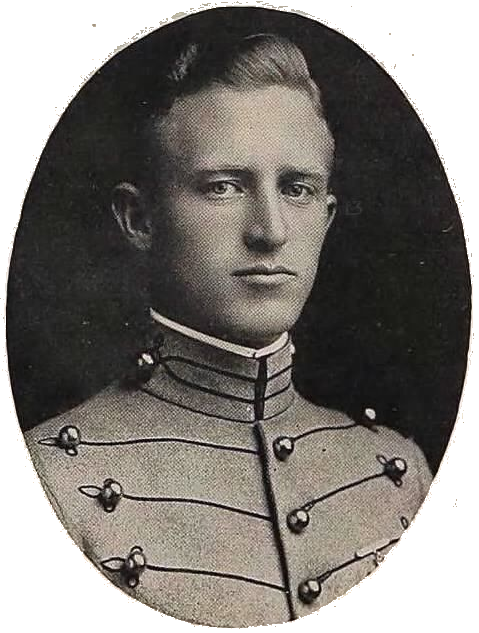
Mullins as a cadet at West Point, 1917

Mullins was born in September 1892 in Gretna, Nebraska and graduated from Broken Bow High School in 1910. He entered the United States Military Academy (USMA) at West Point, New York in June 1913, graduating, 105th out of 139, in April 1917, shortly after the American entry into World War I, with a commission in the infantry. Mullins graduated from the Infantry School Company Officer Course in May 1925 and Advanced Course in June 1930. He graduated from the Air Corps Tactical School in 1932, the Command and General Staff School in 1934 and the Army War College in 1939. Mullins also attended the Air Corps Primary Flying School from March to May 1927 and received an air observer rating.

== Military career ==
After commissioning, Mullins was assigned to the 12th Infantry Regiment. During World War I, he served as a temporary captain from August 1917 to August 1918 and temporary major from August 1918 to June 1920 but was never sent overseas during the war, which ended in November 1918. Mullins then taught military science and tactics at the University of Illinois as an assistant professor from May to November 1919. He was then given command of the 1st Battalion, 12th Infantry at Camp Meade, Maryland from December 1919 to June 1920.

Reduced in rank to captain, Mullins served as a company commander from July 1920 to January 1921 in California and Hawaii. He then became an aide-de-camp to Major General Charles G. Morton until August 1921, before serving on the headquarters staff of the Hawaiian Department from August 1921 to June 1924. Returning to the mainland, he taught tactics at West Point from July 1925 to February 1927.

In May 1927, Mullins was reassigned to the 25th Infantry Regiment in Arizona. He was promoted to major in January 1933. Mullins joined the 29th Infantry in September 1934 as executive officer of the 1st Battalion until June 1935 and then adjutant of the regiment until February 1936.

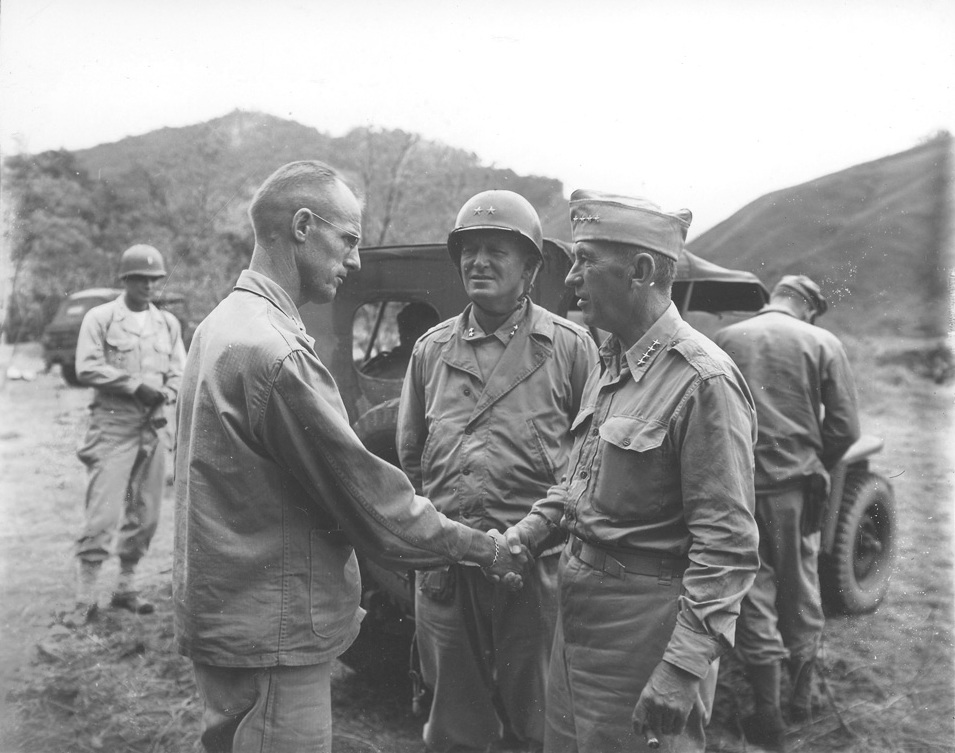
Colonel James Dalton II (left) shakes hands with General Walter Krueger, commanding the Sixth Army, on Luzon, March/April 1945. In the center is Major General Charles L. Mullins Jr., the 25th Division's commander.

After Nicaraguan President Anastasio Somoza asked American President Franklin D. Roosevelt for aid in establishing a military school modeled on the U.S. Military Academy, Mullins was assigned to the American Military Mission to Nicaragua in 1939. In August 1939, he became director of the new Academia Militar de Nicaragua and was made a colonel in the Nicaraguan National Guard. Mullins was promoted to lieutenant colonel in the U.S. Army in July 1940 and then received a temporary promotion to colonel in January 1941. He was promoted to brigadier general in the Nicaraguan National Guard in February 1941.

Mullins returned to the United States in early 1942, shortly after America's entrance into World War II, and received a temporary promotion to brigadier general in July 1942. In August 1942, Mullins became combat commander for the 11th Armored Division at Camp Polk, Louisiana and Camp Barkeley, Texas.

In December 1943, he was reassigned to the 25th Infantry Division in the Pacific theatre. Mullins assumed command from Major General J. Lawton Collins, a fellow West Point classmate, and received a temporary promotion to major general in February 1944. After its 1943 combat operations, the division was re-equipped and retrained in New Zealand and New Caledonia before joining the fight for Luzon in January 1945. Mullins received the Army Distinguished Service Medal, Silver Star Medal, Bronze Star Medal and Air Medal for his actions while serving as commanding general (CG) of the 25th Division.

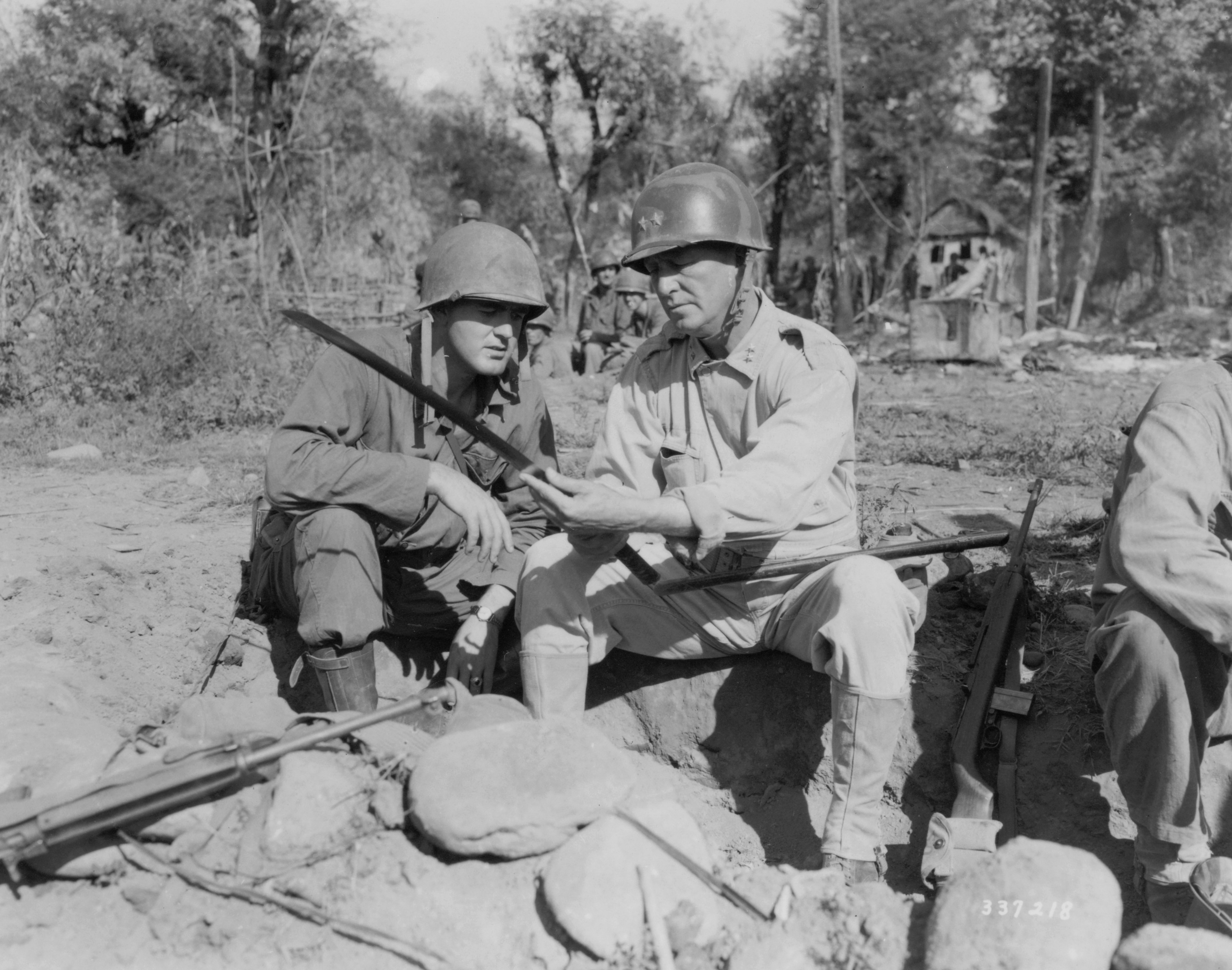
Major General Mullins, commanding the 25th Infantry Division, points out the meaning of the insignia on a captured Japanese officer's saber to Lt. Col. V. L. Johnson, at the front in San Manuel, Luzon, January 1945.

After the war, Mullins remained in command of the division during the military occupation of Japan until May 1948, when he relinquished command to Brigadier General Everett E. Brown. His wartime promotion to major general had been made permanent in January 1948. Mullins next served as deputy commander of the Second Army at Fort Meade (formerly Camp Meade), Maryland from August 1948 to October 1949. He then served as chairman of the American delegation to the Joint Brazil–United States Military Commission for three years. He retired from active duty on 31 January 1953.

== Other honors ==
Mullins received the Medalla Militar al Mérito Presidencial primera clase from Nicaragua. A Nicaraguan airmail postage stamp commemorating the twentieth anniversary of the Academia Militar de Nicaragua in 1959 depicting General Mullins, President Somoza and President Roosevelt was issued in January 1961.

Mullins was also an honorary graduate of the Escuela Superior de Guerra de Brasil.

== Family and later life ==
In 1933, Mullins met and married Jane Dooley (29 January 1894 – 16 February 1997). They had one daughter.

After his retirement, Mullins and his wife settled in Nogales, Arizona. In 1961, they moved to San Francisco, California. He died in Palo Alto, Santa Clara County, California and was buried at Arlington National Cemetery.

== See also ==
- Brazil–United States Treaty

Military offices
Preceded by J. Lawton Collins	Commanding General 25th Infantry Division; 1943–1948	Succeeded by William B. Keannext permanent commander
