= Georges, Vicomte de Mauduit =

- Born: Georges Marie de Mauduit de Kervern; 28 July 1893; Villeblevin, France
- Died: 2 February 1945 (aged 51); Dachau concentration camp, Germany
- Occupations: Airman, Engineer, Writer
- Spouse: Priscilla Griffin
- Writing career
- Notable works: The Vicomte in the Kitchen; They Can't Ration These

Georges de Mauduit de Kervern, Vicomte de Mauduit (1893 – 1945), was a French pilot, engineer and author.

== Life and works ==
Georges de Mauduit was the son of Commandant the Count de Mauduit de Kervern of the French Fourth Army, Chief of Staff and a cavalry officer. He was a great-grandson of General de Mauduit, an officer who accompanied Napoleon to St Helena.

Educated in England, he trained as an engineer. He served in the French Air Force during the First World War, and was severely injured. He spent time working on irrigation projects in Egypt, and travelling in Britain, France, and North America.

In 1932, Mauduit wrote Private Views: Reminiscences of a Wandering Nobleman which the Times Literary Supplement described as "a lively and fascinating book in which the author introduces you to all the famous people he has met", filled with "charming pen pictures." The book recounts his experiences in these countries and the many well-known people he met, including his aviation training under Louis Blériot and his encounter with Colonel Roosevelt in New York. Also in the book, Mauduit describes his life as an engineer in Paris during the First World War and his work on the first tanks through participation in a technical committee.

Mauduit also wrote a selection of cookery books as well as a book described by the Sydney Morning Herald as a "pleasant nursery story" entitled Mimie and Shah.

His series of "original and valuable" cookery books began with The Vicomte in the Kitchen (1933). This first book was followed by The Vicomte in the Kitchenette (1934) and The Kitchen Companion (1939).

1940 saw the publication of They Can’t Ration These, a cookery book responding to the outbreak of the Second World War instructing the reader on how to use ingredients sourced from the English countryside, described by the Times Literary Supplement "to the country dweller with time and a spirit of adventure the book will be a delight." In his preface to the text, David Lloyd George described the book as "a valuable contribution towards our national defence".

== Final years and death ==
Information surrounding Mauduit's movements after 1940 is unclear. A 1941 article in the Chicago Tribune records that Mauduit had been tried in England on a charge of "making statements 'likely to cause alarm or despondency'". He was found guilty and sentenced to two months of imprisonment.

In December 1942 and January 1943, a series of articles by Mauduit appeared in various European newspapers. In these pieces, Mauduit describes his disillusionment with the Free French Government. He refers to his imprisonment at the hands of the British and cites the poor treatment of French volunteers arriving in London. In January 1943, he addressed Radio-Paris, with a talk on the same theme.

His movements and activities after 1943 are not known. However, records from Dachau Concentration camp record the arrival of "Georges de Manduit" on 20 June 1944, and his death on 2 February 1945.

His death was announced in The Times in late 1945. An initial notice published on 22 November describes him as the "brother of Mlle Evelyn de Mauduit". The notice was republished two weeks later, with the correction that he was the father of Evelyn, rather than her brother.

== Family ==
In January 1916, Mauduit married Priscilla Alden Griffin, of 500 Madison Avenue, New York City, the eldest daughter of the late General Eugene Griffin. They had at least two daughters.

Yolande, born on 27 November 1916, in Paris, in 1943 married the future US Army Brigadier General James Lawton Collins Jr. brother of NASA astronaut Michael Collins. She died on 12 June 2012, in Williamsburg, Virginia.

Evelyn-Maud Genevieve de Mauduit was born on 17 April 1921 in Paris and died on 16 March 2010 in Paimpol, Cotes-d'Armor.

In 1974, Mauduit's widow was living in Connecticut Avenue, Washington, D.C.
