= Jasper Mauduit =

Jasper Mauduit was an agent in London of the Province of Massachusetts Bay, and a successor of William Bollan, who served as agent from 1746 to 1762. Jasper Mauduit's agency was terminated in 1765. He was the brother of Israel Mauduit.

== Historical context ==
Jasper Mauduit was an agent during the time of the reign of George III. At the time, the Province of Massachusetts was governed by the Charter of William and Mary. This charter had been in effect since 1691, when the New England Colonies of Massachusetts Bay and New Plymouth were joined with the province of Maine and Nova Scotia, forming the Massachusetts Bay Colony.

== Colonial agencies in England ==
While colonial agencies existed in the seventeenth century, they were temporary and mostly concerned with affairs of great importance, when affairs in the colony seemed to call for a greater level of communication with the British government. An agent was needed in Massachusetts particularly for the purpose of protecting the charter. Often, these agents were prominent persons from the colonies that were sent to England to be representatives at court. Once their mission was accomplished, however, their agencies came to an end. As colonial management developed in the 18th century, agencies became a permanent representation, rather than a temporary special embassy.

== Literature ==
- Bollan, William, Jasper Mauduit, and Charles G. Washburn. 1918. Jasper Mauduit, agent in London for the Province of the Massachusetts-Bay, 1762-1765. Boston: Massachusetts Historical Society.
