= James Lawton Collins =

U.S. Army general (1882–1963)

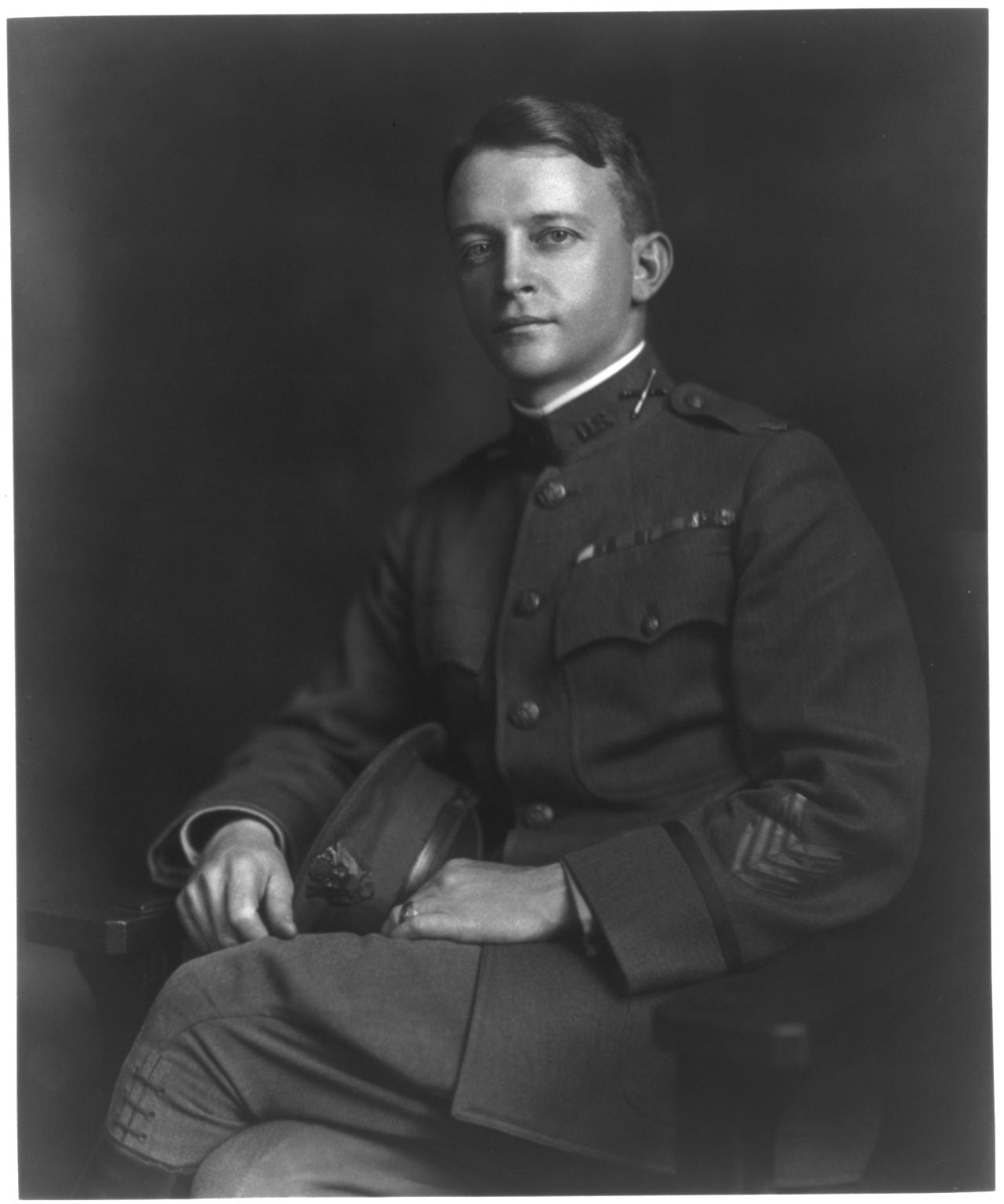
- Born: December 10, 1882; Algiers, Louisiana, US
- Died: June 30, 1963 (aged 80); Washington, D.C., US
- Burial place: Arlington National Cemetery
- Relatives: Joseph Lawton Collins (brother); James Lawton Collins Jr. (son); Michael Collins (son); Kate Collins (granddaughter)
- Military career
- Allegiance: United States
- Branch: United States Army
- Service years: 1907–1946
- Rank: Major General
- Service number: 0-2274
- Conflicts: Philippine–American War; World War I World War II
- Awards: Army Distinguished Service Medal (2); Silver Star; Philippine Campaign Medal

James Lawton Collins (December 10, 1882 – June 30, 1963) was an American major general of the U.S. Army who served in World War I and World War II, and was the father of Apollo 11 astronaut Maj. Gen. Michael Collins, USAF Reserve (ret.), and Brigadier General James Lawton Collins Jr. His brother, General J. Lawton Collins, served as Army Chief of Staff during the Korean War.

== Biography ==
=== Family and early life ===
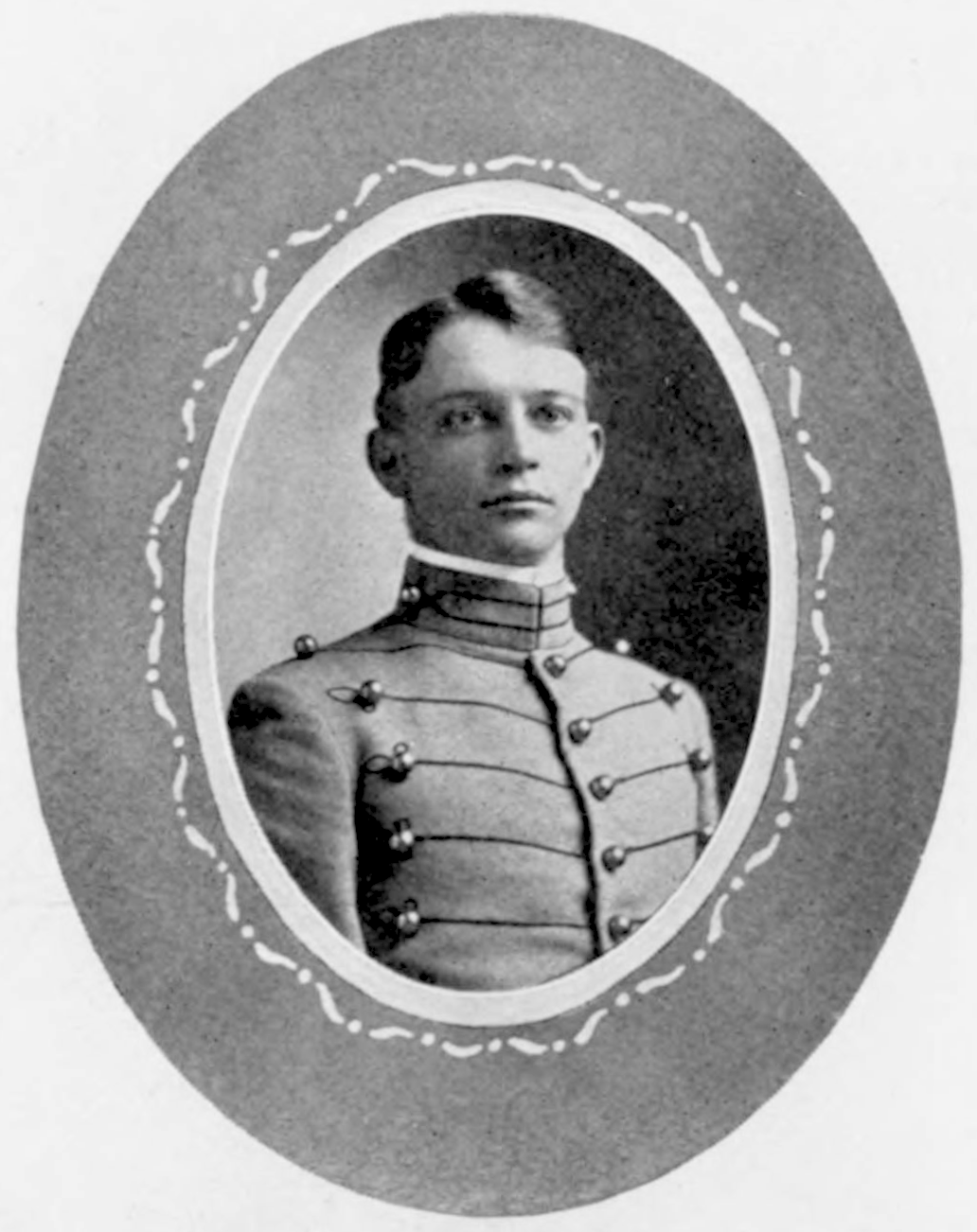
At West Point in 1907

Collins was born into a large Irish Catholic family in Algiers, Louisiana, across the Mississippi River from New Orleans. His father, Jeremiah Bernard Collins, had left Dunmanway, County Cork in Ireland as a young boy in the early 1860s to join the rest of the family in Cincinnati, Ohio. Family legend has it he served as a drummer boy in the Civil War and, at age 16, helped to drive a herd of horses into Texas to replace the cavalry mounts which had been lost to the war. He made his way to New Orleans, where he worked for James Lawton, a grocer.

Jeremiah worked his way up to running the stables for the delivery wagons, and eventually married Kate Lawton, his employer's daughter. They moved across the river to Algiers, near the terminus and rail repair shops of the Southern Pacific Railroad, which employed many workers of Irish descent. There, they established a dry goods store, with a pub in the back. Jeremiah and Kate's eleven children would work there, serving beer and food to railroad men. Their first-born son was named for Kate's father, James Lawton Collins.

James was not tall, about 5 ft 6 in (168 cm), but he was agile, athletic, and good with horses. Later in life, he would come to the attention of Gen. John J. Pershing for his aggressive and successful polo playing, and as an excellent judge of horses. A letter in the Library of Congress in the Pershing correspondence asks James to go to the remount station in the Shenandoah Valley to pick a new horse for the general to ride.

He had told his son that his first flight occurred in 1911 in the Philippines, perched on the wing of a Wright plane, with Frank Lahm flying the machine. He said that they flew over a forest fire and the updraft nearly knocked him off the plane.

=== Military career ===
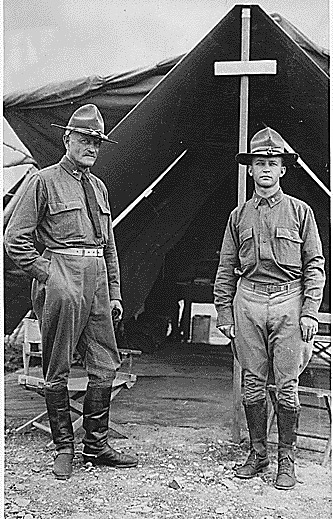
Lieutenant Collins (right) with Major General Pershing in Mexico, 1916

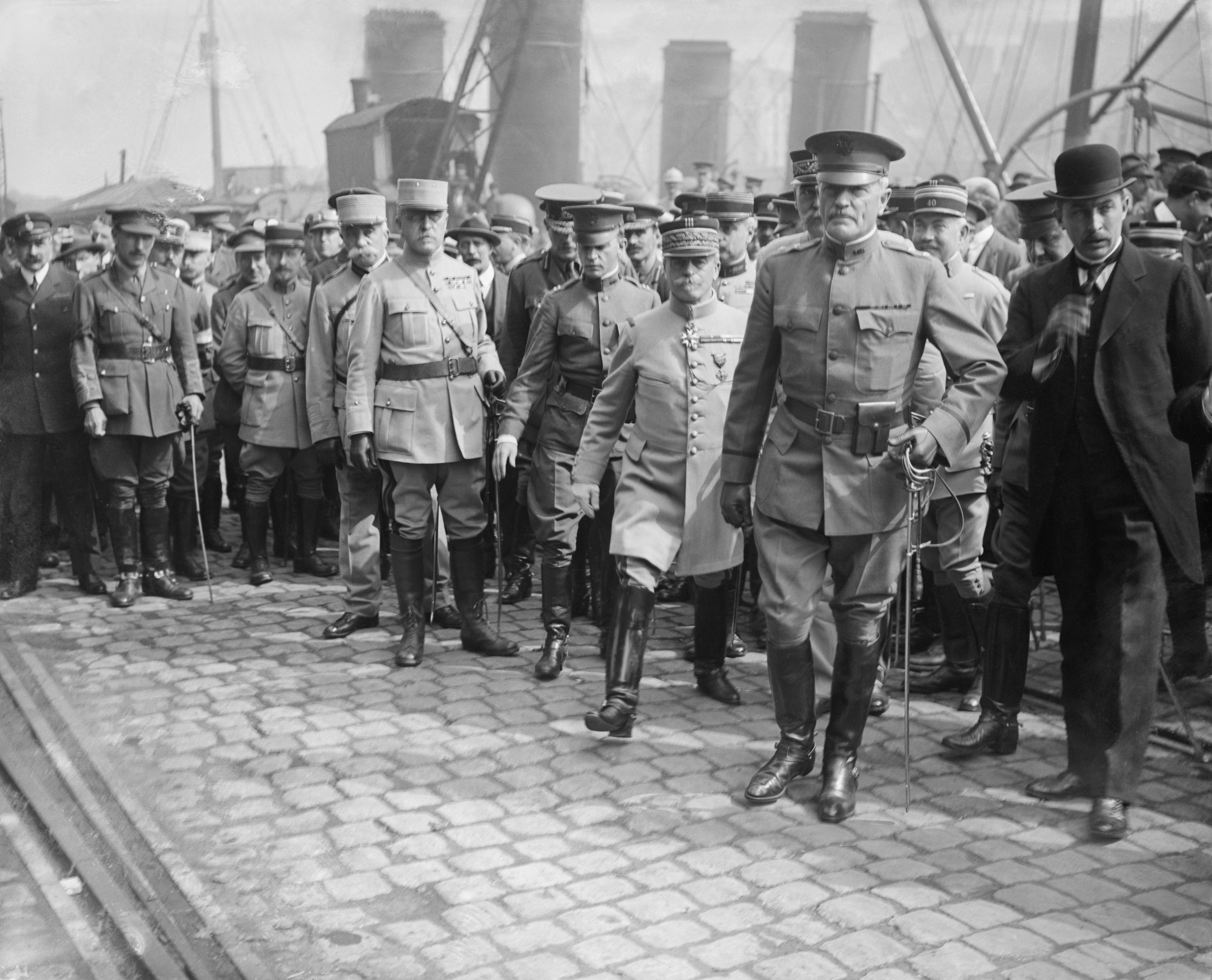
The newly appointed Commander-in-Chief (C-in-C) of the American Expeditionary Forces (AEF), Major General John J. Pershing, landing off the boat at Boulogne, France, 13 June 1917. Stood two away from him is his aide, Major James L. Collins.

Collins enrolled in Tulane University, but his mother's uncle, the mayor of New Orleans, was asked by a local member of Congress if there was a bright young man who could "stay the course" at West Point. Collins, reached at Tulane, accepted the appointment.

During the Philippine–American War, Collins served in the 8th Cavalry and as an aide-de-camp to Pershing in the Philippines. He also served with Pershing during the Mexican Punitive Expedition and in France during World War I.

During the war Collins commanded a battalion of the 1st Division's 7th Field Artillery. For his service during the war he was awarded the Army Distinguished Service Medal, with the medal's citation stating:

The President of the United States of America, authorized by Act of Congress, July 9, 1918, takes pleasure in presenting the Army Distinguished Service Medal to Lieutenant Colonel (Field Artillery) James Lawton Collins (ASN: 0-2274), United States Army, for exceptionally meritorious and distinguished services to the Government of the United States, in a duty of great responsibility during World War I. As aide-de-camp to the Commander in Chief, as line officer on duty with troops, and as Secretary of the General Staff of the American Expeditionary Forces, Lieutenant Colonel Collins displayed a thorough knowledge of every duty with which he was entrusted. With tireless energy, keen perception, and able execution of his manifold duties he rendered especially meritorious services to the American Expeditionary Forces.

Later he served as Defense Attaché to the Kingdom of Italy in Rome from 1928 to 1932.

During World War II he commanded the Puerto Rico Department and the 5th Service Command at Columbus, Ohio.

Collins retired as a major general in 1946. Upon his death he was buried at Arlington National Cemetery in Arlington, Virginia.

== Sources ==
- Barnes, Bart (May 12, 2002). "James Collins Jr., 84; General, Military Historian". Los Angeles Times. "His father, Maj. Gen. James Lawton Collins, was an aide de camp to Gen. John J. Pershing, who commanded the American Expeditionary Forces during World War I."
- Collins, Michael (2009). Carrying the Fire: An Astronaut's Journeys. Lindbergh, Charles (foreword). Cooper Square Press. ISBN 9780374531942.
- Ancell, R. Manning; Miller, Christine (1996). The Biographical Dictionary of World War II Generals and Flag Officers: The US Armed Forces. Westport, Connecticut: Greenwood Press. ISBN 0-313-29546-8. OCLC 33862161.
- Venzon, Anne Cipriano (2013). The United States in the First World War: an Encyclopedia. Hoboken, NJ: Taylor and Francis. ISBN 978-1-135-68453-2. OCLC 865332376.

Military offices
Preceded by Walter Krueger	Commanding General 2nd Infantry Division; 1940–1941	Succeeded by Edmund L. Daley
