= J. Lawton Collins =

United States Army general (1896–1987)

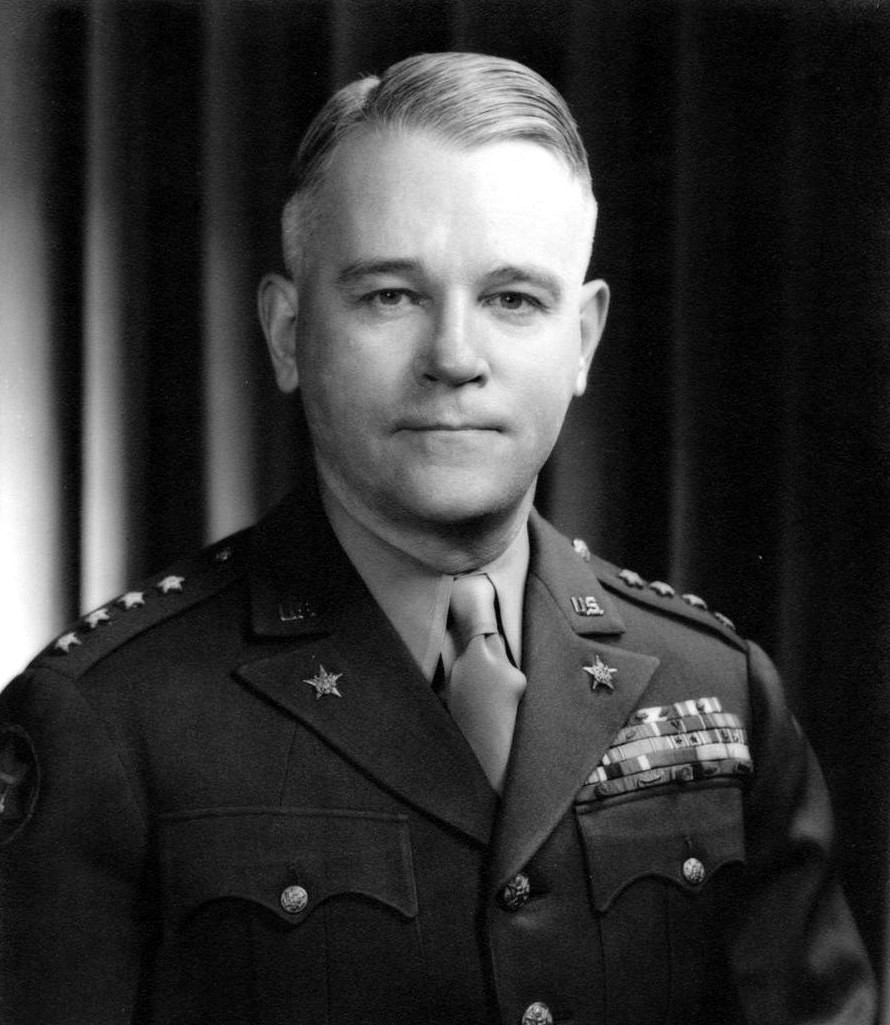
- Collins in 1948
- Born: Joseph Lawton Collins; 1 May 1896; New Orleans, Louisiana, U.S.
- Died: 12 September 1987 (aged 91); Washington, D.C., U.S.
- Burial place: Arlington National Cemetery
- Spouse: Gladys Easterbrook (m. 1921)
- Relatives: James Lawton Collins (brother); James Lawton Collins Jr. (nephew); Michael Collins (nephew)
- Military career
- Allegiance: United States
- Branch: United States Army
- Service years: 1917–1956
- Rank: General
- Nickname: "Lightning Joe"
- Service number: O-5247
- Unit: Infantry Branch
- Commands: Chief of Staff of the United States Army; Vice Chief of Staff of the United States Army; Deputy Chief of Staff of the United States Army; VII Corps; 25th Infantry Division; 3rd Battalion, 18th Infantry Regiment; 3rd Battalion, 22nd Infantry Regiment
- Conflicts: See battles: World War I; Occupation of the Rhineland; World War II; Solomon Islands Campaign; Guadalcanal campaign; New Georgia Campaign; Operation Overlord; Normandy landings; Operation Goodwood; Operation Cobra; Falaise Pocket; Siegfried Line campaign; Battle of the Mons Pocket; Battle of Hürtgen Forest; Battle of the Bulge; Western Allied invasion of Germany; Korean War
- Awards: Army Distinguished Service Medal (4); Silver Star (2); Legion of Merit (3); Bronze Star Medal

Joseph Lawton Collins (1 May 1896 – 12 September 1987) was a senior United States Army officer. During World War II, he served in both the Pacific and European Theaters of Operations, one of a few senior American commanders to do so. He was Chief of Staff of the United States Army during the Korean War.

Collins' elder brother, Major General James Lawton Collins, was also in the United States Army. His nephew, Brigadier General James Lawton Collins Jr. served in World War II, the Korean War and the Vietnam War. Another nephew, Michael Collins, was the command module pilot on the Apollo 11 mission in 1969 that put the first two men on the Moon and retired from the United States Air Force as a major general.

== Early life and military career ==
Joseph Lawton Collins was born in New Orleans, Louisiana, on 1 May 1896, the tenth of eleven children (five boys, six girls) of the large Irish Catholic family of New Orleans dry goods store and pub owner Jeremiah Bernard Collins and Catherine (Lawton) Collins. He attended the Catholic schools of Algiers and graduated from Boys High School in New Orleans in 1912.

Collins attended Louisiana State University and competed for a congressional appointment to the United States Military Academy (USMA) at West Point, New York. Selected as an alternate by Representative H. Garland Dupré, Collins received the appointment after the first choice failed to qualify. He followed in the footsteps of his older brother James Lawton Collins, who graduated in 1907. He attended from 14 June 1913 to April 1917, with his class graduating early because of the American entry into World War I. He graduated 35th of 139, and was commissioned shortly before his twenty-first birthday.

Commissioned as a second lieutenant in the 22nd Infantry, Collins was assigned as a platoon and later company commander. He was promoted to first lieutenant 15 May 1917, and temporary captain on 5 August. He attended the United States Army Infantry School of Arms at Fort Sill, Oklahoma, and served with the regiment at various locations between 1917 and 1919. He was promoted to captain in June 1918, and to temporary major in September, and took command of the 3rd Battalion, 22nd Infantry Regiment the following month. World War I came to an end soon afterwards, on 11 November 1918. Unable to fight overseas during the war, Collins commanded the 3rd Battalion, 18th Infantry Regiment in France in June 1919, and was assistant chief of staff, as a G-3 staff officer with the American Forces in Germany from 1920 to 1921. During this time, Collins served in the Army of Occupation in Germany.

== Between the wars ==
Collins reverted to the rank of captain on 10 March 1919. He married Gladys Easterbrook, a daughter of Protestant Army chaplain Edmund P. Easterbrook, in Coblenz on 15 July 1921, and had one son named Joseph Easterbrook 'Jerry' Collins on 12 August 1924 (West Point graduate of 1946). Collins was instructor in the department of chemistry at the USMA from 26 August 1921 to 18 June 1925. He graduated from the company officer course at the United States Army Infantry School at Fort Benning, Georgia in 1926, and from the advanced course at the United States Army Field Artillery School at Fort Sill, Oklahoma the year after. He was an instructor in weapons and tactics at the United States Army Infantry School from 1927 to 1931. It was during this time where he first encountered George C. Marshall, the future U.S. Army Chief of Staff, who was to play a significant role in Collins's future military career. Promoted to major in August 1932, he was executive officer of the 23rd Brigade in Manila, and assistant chief of staff, as a G-2 staff officer, with the Philippine Division from 6 August 1933 to 8 May 1934.

Collins graduated from the United States Army Industrial College in 1937, and the United States Army War College the following year. He was then an instructor at the Army War College from 1938 to 1940. He was promoted to lieutenant colonel on 25 June 1940 and, now a full colonel (having been promoted on 15 January 1941), was chief of staff of VII Corps in 1941.

== World War II ==
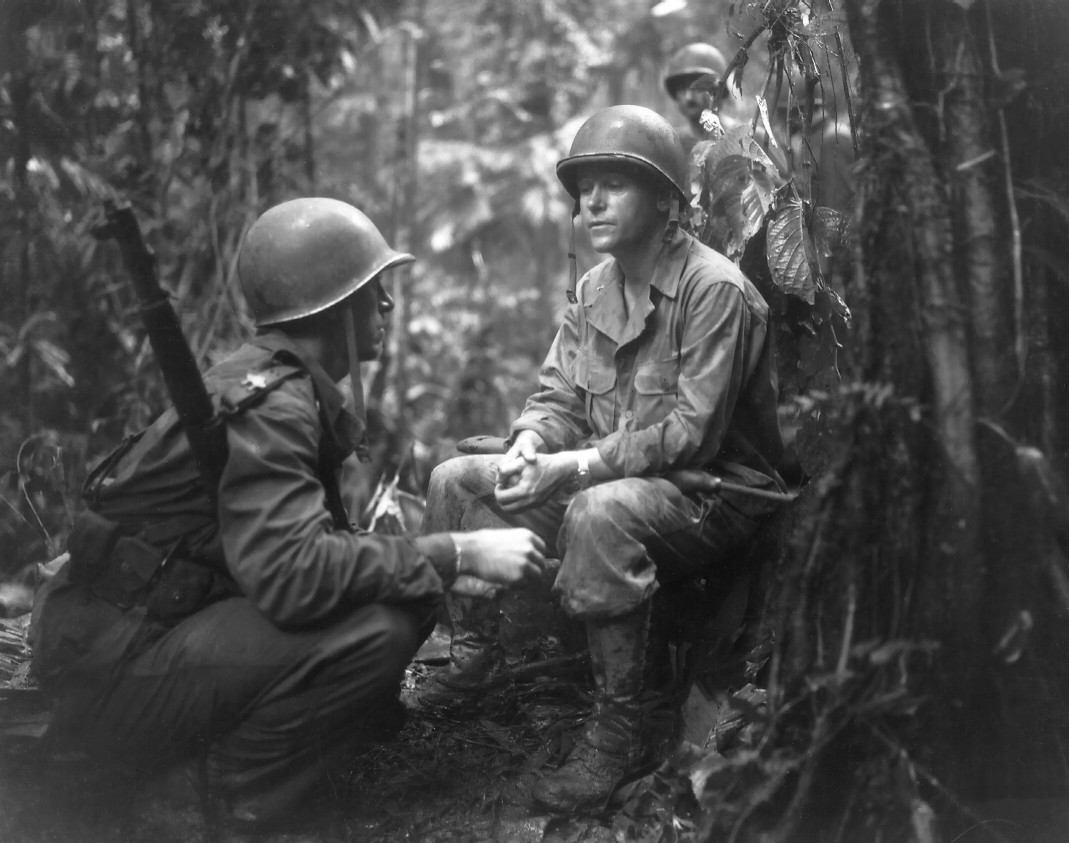
On the right, Major General J. L. Collins, commanding the 25th Division and, on the left, Major Charles W. Davis, commanding the 3rd Battalion, 27th Infantry Regiment confer on New Georgia, 14 August 1943

By the time the United States entered World War II in December 1941, Collins had been a temporary colonel since January. He was promoted to the one-star general officer rank of brigadier general on 14 February 1942, and the two-star general officer rank of major general on 26 May.

=== Pacific theater ===
Collins was chief of staff of the Hawaiian Department from 1941 to 1942 and served as the Commanding General of the 25th Infantry Division—nicknamed the "Tropic Lightning" Division—on Oahu and in operations against the Japanese on Guadalcanal between 1942 and 1943 and on New Georgia from July to October 1943. He was awarded Distinguished Service Medal for his service with the Hawaiian Department. At the time of his appointment on 6 May 1942 he was the youngest division commander in the United States Army, aged 46. To serve as his assistant division commander, Collins specifically selected Brigadier General John R. Hodge, a decision he never came to regret as Hodge, who later became a full general, proved himself to be up to Collins's high standards.

It was during the campaign in Guadalcanal that Collins gained his nickname of "Lightning Joe", for his dash and aggression. It was also during this campaign that saw Collins awarded with the Distinguished Service Medal, Legion of Merit and the Silver Star, the citation for which reads:

The President of the United States of America, authorized by Act of Congress 9 July 1918, takes pleasure in presenting the Silver Star to Major General Joseph Lawton Collins (ASN: 0-2274/0-5247), United States Army, for gallantry in action against the enemy while serving as Commanding General, 25th Infantry Division, in action on 11 January 1943 at Guadalcanal, Solomon Islands. To visit the command post of an infantry battalion of the Division commanded by him, General Collins walked through some 800 yards of recently captured ground infested with enemy snipers. Upon arriving on Hill 52, to gain better points of observation, he voluntarily exposed himself to intermittent rifle, machine gun and mortar fire, without regard for his own personal safety. From there, he located an enemy machine gun nest and personally assisted in placing mortar fire on it and on other areas likely to be occupied by the enemy, while bursts of enemy machine gun fire hit many times but three yards away. His calmness and fearlessness under fire was an inspiration to the officers and men of the infantry regiment in that sector. His example and words of praise and encouragement with which he continually encouraged the men in the forward units spurred them on and contributed materially to the success of the offensive operation. His gallant actions and dedicated devotion to duty, without regard for his own life, were in keeping with the highest traditions of military service and reflect great credit upon himself, his unit, and the United States Army.

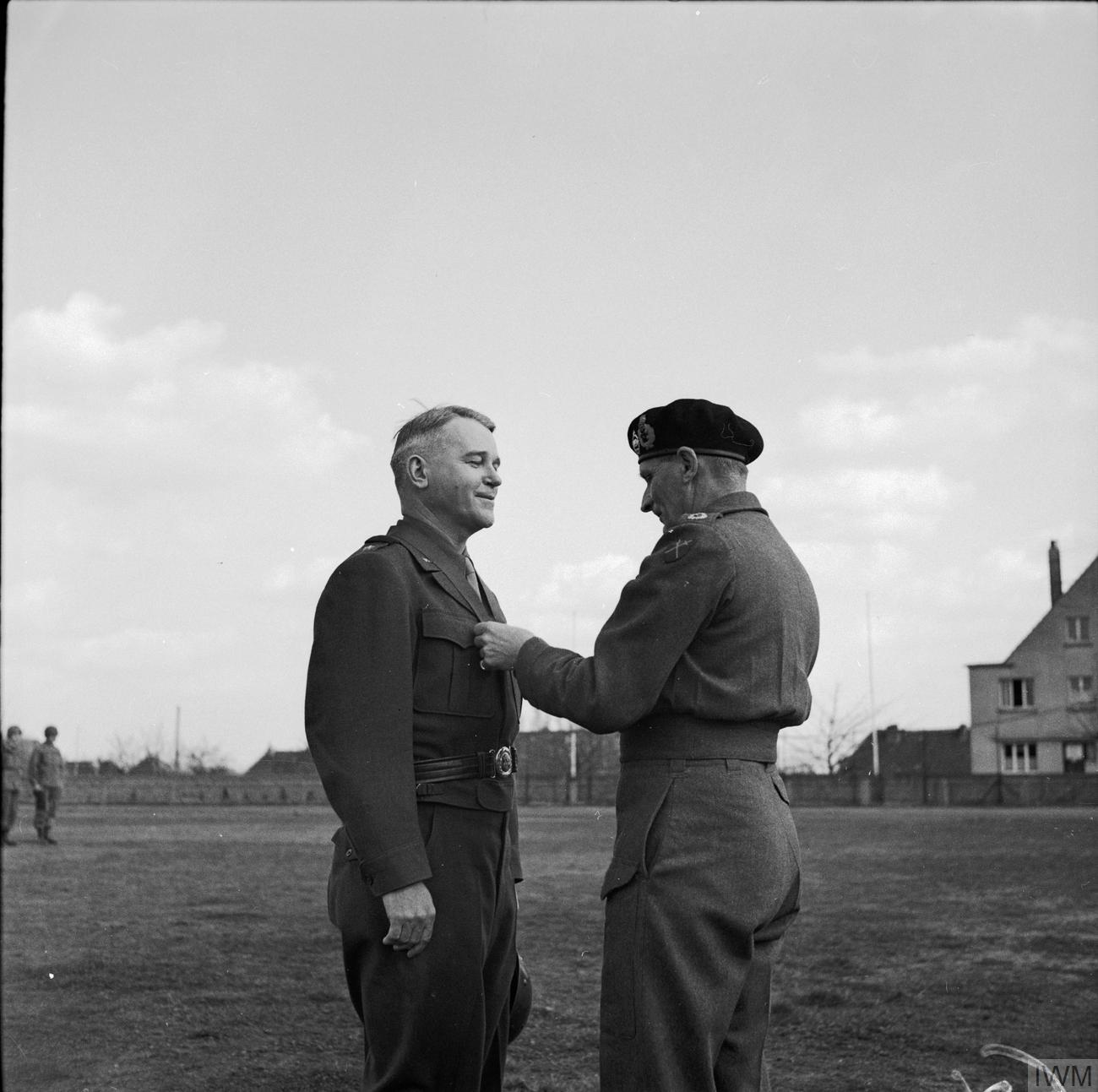
Major General J. Lawton Collins receiving the Companion of the Order of the Bath from British General Sir Bernard Montgomery at Mönchengladbach, 1944

=== Western theater ===
Collins was later transferred to the European Theater of Operations (ETO), where he commanded the VII Corps in the Allied invasion of Normandy and on the Western Front through to the end of World War II in Europe in May 1945.

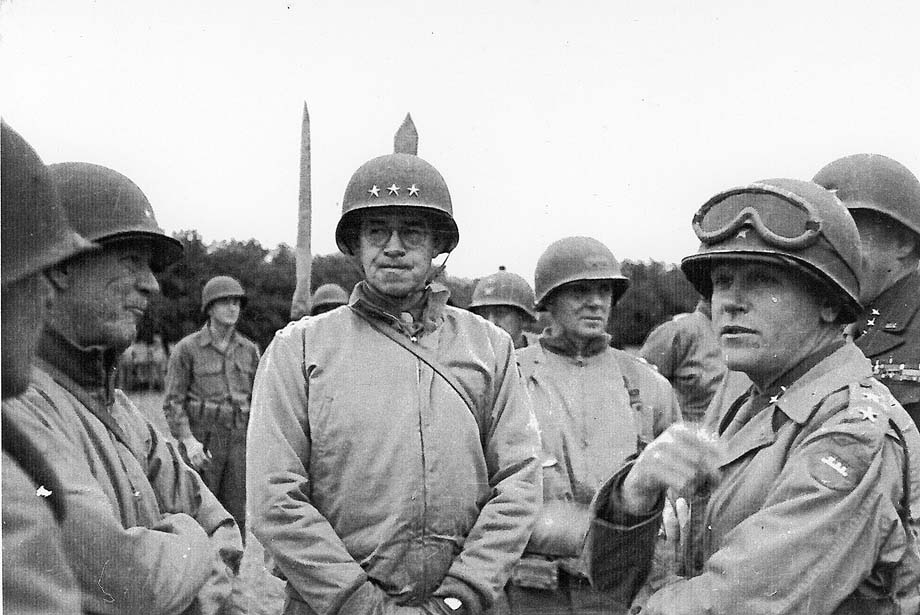
Bradley (center with three stars on his helmet) and Collins, along with other senior officers, attend the funeral of Brigadier General Theodore Roosevelt Jr. in Normandy, France, July 13, 1944. Roosevelt died shortly after D-Day.

Collins was chosen by Lieutenant General Omar Bradley, who had served with Collins at the Army Infantry School before the war and was then commanding the First Army in England, as a replacement for Major General Roscoe B. Woodruff, the original commander of VII Corps and one of Bradley's 1915 West Point classmates. Although senior to Collins he had no experience in amphibious operations or any combat experience at all in this war. Collins was appointed after a brief interview with Bradley and General Dwight D. Eisenhower, the Supreme Allied Commander, about his combat experience after Collins summed up his tactical approach in the Pacific as always targeting the high ground in an attack. Bradley turned to Eisenhower, claiming that Collins "talks our language." At the age of forty-seven, this made Collins the youngest corps commander in the United States Army.

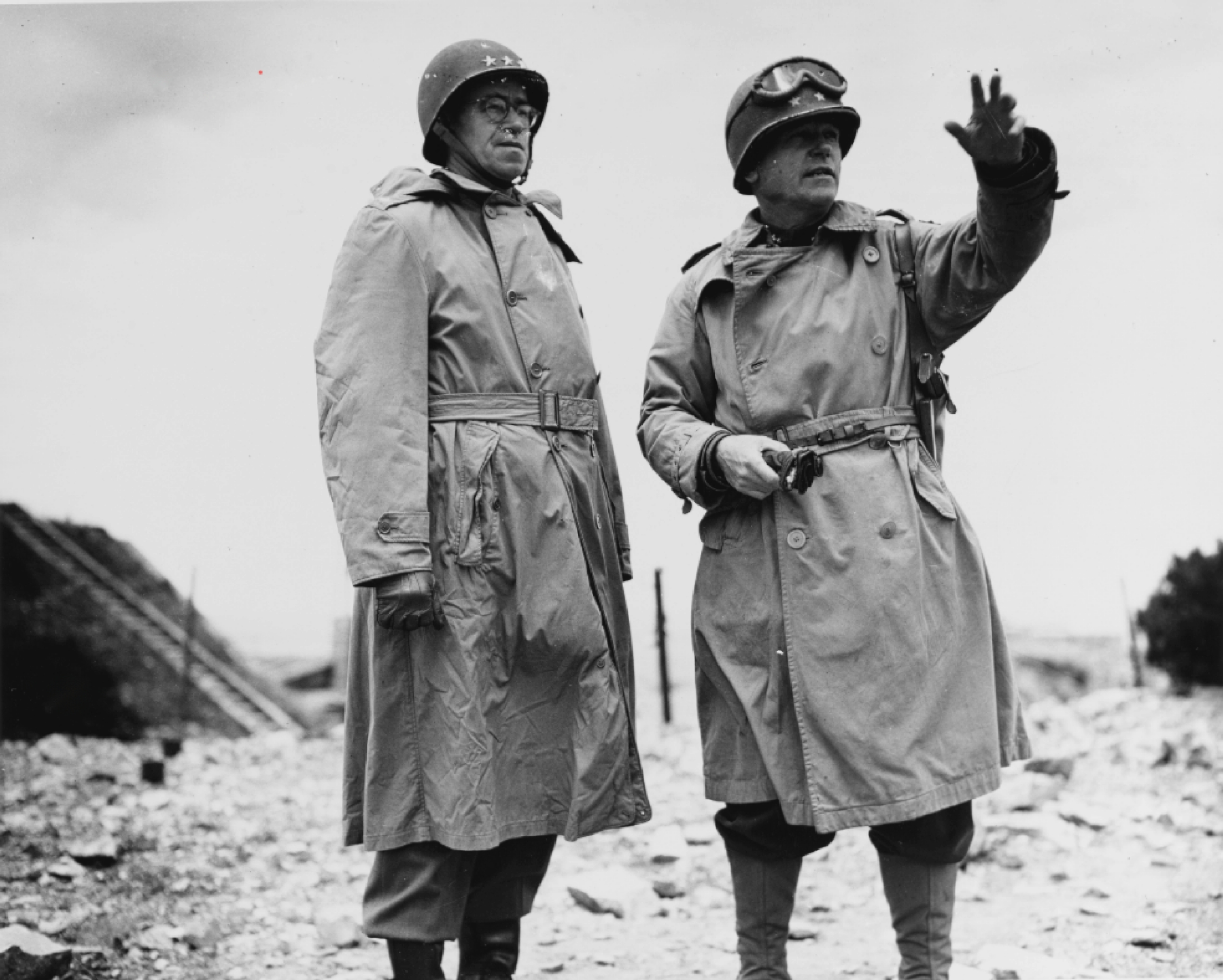
Collins (right) explains to Lieutenant General Bradley (left) how Cherbourg was taken, July 1944.

VII Corps played a major role in the Normandy landings in June 1944 and the subsequent Battle of Normandy, including Operation Cobra. Collins was a favorite of the British 21st Army Group commander, General Sir Bernard Montgomery, who after Operation Goodwood laid the path for VII Corps to break out in Operation Cobra on 27 July 1944. VII Corps is perhaps best known for the leading role it played in Operation Cobra; less well known is Collins' contribution to that plan.

After Cobra was the Battle of the Falaise Pocket, which completed the destruction of the Wehrmacht in Normandy, with the corps then taking part in the liberation of Paris and the Allied advance from Paris to the Rhine.

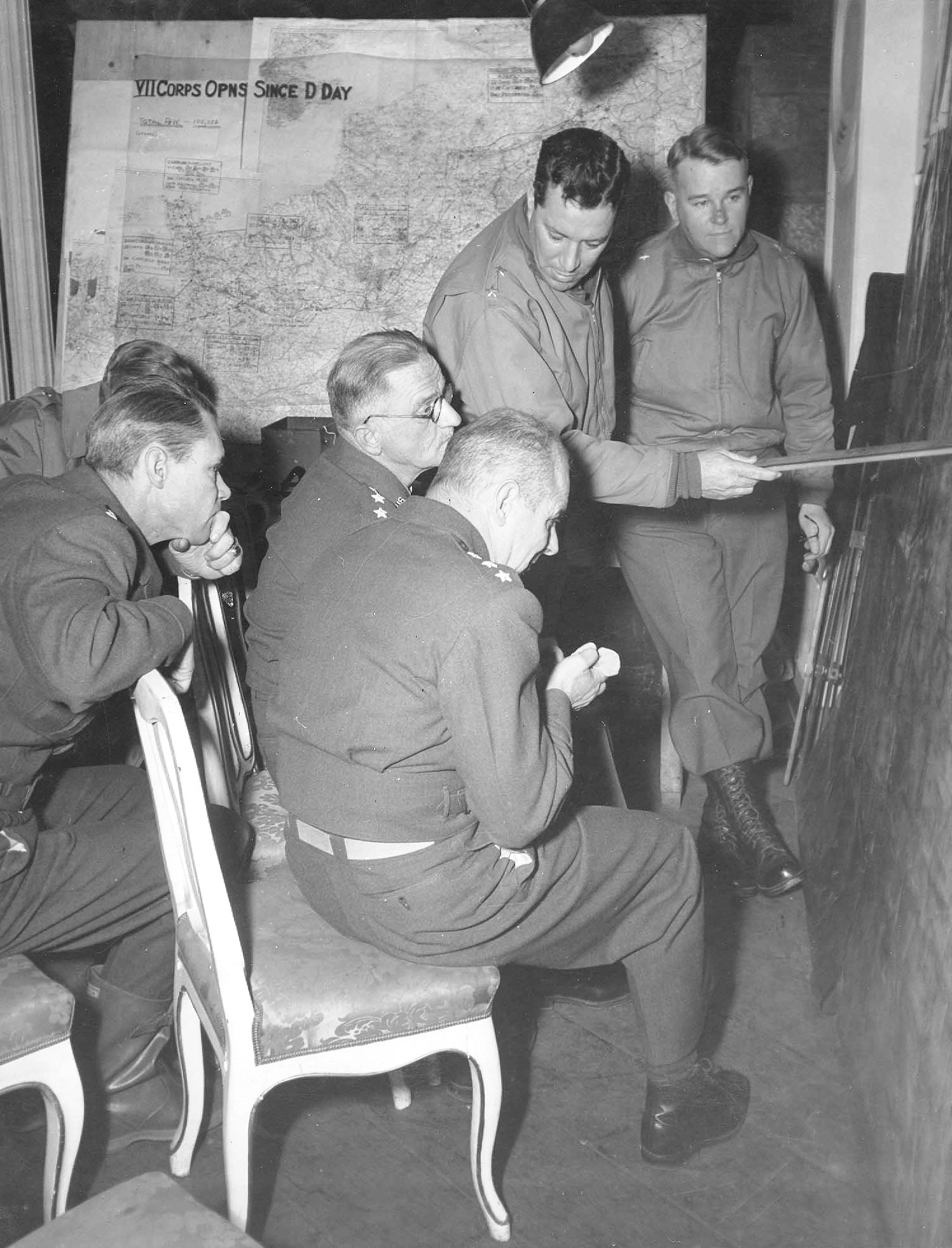
Collins (far right), overseeing an air ground liaison briefing for Lieutenant General Carl Spaatz (glasses) and Lieutenant General James Doolittle (seated), at Collins' corps headquarters. Münsterbusch, Germany, November 19, 1944.

In early September VII Corps took approximately 25,000 prisoners during the Battle of the Mons Pocket. It later broke through the Siegfried Line and endured heavy fighting in the Battle of Hürtgen Forest. VII Corps later played a major role in the Battle of the Bulge, the largest battle on the Western Front during World War II, and finally took part in the Western Allied invasion of Germany.

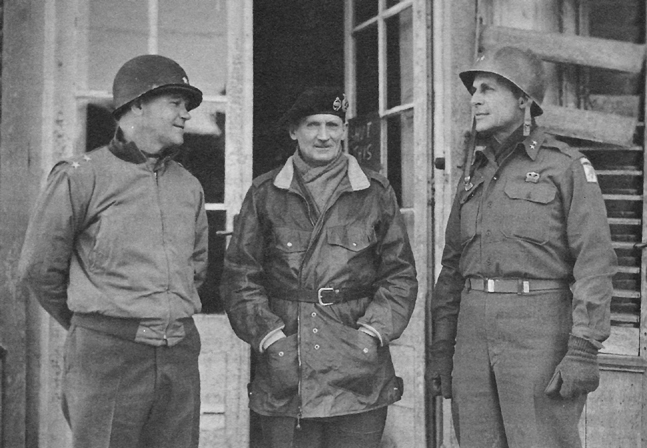
Collins with Field Marshal Sir Bernard Montgomery, commanding the 21st Army Group, and Major General Matthew Ridgway, commanding XVIII Airborne Corps and one of Collins' West Point classmates, December 1944.

One of the few senior American commanders to fight in both Europe and the Pacific, against the Germans and Japanese respectively, Collins contrasted the nature of the enemy in the two theaters of war:

The German was far more skilled than the Japanese. Most of the Japanese that we fought were not skilled men. Not skilled leaders. The German had a professional army... The Japanese.. didn't know how to handle combined arms – the artillery and the support of the infantry – to the same extent we did. They were gallant soldiers, though... They fought very, very hard, but they were not nearly as skillful as the Germans. But the German didn't have the tenacity of the Japanese.

Collins was promoted to the temporary three-star rank of lieutenant general in April 1945 and permanent brigadier general in June. He was very highly regarded by General Omar Bradley, Collins' superior for most of the war, and many senior German commanders believed Collins to be, along with Lieutenant General Troy H. Middleton, commanding the VIII Corps, one of the best American corps commanders on the Western Front. Bradley commented that "Had we created another ETO Army, despite his youth and lack of seniority, Collins certainly would have been named the commander." For his service during the war Collins was three times awarded the Army Distinguished Service Medal, twice awarded the Silver Star and twice the Legion of Merit. Numbering among his foreign awards and decorations, the Soviet Union awarded Collins the Order of Suvorov Second Class twice while serving as Commanding General, VII Corps.

== Postwar ==
After the war, Collins was deputy commanding general and chief of staff of Army Ground Forces from August to December 1945. Later, he was director of information (later chief of public information) of the United States Army from 1945 to 1947. He was deputy, later Vice Chief of Staff of the United States Army from 1947 to 1949 and was promoted to temporary general and permanent major general in January 1948.

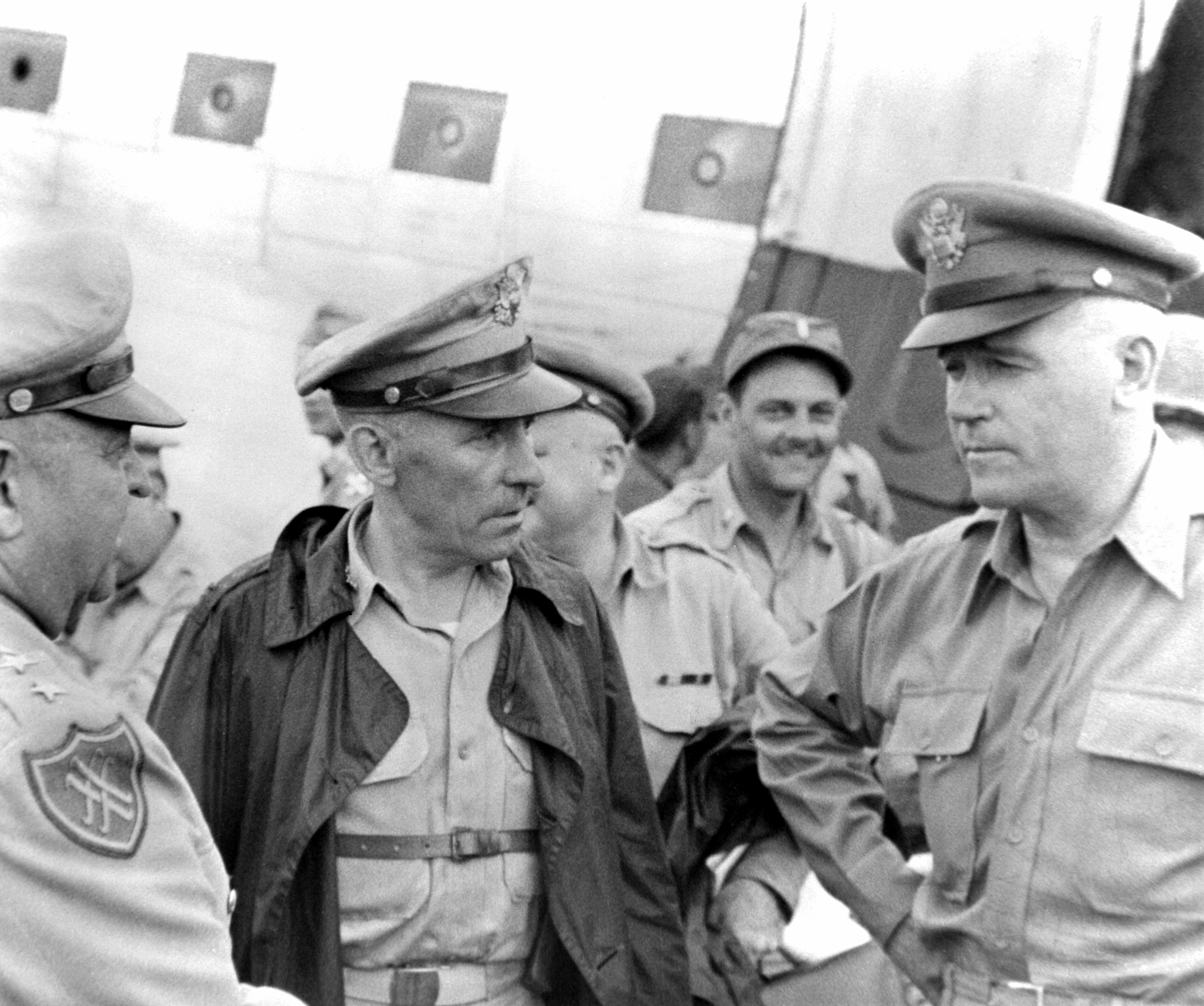
Collins, on right with Walton Walker, on left and John H. Church, center in Korea

Collins was Chief of Staff of the United States Army from 16 August 1949 to 15 August 1953; as such he was the Army's senior officer throughout the Korean War. As a wartime chief of staff his primary responsibility was to ensure that adequately trained and equipped soldiers were sent to fight in Korea. He directed the Army's operation of the railroads, brought the first Special Forces group into the order of battle, and was closely associated with the development of the army's contribution to the newly established North Atlantic Treaty Organization (NATO).

Collins was representative of the United States to the Military Committee and the Standing Group of NATO from 1953 to 1954. He was special representative of the United States to the State of Vietnam with personal ambassadorial rank from 1954 to 1955, and, after advising against American military intervention, returned to his NATO assignment. He retired from active service in March 1956, after almost 40 years of military service.

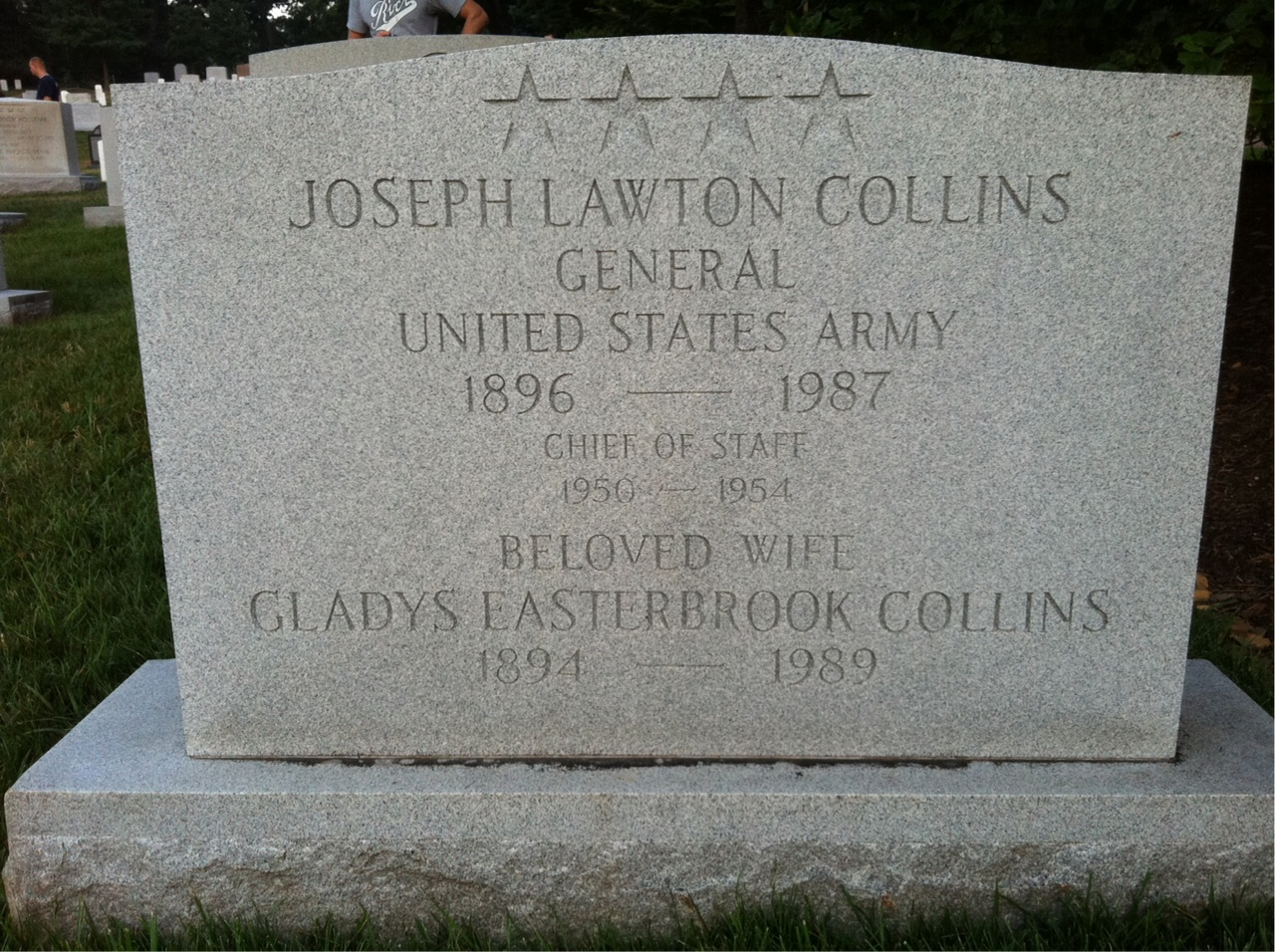
Tomb of Joseph Collins in the Arlington National Cemetery

Collins died of a heart attack in Washington, D.C., on 12 September 1987, at the age of 91. He is buried at Arlington National Cemetery, Virginia.

== Promotions ==
Insignia	Rank	Component	Date	Reference
No pin insignia at the time	Second lieutenant	22nd Infantry	20 April 1917	
	First lieutenant	22nd Infantry	15 May 1917	
	Captain	22nd Infantry (Temporary)	5 August 1917	
	Captain	Infantry	25 June 1918	
	Major	22nd Infantry	9 September 1918	
	Captain	Infantry	25 June 1919 (Returned to grade of captain)	
	Major	Infantry	1 August 1932	
	Lieutenant colonel	Infantry	25 June 1940	
	Colonel	Army of the United States	15 January 1941	
	Brigadier general	Army of the United States	14 February 1942	
	Major general	Army of the United States	26 May 1942	
	Lieutenant general	Army of the United States	16 April 1945	
	Brigadier general	Regular Army	19 June 1945	
	Major general	Regular Army	24 January 1948	
	General	Army of the United States	24 January 1948	
	General	Regular Army, Retired	31 March 1956	

== Bibliography ==
- Bell, William Gardner (2022). Commanding Generals and Chiefs of Staff 1775-2022: Portraits & Biographical Sketches of the United States Army's Senior Officer (PDF). Washington, D.C.: Center of Military History, United States Army. Archived from the original (PDF) on 4 June 2014.
- Collins, J. Lawton (1979). Lightning Joe: An Autobiography. Novato, California: Presidio Press. ISBN 0-89141-530-0. OCLC 31601796.
- Cullum, George W. (1920). Biographical Register of the Officers and Graduates of the US Military Academy at West Point New York since its Establishment in 1802: Supplement Volume VI 1910–1920. Chicago, Illinois: R. R. Donnelly and Sons, The Lakeside Press.
- Cullum, George W. (1930). Biographical Register of the Officers and Graduates of the US Military Academy at West Point New York since its Establishment in 1802: Supplement Volume VII 1920–1930. Chicago, Illinois: R. R. Donnelly and Sons, The Lakeside Press.
- Cullum, George W. (1940). Biographical Register of the Officers and Graduates of the US Military Academy at West Point New York since its Establishment in 1802: Supplement Volume VIII 1930–1940. Chicago, Illinois: R. R. Donnelly and Sons, The Lakeside Press.
- Cullum, George W. (1950). Biographical Register of the Officers and Graduates of the US Military Academy at West Point New York since its Establishment in 1802: Supplement Volume IX 1940–1950. Chicago, Illinois: R. R. Donnelly and Sons, The Lakeside Press.
- Jeffers, H. Paul (2009). Taking Command: General J. Lawton Collins From Guadalcanal to Utah Beach and Victory in Europe. New American Library. ISBN 978-0-451-22687-7. OCLC 268795491.
- Moore, Theo K. (2011). The Crux Of The Fight: General Joseph Lawton Collins' Command Style (PDF). Fort Leavenworth, Kansas: US Army Command and General Staff College. ISBN 978-1-249-41359-2. OCLC 744197620.
- Taaffe, Stephen R. (2013). Marshall and His Generals: U.S. Army Commanders in World War II. Lawrence, Kansas: University Press of Kansas. ISBN 978-0-7006-1942-9. OCLC 840162019.

Military offices
Preceded by Maxwell Murray	Commanding General 25th Infantry Division; 1942–1943	Succeeded by Charles L. Mullins Jr.
Preceded by Roscoe B. Woodruff	Commanding General VII Corps; 1944–1945	Post deactivated
New command	Vice Chief of Staff of the United States Army; 1947–1949	Succeeded by Wade H. Haislip
Preceded by Omar Bradley	Chief of Staff of the United States Army; 1949–1953	Succeeded by Matthew Ridgway
