= James Lawton Collins Jr. =

United States Army officer (1917–2002)

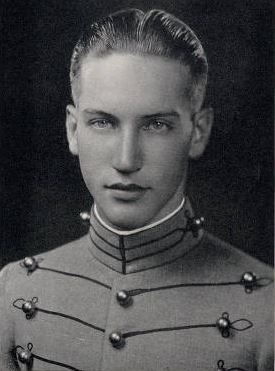
- As a West Point cadet in 1939
- Born: James Lawton Collins Jr. 5 November 1917; El Paso, Texas, U.S.
- Died: 6 May 2002 (aged 84); Middleburg, Virginia, U.S.
- Burial place: Arlington National Cemetery
- Relatives: Joseph Lawton Collins (uncle); James Lawton Collins (father); Michael Collins (brother); Kate Collins (niece)
- Military career
- Allegiance: United States
- Branch: United States Army
- Service years: 1939–1982
- Rank: Brigadier general
- Service number: 21788
- Commands: 957th Field Artillery Battalion; Army Language School; V Corps Artillery
- Conflicts: World War II; Korean War; Vietnam War
- Awards: Army Distinguished Service Medal (3); Silver Star; Legion of Merit (2); Bronze Star Medal; Purple Heart; Croix de Guerre 1939–1945 (France)

James Lawton Collins Jr. (5 November 1917 – 6 May 2002) was a brigadier general in the U.S. Army who served in World War II, the Korean War and the Vietnam War, a military historian, and a viticulturist. He was the son of Major General James Lawton Collins, nephew of General J. Lawton Collins, who served as Chief of Staff of the Army during the Korean War, and older brother of Apollo 11 astronaut Major General Michael Collins. He led a North Dakota National Guard artillery battalion in Normandy in 1944, and served as the U.S. Army Chief of Military History from 1970 to 1982. He was a 1939 graduate of the United States Military Academy at West Point, New York.

== Early life ==
James Lawton Collins Jr. was born in El Paso, Texas, on 5 November 1917, to James Lawton Collins (1882–1963), a U.S. Army officer, and his wife Virginia C. Collins (née Stewart; 1895–1986). He had two younger sisters, Virginia and Agnes, and a younger brother, Michael (1930–2021). Joseph Lawton Collins (1896–1987), who served as Chief of Staff of the Army during the Korean War, was his uncle.

On 1 July 1935, Collins entered the United States Military Academy at West Point, New York, where his father was a graduate of the Class of 1907. Collins graduated 51st out of 456 in the Class of 1939 on 12 June 1939, and was commissioned as a second lieutenant in the Field Artillery. He was posted to the 18th Field Artillery Regiment at Fort Sill, Oklahoma, on 12 September 1939, where he attended an Officers' Specialist Course on horsemanship, and was promoted to first lieutenant on 9 September 1940.

== World War II ==
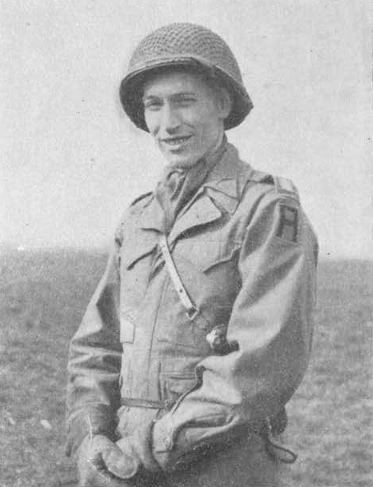
Lieutenant Colonel James L. Collins Jr., as commander of the 957th Field Artillery Battalion

Collins was aide-de-camp to the Commanding General of the Puerto Rico Department (his father) from 25 May to 31 December 1941. On 1 January 1942 he joined the 25th Field Artillery Battalion at Henry Barracks, Puerto Rico. He was promoted to captain in the Army of the United States on 1 February 1942, and commanded Battery B of the 25th from 1 March to 13 September 1942. He then returned to Fort Sill for a new division Officer's Training Course on 5 to 31 October, and was posted to the 331st Field Artillery Battalion of the newly formed 86th Infantry Division as its executive officer on 1 November. He was promoted to major in the Army of the United States on 4 December 1942. He was S-3 of the 86th Infantry Division artillery from 27 April to 23 May 1943, and Assistant G-3 of IX Corps from 24 May to 22 July 1943.

On 26 October 1943, Collins assumed command of the 957th Field Artillery Battalion, a North Dakota Army National Guard unit that had formerly been designated the 2nd Battalion, 188th Field Artillery Regiment, which had been inducted into Federal service on 1 April 1941. It was now equipped with M114 155 mm howitzers. The 957th embarked for the United Kingdom on the MV Britannic on 5 December 1943. Collins was promoted to lieutenant colonel on 1 May 1944. The 957th landed in France at Utah Beach on 13 June 1944, and operated in support of divisions of VII Corps, which was commanded by his uncle.

During Operation Cobra, the 957th suffered 35 casualties, including 13 dead when it was accidentally bombed by American aircraft. Collins was among the wounded, but remained at his post. The 957th later participated in the Battle of Aachen, the Battle of the Bulge, and the Western Allied invasion of Germany. For his services, Collins was awarded the Silver Star, Legion of Merit, Bronze Star Medal, Purple Heart and French Croix de Guerre with palm.

== Post-war ==
After the war, Collins served on the G-2 staff of U.S. Forces in the European Theater until 15 May 1947. He returned to the United States, where he attended the Naval War College in Newport, Rhode Island. He was an instructor at the United States Army Command and General Staff College at Fort Leavenworth, Kansas, from 2 June 1948 to 20 July 1949, and was promoted to colonel in the Field Artillery on 1 July 1948. On 27 June 1949, he entered the University of Virginia, where he earned a master's degree in international relations.

Collins served with the Military Assistance Advisory Group in London from February 1951 to December 1952, and at SHAPE from 1953 to 1954. He attended the Armed Forces Staff College from 1954 to 1955. He was on the staff in the Office of the Deputy Chief of Staff of the United States Army for Logistics, and then in the Office of the Chief of Staff from 1955 to 1958. Fluent in French, Italian, German and Spanish, he commanded the Army Language School in Monterey, California, and from 1959 to 1962 was the first director of the Defense Language Institute in Washington, D.C. He served for two years in South Vietnam as special assistant to General William Westmoreland, spent three years in Washington, D.C., as Deputy Assistant Chief of Staff for Intelligence, and three years in West Germany as commander of the V Corps Artillery. For his post-war services, he was awarded the Distinguished Service Medal with two oak leaf clusters and another Legion of Merit. The citation for the medal reads:

The President of the United States of America, authorized by Act of Congress July 9, 1918, takes pleasure in presenting the Army Distinguished Service Medal to Brigadier General James Lawton Collins, Jr. (ASN: 0-21788), United States Army, for exceptionally meritorious and distinguished services to the Government of the United States, in a duty of great responsibility with Military Assistance Command, Vietnam, in the Republic of Vietnam, during the period from September 1964 to May 1966.

Collins retired from the Army as a brigadier general in 1969, but was recalled to active duty as Chief of Military History. As such, he oversaw the production of a wide range of works on American military history. His works include War in Peacetime: The History and Lessons of Korea (1969), The Development and Training of the South Vietnamese Army, 1950–1972 (1975), Allied Participation in Vietnam (1975), The History of World War II (1979), War in Peace: The Marshall Cavendish Illustrated Encyclopedia of Postwar Conflict (1985), Israeli Paras (1986), and A Guide to the Study and Use of Military History (2000). He teamed up with British historian David G. Chandler to produce the D-Day Encyclopedia (1994). He was president of the U.S. Commission on Military History and the Council on America's Military Past. He was also a member of the International Commission of Military Historians that investigated the wartime of Kurt Waldheim, former President of Austria and Secretary-General of the United Nations.

After retiring a second time in 1982, he began a new career as viticulturist, becoming a member of a Virginia wine cooperative and a grower of Vitis vinifera grapes in Middleburg, Virginia. He died at his home there on 6 May 2002 from a pulmonary embolism, aged 84, and was buried at Arlington National Cemetery.

He and his wife Yolande de Mauduit Collins, the daughter of Georges, Vicomte de Mauduit, had four children: Corrine, Sharon, Suzanne and James Lawton Collins III. The Brigadier General James L. Collins Book Prize for Military History was named in his honor.
