= Israel Mauduit =

British merchant, writer, and colonial agent

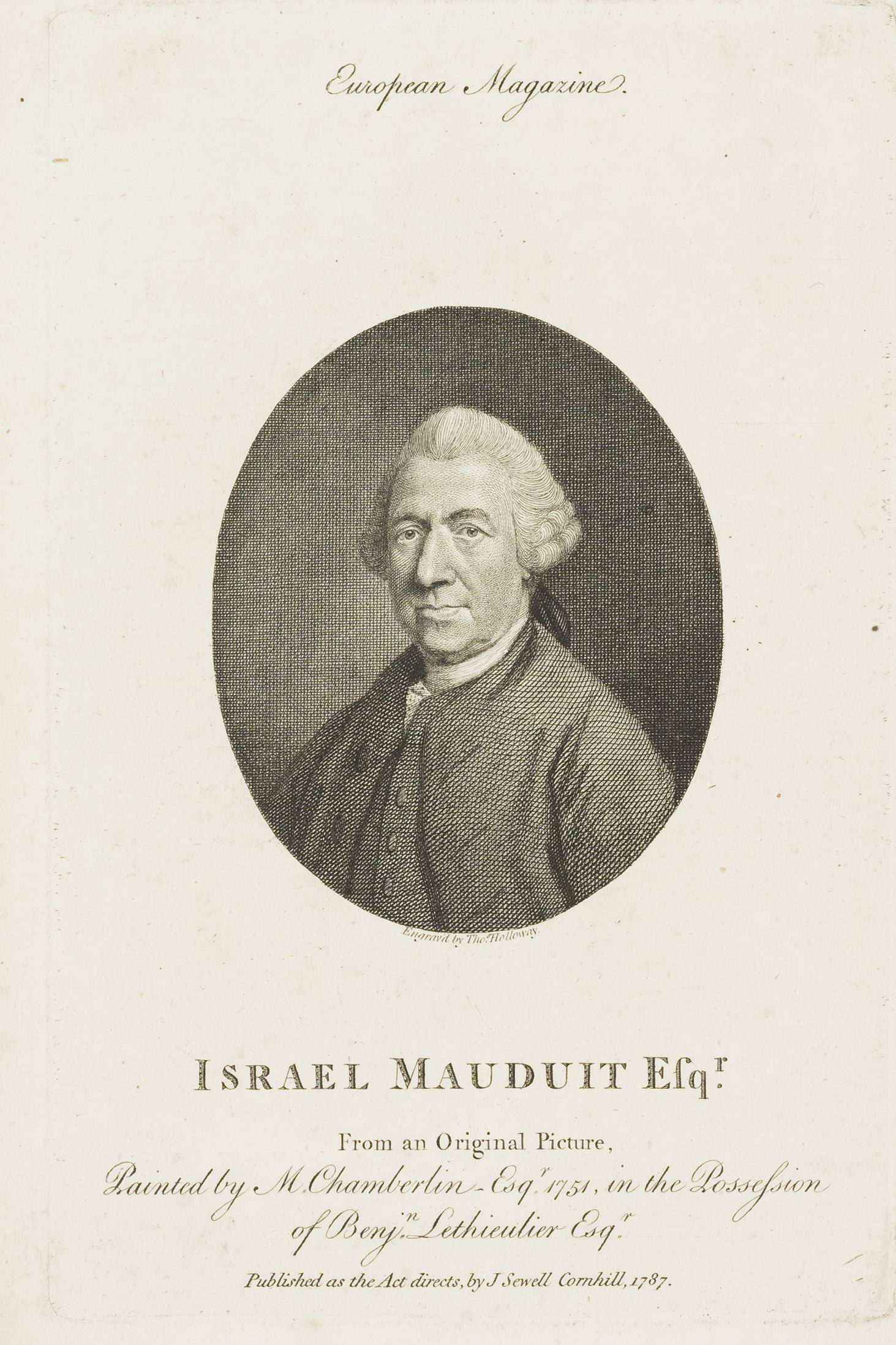
Israel Mauduit

Israel Mauduit (1708 – 14 June 1787) was a British merchant, writer and colonial agent. His surname is sometimes spelled as Maudit.

Israel Mauduit was the son of a dissenting religious minister Isaac Mauduit. His brother was Jasper Mauduit who was a colonial agent too. He was elected a Fellow of the Royal Society in 1751.

Mauduit is best remembered for his popular political pamphlet Considerations on the Present German War. The work was an attack on British continental involvement which included the presence of British troops in the army of Duke Ferdinand of Brunswick and the annual subsidies in gold paid to Britain's German allies during the Seven Years' War. The work was first published in November 1760, and went through five editions. The pamphlet was released amidst rising opposition to Britain's involvement in the German War. Of Mauduit's pamphlet, Horace Walpole wrote: “It was shrewdly and ably written and had more operation in working a change on the minds of men that perhaps ever fell to the lot of a pamphlet.”

After the Seven Years' War, Mauduit continued to publish commentary on colonial affairs, including several pamphlets during the American Revolution. One pamphlet, published in March 1778, advanced the idea of giving the American colonists full independence from Britain. It has been suggested that this tract may have been composed at the behest of Frederick North, Lord North and his cabinet.

Mauduit later served as colonial agent for Massachusetts.

== Bibliography ==
- Anderson, Fred. Crucible of War: The Seven Years' War and the Fate of Empire in British North America, 1754–1766. Faber and Faber, 2000.
- Harding, Nick. Hanover and the British Empire, 1700–1837. The Boydell Press, 2007.
- Mauduit, Israel. A Hand Bill Advocating American Independence, Inspired by the English Ministry. Ed. by Paul Leicester Ford. Brooklyn : Historical Print. Club, 1890.
- Seed, John. Dissenting Histories: Religious Division and the Politics of Memory in Eighteenth-Century England. Edinburgh University Press, 2008.
- Taylor, R. J., “Israel Mauduit,” New England Quarterly, XXIV (1951): 208–230.
