= Collector's Guide Publishing =

Publisher based in Ontario, Canada

- Founded: 1984
- Founder: Robert Godwin
- Country of origin: Canada
- Headquarters location: Burlington, Ontario
- Publication types: Books
- Imprints: Apogee
- Official website: cgpublishing.com

Collector's Guide Publishing (CGP) is a Canadian publisher based in Burlington, Ontario, Canada.

== History ==
The company's first publication was Robert Godwin's Illustrated Collector's Guide to Led Zeppelin released in 1987. Owner Godwin also founded the independent record label Griffin Music in 1989. CGP would supply books for music collectors to the Griffin label for inclusion in box sets with accompanying compact discs. CD/Book packages included sets by Hawkwind, Motörhead, Wishbone Ash and Olivia Newton-John.

In 1998 Godwin started an imprint called Apogee Books specifically for publishing space flight related books. This came about due to a request by Apollo 11 astronaut Buzz Aldrin for Godwin to create a book to commemorate the 30th anniversary of the flight of Apollo 8. Having established a reputation for including compact discs in the back of their music books CGP also elected to include compact discs in their space flight books. The Apogee Books compact discs included hours of NASA film footage and exclusive interviews with astronauts as well as the first appearance of digitally stitched virtual panoramas of the lunar surface photography.

By 2007 Collector's Guide Publishing had approximately 100 books in print including science fiction, guides for music collectors, toy collectors and book collectors as well as an extensive range of space flight books under the Apogee imprint. Authors published by CGP include Sy Liebergot, Frederick I. Ordway III, Martin Popoff, Wernher von Braun, Winston Scott, Walter Schirra, Guenter Wendt, David Lasser, Garrett P. Serviss, William R. Pogue, Gerard O'Neill, Rick Tumlinson and Robert Zubrin.
