= Rocket Science (miniseries) =

Rocket Science is a miniseries first released in 2002-2003, chronicling the major events in the American-Soviet space race, starting from the first hypersonic rocket planes through the development of human space flight, culminating with the mission by mission history of Projects Mercury, Gemini and Apollo. The series features interviews with X-1 and X-15 pilots Chuck Yeager, Scott Crossfield and Pete Knight, astronauts Gordon Cooper, Wally Schirra, Scott Carpenter, Gene Cernan, Frank Borman, James Lovell, Buzz Aldrin and Alan Bean, flight controllers Gene Kranz, Christopher Kraft, John Hodge and Sy Liebergot, engineers Günter Wendt, Max Faget, John Houbolt, Bob Gore, Robert Sieck and Richard Dunne, authors Arthur C. Clarke, Andrew Chaikin, Robert Godwin, Spider Robinson and Robert J. Sawyer, historians Paul Fjeld and Professor John Lienhart, Dr Raymond Puffer and Dr James Young, Manhattan Project physicist Hans Bethe, head of the Lovelace Clinic Dr. Donald E. Kilgore, Dr David Simons of Holloman AFB, Colonel Joe Kittinger, and broadcaster Walter Cronkite, among others. While focusing mainly on the American side of the race, the series also covered major Soviet achievements through every key phase of the 1950s and 1960s Space Race.

The series was produced, written and directed by Canadian filmmaker Michael Lennick for The Discovery Channel (Canada), and narrated by actor Graham Greene. Music was composed by Eric Robertson. Lennick filmed a pilot episode named "The Highest Step" about the high-altitude balloon flights of Project Manhigh and the rocket sled tests of Colonel John Paul Stapp.

In 2003 director Michael Lennick's production company, Foolish Earthling, released the pilot episode on DVD. The rest of the series was released in 2004 in DVD-video format as a three-disc box set with total running time of 540 minutes. This box set did not include the pilot episode. In 2006 Foolish Earthling, released a very limited edition DVD set of the "Director's Cut" in 16:9 format.

Due to contractual restrictions the series was never aired in the United States.

== Episodes ==
=== Disc 1 ===
- The Rocketeers — the history of the X series of aircraft, with emphasis on the Bell X-1 and on the North American X-15 spaceplanes, and on Chuck Yeager's role in breaking the sound barrier.
- The Last Empty Sky — the development of the rocket: 1920 to 1957. The episode mentions Konstantin Tsiolkovsky, Hermann Oberth, Robert Goddard, Wernher von Braun, and Sergey Korolyov as the key figures in development of multistage liquid-fueled rockets.
- The High Ground — the first artificial satellite and the first humans in space. The episode mentions Soviet Sputnik program, the R-7 rocket, the American Vanguard, Redstone and Atlas rockets and the project Mercury.
- Mercury Rising — Project Mercury and first American astronauts.

=== Disc 2 ===
- Missiles to the Moon - John F. Kennedy issues the challenge. America prepares to compete with the Soviets by declaring a landing on the Moon before the end of the decade.
- The Learning Curve - NASA invents space travel with Project Gemini, learning docking, space walking and rendezvous.
- Go Fever - The disaster of Apollo 1 puts NASA on track for the Moon. Go Fever takes over.
- Ten Times Faster Than A Rifle Bullet - The birth of the Saturn V.

=== Disc 3 ===
- We Choose To Go To The Moon - The slow and painful birth of the first true spaceship and the Apollo 8 Christmas voyage around the Moon.
- Before This Decade is Out - Apollo 11 and the first steps on the Moon.
- The Universe Strikes Back - Apollo 11 had been a near miss. Apollo 12 and Apollo 13 were near disasters.
- The Last Man On The Moon - The era of the space cowboy comes to an end.

== Awards ==
The pilot episode won the Silver Award for writing at the 2002 Houston Film Festival and the Spirit of Da Vinci Award for best documentary at the 2006 Da Vinci Film Festival. It also won "Best of Festival" and "Judge's Choice Best Documentary Award" at the White Sands Film Festival in 2007.

In 2003 the series won the Gold REMI award at the Houston International Film Festival for best direction.

== Reception ==
Science fiction author Spider Robinson stated "It literally IS `Rocket Science,' and it covers the early days of space with awesome depth, thoroughness, and thoughtfulness."

== See also ==
- When We Left Earth: The NASA Missions
