= Technologies in 2001: A Space Odyssey =

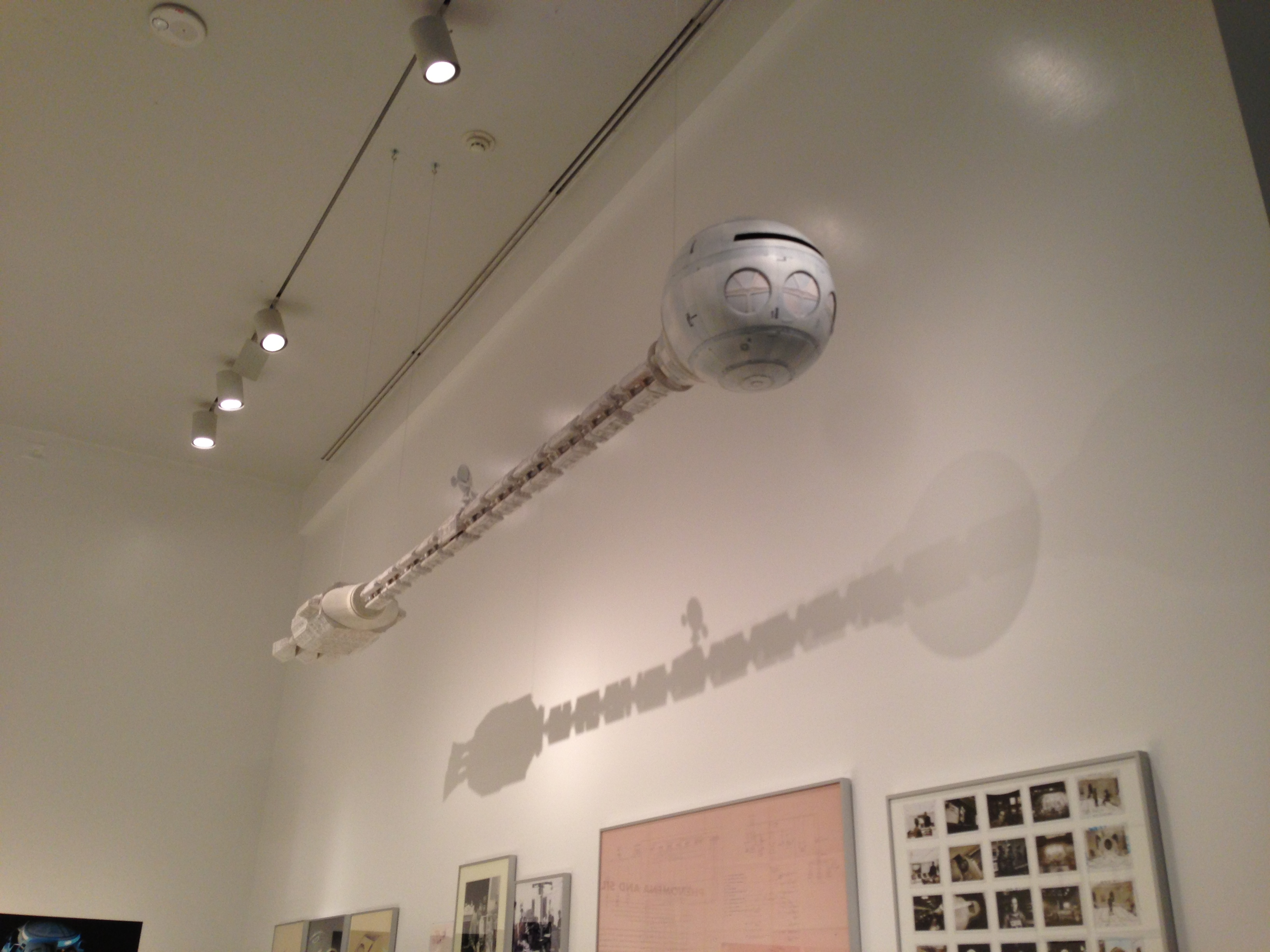
Museum replica model of the Discovery One, the main spaceship featured in 2001.

The 1968 science fiction film 2001: A Space Odyssey featured numerous fictional future technologies, which have proven prescient in light of subsequent developments around the world. Before the film's production began, director Stanley Kubrick sought technical advice from over fifty organizations, and a number of them submitted their ideas to Kubrick of what kind of products might be seen in a movie set in the year 2001. The film is also praised for its accurate portrayal of spaceflight and vacuum.

== Science ==
=== Accuracy ===
2001 is, according to four NASA engineers who based their nuclear-propulsion spacecraft design in part on the film's Discovery One, "perhaps the most thoroughly and accurately researched film in screen history with respect to aerospace engineering." Several technical advisers were hired for 2001, some of whom were recommended by co-screenwriter Arthur C. Clarke, who himself had a background in aerospace. Advisors included Marshall Spaceflight Center engineer Frederick I. Ordway III, who worked on the film for two years, and I. J. Good, whom Kubrick consulted on supercomputers because of Good's authorship of treatises such as "Speculations Concerning the First Ultraintelligent Machine" and "Logic of Man and Machine". Dr. Marvin Minsky of MIT was the main artificial intelligence advisor for the film.

2001 accurately presents outer space as not allowing the propagation of sound, in sharp contrast to other films with space scenes in which explosions or sounds of passing spacecraft are heard.

2001's portrayal of weightlessness in spaceships and outer space is also more realistic. Tracking shots inside the rotating wheel provides artificial gravity contrast with the weightlessness outside the wheel during scenes such as the repair and Hal disconnection scenes, which depict extravehicular activity. There are also scenes which depict astronauts and flight attendants walking upright in zero-gravity with the aid of "grip shoes", which use hook-and-loop fasteners to keep the wearer connected to various surfaces inside the ship.

Other aspects that contribute to the film's realism include the depiction of the time delay in conversations between the astronauts and Earth due to the extreme distance between the two (which the in-film BBC announcer explains has been edited out of the broadcast), the attention to small details such as the sound of breathing inside the spacesuits, the conflicting spatial orientation of astronauts inside a zero-gravity spaceship, and the enormous size of Jupiter in relation to the spaceship.

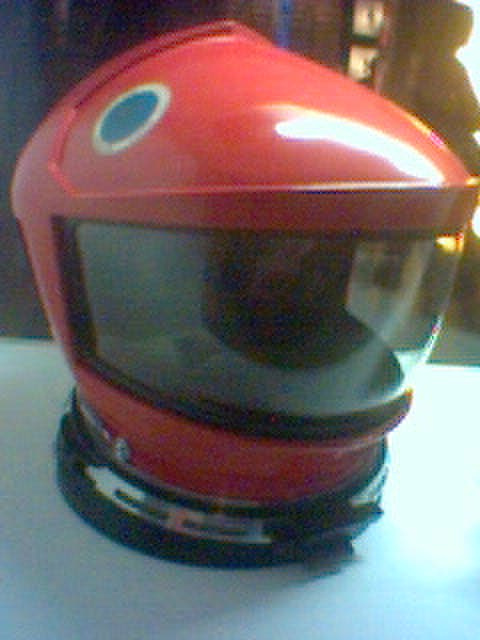
A space suit helmet featured in the film. Kubrick consulted aerospace specialists to ensure the design's accuracy.

The general approach to how space travel is engineered is highly accurate; in particular, the design of the ships was based on actual engineering considerations rather than attempts to look aesthetically "futuristic". Many other science-fiction films give spacecraft an aerodynamic shape, which is superfluous in outer space. (Note: Craft such as the Pan Am shuttle are an exception; they are designed to function in space as well as in atmosphere, and therefore require aerodynamic design considerations.) Kubrick's science advisor, Frederick Ordway, notes that in designing the spacecraft, they "insisted on knowing the purpose and functioning of each assembly and component, down to the logical labeling of individual buttons and the presentation on screens of plausible operating, diagnostic and other data." Onboard equipment and panels on various spacecraft have specific purposes such as alarm, communications, condition display, docking, diagnostic, and navigation, the designs of which relied heavily on NASA's input. Aerospace specialists were also consulted on the design of the spacesuits and space helmets. The space dock at Moon base Clavius shows multiple underground layers, which could sustain high levels of air pressure typical of Earth. The lunar craft design takes into account the lower gravity and lighting conditions on the Moon. The Jupiter-bound Discovery is meant to be powered by a nuclear reactor at its rear, separated from the crew area at the front by hundreds of feet of fuel storage compartments. Although difficult to be recognized as such, actual nuclear reactor control panel displays appear in the astronaut's control area.

The suspended animation of three of the astronauts on board was portrayed accurately according to the direction of consulting medical authorities. Clarke's novelization implies that hibernation would likely be necessary to conserve resources on a flight of this kind.

The depiction of early hominids was based on the writings of anthropologists such as Louis Leakey.

=== Inaccuracy ===
The sequence in which Bowman re-enters Discovery shows him holding his breath just before ejecting from the pod into the emergency airlock. Holding one's breath before exposure to a vacuum would, in reality, rupture the lungs. In an interview on the 2007 DVD release of the film, Clarke states that had he been on the set the day they filmed this, he would have caught this error.

When spacecraft land on the Moon in the film, dust is shown billowing as it would in air, not moving in a sheet as it would in the vacuum of the Lunar surface, as can be seen in Apollo Moon landing footage. While on the Moon, all actors move as if in normal Earth gravity, not as they would in the 1/6 gravity of the Moon. Similarly, the behavior of Dave and Frank in the weightless pod bay is not fully consistent with a zero-G environment. Although the astronauts are wearing zero-G 'grip shoes' in order to walk normally, they are oddly leaning on the table while testing the AE-35 unit as if held down by gravity. Finally, in an environment with a radius as small as the main quarters, the simulated gravity would vary significantly from the center of the crew quarters to the 'floor', even varying between feet, waist, and head. The rotation speed of the crew quarters was meant to be only fast enough to generate an approximation of the Moon's gravity, not that of the Earth. However, Clarke felt this was enough to prevent the physical atrophy that would result from complete weightlessness.

During Floyd's approach to the space station, parts of the spinning wheel appear to be under construction, consisting of nothing more than bare internal structure. Geophysicist Dr. David Stephenson in the Canadian TV documentary 2001 and Beyond notes that "Every engineer that saw [the space station] had a fit. You do not spin on a wheel that is not fully built. You have to finish it before you spin it or else you have real problems".

== Imagining the future ==
Over fifty organizations contributed technical advice to the production, and a number of them submitted their ideas to Kubrick of what kind of products might be seen in a movie set in the year 2001. Much was made by MGM's publicity department of the film's realism, claiming in a 1968 brochure that "Everything in 2001: A Space Odyssey can happen within the next three decades, and...most of the picture will happen by the beginning of the next millennium." Although the predictions central to the plot—colonization of the Moon, crewed interplanetary travel and artificial intelligence—did not materialize by that date, some of the film's other futuristic elements have indeed been realized.

=== Depiction of computers ===
As the central character of the "Jupiter Mission" segment of the film, HAL was shown by Kubrick to have as much intelligence as human beings, possibly more, while sharing their same "emotional potentialities". Kubrick agreed with computer theorists who believed that highly intelligent computers that can learn by experience will inevitably develop emotions such as fear, love, hate, and envy. Such a machine, he said, would eventually manifest human mental disorders as well, such as a nervous breakdown—as Hal did in the film.

Clarke noted that, contrary to popular rumor, it was a complete coincidence that each of the letters of HAL's name immediately preceded those of IBM in the alphabet. The meaning of HAL has been given both as "Heuristically programmed ALgorithmic computer" and as "Heuristic ALgorithmic computer". The former appears in Clarke's novel of 2001 and the latter in his sequel novel 2010. In computer science, a heuristic is a programmable procedure not necessarily based on fixed rules, producing informed guesses often using trial-and-error. The results can be false such as in predictions of stock market, sports scores, or the weather. Sometimes this can entail selecting on-the-fly one of several methods to solve a problem based on previous experience. On the other hand, an algorithm is a programmable procedure that produces reproducible results using invariant established methods (such as computing square roots). A heuristic approach that usually works within a tolerable margin of error may be preferred over a perfect algorithm that requires a long time to run.

During Apple and Samsung's patent war over consumer electronics design, in 2011 Samsung used a still image from the scene in which two astronauts are eating at a table with what appear to be tablet computers as an exhibit to counter Apple's patent claiming the original abstract design of tablet computers.

Common 21st-century computer technology not depicted in the film includes keyboards, mice, mobile phones, touch screens, interfaces with windows/menus/icons. Although there are devices that resemble tablet computers, they are only used in the film as portable video screens.

=== Depiction of spacecraft ===
All of the vehicles in 2001 were designed with extreme care in order for the small-scale models as well as full-scale interiors to appear realistic. The modeling team was led by Kubrick's two hirees from NASA, science advisor Fred Ordway and production designer Harry Lange, along with Anthony Masters who was responsible for turning Lange's 2-D sketches into models. Ordway and Lange insisted on knowing "the purpose and functioning of each assembly and component, down to the labeling of individual buttons and the presentation on screens of plausible operating, diagnostic and other data." Kubrick's team of thirty-five designers was often frustrated by script changes done after designs for various spacecraft had been created. Douglas Trumbull, chief special effects supervisor, writes "One of the most serious problems that plagued us throughout the production was simply keeping track of all ideas, shots, and changes and constantly re-evaluating and updating designs, storyboards, and the script itself. To handle all of this....a "control room"...was used to keep track of all progress on the film." Ordway, who worked on designing the station and the five principal space vehicles, (Note: The two space shuttles, Moon bus, main spaceship, and space pod) has noted that U.S. industry had problems satisfying Kubrick with its equipment suggestions, while design aspects of the vehicles had to be updated often to accommodate rapid screenplay changes, one crew member resigning over an unspecified related issue. Eventually, conflicting ideas of what Kubrick had in mind, what Clarke was writing, and equipment and vehicular realities emerging from Ordway, Lange, Masters, and construction supervisor Dick Frift and his team were resolved, and coalesced into final designs and construction of the spacecraft before filming began in December 1965.

=== Other technologies ===
One futuristic device shown in the film already under development when the film was released in 1968 was voice-print identification; the first prototype was released in 1976. A credible prototype of a chess-playing computer already existed in 1968, even though it could be defeated by experts; computers did not defeat champions until the late 1980s. While 10-digit phone numbers for long-distance national dialing originated in 1951, longer phone numbers for international dialing became a reality in 1970. Installation of personal in-flight entertainment displays by major airlines began in the early-to-mid 1990s, offering video games, TV broadcasts and movies in a manner similar to that shown in the film such as seatback entertainment in aircraft in 1988. The film also shows flat-screen TV monitors, of which the first real-world prototype appeared in 1972 produced by Westinghouse, but was not used for broadcast television until 1998. Plane cockpit integrated system displays, known as "glass cockpits", were introduced in the 1970s (originally in NASA Langley's Boeing 737 Flying Laboratory). Today such cockpits appear not only in high-tech aircraft like the Boeing 777, but have also been employed in space shuttles, the first being Atlantis in 1985. Rudimentary voice-controlled computing began in the early 1980s with the SoftVoice Computer System and existed in more sophisticated form by the early 2000s, although not as sophisticated as depicted in the film. The first picture phone was demonstrated at the 1964 New York World's Fair; however, due to the bandwidth limitations of telephone lines, personal video communication did not succeed commercially and has only been practical over broadband internet connections. Personal (audio) wireless telephones were ubiquitous in 2001, and yet no one in the movie had a small personal communication device.

Some technologies portrayed as common in the film which had not materialized in the 2000s include commonplace civilian space travel, space stations with hotels, Moon colonization, suspended animation of humans, practical nuclear propulsion in spacecraft and strong artificial intelligence of the kind displayed by Hal.

=== Companies and countries ===
There are corporate logos and entities in the film that either did not exist, no longer exist, or were broken up by anti-trust lawsuits. Still others changed their business model or represent countries that no longer exist.

The British Broadcasting Corporation never expanded to have a BBC-12. BBC Three and Four came into existence in 2003 and 2002 respectively and newer channels used names such as BBC News and BBC Parliament. The corporations IBM, Aeroflot, Howard Johnson's, Whirlpool Corporation and Hilton Hotels, visual references of which appear in the film, have survived beyond 2001, although by 2001 Howard Johnson's had switched its business focus to hotels, rather than the restaurants shown in the film. The film depicts a still-existing Pan Am (which went out of business in 1991) and a still-existing Bell System telephone company (which was broken up in 1984 as a result of an anti-monopoly lawsuit filed by the U.S. Justice Department). (Note: On the movie screen, the words "Bell System" appear in the Bell logo on the outside of the PICTUREPHONE booth (starting at 27:17) and on the PICTUREPHONE screen at the end of the call (at 29:23).) The Bell System logo seen in the film was modified in 1969 and dropped entirely in 1983.
