= Project Mars: A Technical Tale =

2006 novel by Wernher von Braun

- First edition cover
- Author: Wernher von Braun
- Illustrator: Chesley Bonestell
- Cover artist: Chesley Bonestell
- Language: English
- Genre: Science fiction
- Publisher: Apogee Books (Canada)
- Publication date: 2006
- Publication place: Canada
- Media type: Trade paperback
- Pages: 280
- ISBN: 978-0-9738203-3-1

Project Mars: A Technical Tale is the English translation of an unpublished German-language science fiction novel written by German-American rocket physicist Wernher von Braun (1912–1977) in 1949. Von Braun’s original title for the work was Marsprojekt. Henry J. White (1892–1962) translated it into English. In 2006, almost 30 years after von Braun’s death, Apogee Books (Canada) published White’s translation as Project Mars: A Technical Tale. As of 2025, the original German text remains unpublished.

Set in the 1980s, the novel describes the first human mission to Mars and its encounter with benevolent Martians there. Although the novel was not published for 57 years, von Braun’s appendix to it, which gives technical specifications for an expedition to Mars, was published in English in 1953 by the University of Illinois Press as The Mars Project.

== Background ==
Von Braun wrote Marsprojekt, a science fiction novel in German, in 1948 and 1949 while stationed at the U.S. Army's rocket research facility at Fort Bliss in New Mexico. It was translated into English as Mars Project by Lieutenant Commander Henry J. White of the United States Navy and cleared for publication by the U.S. Defense Department (DoD) in early 1950. The DoD felt that von Braun's visions of space travel were "too futuristic to infringe on classified matters". Von Braun submitted the English manuscript to eighteen American publishers, but it was rejected by all of them.

In 1952 the technical appendix to "Marsprojekt", which contained projected specifications for the novel's expedition to Mars, was published by West German publisher Umschau Verlag as Das Marsprojekt; the University of Illinois Press brought out the English translation of it the following year, giving it the same title as the full novel, The Mars Project.

In the late 1950s, This Week, an American syndicated magazine supplement for Sunday newspapers, published excerpts from Mars Project. The magazine focused on von Braun's philosophies on space flight and the future of humanity rather than the novel's technical details. Apogee Science Fiction, a Canadian publisher of space-related historical science fiction, published Mars Project as Project Mars: A Technical Tale in 2006, 57 years after von Braun wrote the novel and almost 30 years after his death. The book includes eight pages of colored paintings by American science fiction and space illustrator Chesley Bonestell, who also painted the cover.

In the "Author's Preface", written in 1950 at Fort Bliss, von Braun says his purpose in crafting the story was to "stimulate interest in space travel" and reveals that the scientific data he uses comes from "the results of careful computations or tested scientific observations", including Mars’s physical characteristics. But once his explorers land on the planet, "the solid, scientific platform upon which we have stood sinks beneath our feet and we tread upon the fairy bridge of fantasy". The Martian canals are speculation and the inhabitants pure fiction. He muses that, after enduring "the mass of technical detail … during the long voyage", readers will find that "this part of the story may offer opportunities for ruminative philosophical reflection."

== Publication history ==
The published titles are shown in bold.

- 1948–1949: Wernher von Braun wrote Marsprojekt, a science fiction novel in German.
- 1950: Henry J. White translated Marsprojekt into English as Mars Project.
- 1952: Marsprojekt's technical appendix was published in German by Umschau Verlag as **Das Marsprojekt**.
- 1953: Mars Project's technical appendix was published in English by the University of Illinois Press as **The Mars Project**.
- late 1950s: This Week published excerpts from the unpublished Mars Project novel.
- 2006: The Mars Project novel (White's English translation) was published by Apogee Books as **Project Mars: A Technical Tale**.

== Synopsis ==
Project Mars: A Technical Tale takes place in 1980, thirty years in the future. The world is governed by the United States of Earth, established after a devastating war in the 1970s between the Western Powers and the Eastern Bloc (the Soviet Union and its satellite states as well as Communist China and its satellites). The West won the conflict with the aid of Lunetta, an orbiting space station that dropped nuclear missiles on the Soviet Union. (Note: "Lunetta" was inspired by a short story of the same name that von Braun had written as a teenager about a trip to an orbiting space station.) Soon after peace is declared, a reflecting telescope on Lunetta confirms the existence of canals on Mars, vindicating Percival Lowell's assertion that intelligent life exists on the planet. The President orders a mission to Mars to establish just how intelligent the Martians are and whether they pose a threat to Earth.

Lunetta is used as the base from which to launch a ten-spaceship flotilla to Mars. Materials and equipment are ferried from Earth to the space station where the spaceships are constructed and prepared. Von Braun describes in detail the ships' life support systems and the problems caused by cosmic rays, weightlessness, and boredom. Technical details of the voyage are also given, including necessary mid-course maneuvers. Once in orbit around Mars, three winged landing craft descend to the surface.

The explorers soon make contact with Martians, who are humanoid in appearance and live underground. They welcome the Earthlings, who quickly establish that Martians have an ancient and benevolent "super-civilization". After establishing verbal communication, the humans learn about the Martians' social structure and government, which is run by ten males under the leadership of "the Elon". The visitors witness technology far superior to their own, including underground transport and organ transplants. They also learn Martian views on ethics, morality, and the responsible use of technology.

Earth, pleased with developments on Mars, decides to establish formal diplomatic relations with it. Earth invites three Martians to accompany the explorers on their trip home. After the humans convert their ships so they can return to their mother ships in orbit, the explorers and their three Martian guests head to Earth.

== Reception ==
In a review of the novel on the website Universe Today, Mark Mortimer writes that it is really "a thinly veiled technical overview of how to travel to Mars" illustrating von Braun’s "expectations of interplanetary flight"; Mortimer argues that, since nothing had even been sent into orbit in 1949, much of the book is still relevant today. Mortimer adds that, more than as a technical blueprint, the novel is important for how it deals with social and philosophical aspects of space flight, space exploration, and encounters with extraterrestrial life. While the book lacks "strong plots and vibrant characters", readers will find plenty to interest them, particularly the chance to assess how far we have come since its writing.

Ted Spitzmiller, a reviewer with the National Space Society, finds the novel "interesting" because, besides showing von Braun's "passion for space flight", it also reveals his "philosophy on life". Impressed by von Braun’s knowledge of a range of scientific disciplines, Spitzmiller is awed that he leaves "virtually no technical stone unturned". He does find two drawbacks: "sometimes tedious" technical detail and the translation, which uses arcane English words to try to get von Braun's "Teutonic vocabulary" right. Nevertheless, Spitzmiller deems it "enthralling" and "highly recommend[ed]".

== The "Elon" ==
Interest in this novel increased in 2021 when people connected the Martian leader, called the Elon, to SpaceX founder Elon Musk, suggesting that von Braun may have somehow foreseen Musk's space exploration ventures. However, Errol Musk, Elon's father, asserted in 2022 that he was fully aware of the von Braun connection in naming his son.

Chapter 24 of the novel, "How Mars is Governed", states:

The Martian government was directed by ten men, the leader of whom was elected by universal suffrage for five years and entitled "Elon." Two houses of Parliament enacted the laws to be administered by the Elon and his cabinet.

== Works cited ==
- Bergaust, Erik (September 2017). Wernher von Braun. Stackpole Books. ISBN 978-0-8117-6623-4.
- Neufeld, Michael J. (July–August 2007). "Wernher von Braun's ultimate weapon". Bulletin of the Atomic Scientists. 63 (4): 50–57, 78. Bibcode:2007BuAtS..63d..50J. doi:10.2968/063004019. eISSN 1938-3282. ISSN 0096-3402.
- von Braun, Wernher (2006). Project Mars: A Technical Tale. Apogee Books. ISBN 978-0-9738203-3-1.
