= The Mars Project =

1952 non-fiction scientific book by Wernher von Braun

- First German edition book cover
- Author: Wernher von Braun
- Original title: Das Marsprojekt
- Translator: Henry J. White
- Language: German
- Subject: Human mission to Mars
- Publisher: Frankfurt: Umschau Verlag (German 1st ed.); Urbana: University of Illinois Press (English 1st ed.)
- Publication date: 1952
- Publication place: Germany
- English publication date: 1953
- Media type: print (hardback)
- Pages: 81 (German 1st ed.); 91 (English 1st ed.)
- Followed by: The Exploration of Mars

The Mars Project (German: Das Marsprojekt) is a 1952 non-fiction scientific book by the German (later German-American) rocket physicist, astronautics engineer and space architect Wernher von Braun. It was translated from the original German by Henry J. White and first published in English by the University of Illinois Press in 1953.

The Mars Project is a technical specification for a human expedition to Mars. It was written by von Braun in 1948 and was the first "technically comprehensive design" for such an expedition. The book has been described as "the most influential book on planning human missions to Mars".

== Background ==
Wernher von Braun developed a fascination for interplanetary flight while he was still at school in Germany. In 1930 he went to university in Berlin to study engineering, and there he joined the Spaceflight Society (Verein für Raumschiffahrt) and later worked on the design of liquid-fuel rockets. Shortly before the outbreak of World War II, von Braun was recruited by the German Army to assist in the building of long-range military rockets. He became technical leader of the team that developed the V-2 rocket. As the war drew to a close in early 1945 von Braun and his rocket team fled the advancing Red Army, and later surrendered to American troops. Von Braun and his scientists, plus 100 V-2s, were shipped to the U.S. Army's rocket research facility at Fort Bliss in New Mexico.

In 1948 the U.S. Army's V-2 test program was completed and von Braun used his spare time to write a science fiction novel about a human mission to Mars. He based his story on comprehensive engineering diagrams and calculations, which he included in an appendix to the manuscript. The novel was not published, but the appendix formed the basis of a lecture von Braun gave at the First Symposium on Spaceflight held at the Hayden Planetarium in New York City in 1951. The appendix was also published in a special edition of the German space flight journal Weltraumfahrt in 1952, and later that year in hardback by Umschau Verlag in West Germany as Das Marsprojekt. It was translated into English by Henry J. White and published in the United States in 1953 by the University of Illinois Press as The Mars Project.

== Publication history ==
The published titles are shown in bold.

- 1948–1949: Wernher von Braun wrote Marsprojekt, a science fiction novel in German.
- 1950: Henry J. White translated Marsprojekt into English as Mars Project.
- 1952: Marsprojekt's technical appendix was published in German by Umschau Verlag as **Das Marsprojekt**.
- 1953: Mars Project's technical appendix was published in English by the University of Illinois Press as **The Mars Project**.
- late 1950s: This Week published excerpts from the unpublished Mars Project novel.
- 2006: The Mars Project novel was published by Apogee Books as **Project Mars: A Technical Tale**.

== Synopsis ==
The Mars Project is a technical specification for a human mission to Mars that von Braun wrote in 1948, with a provisional launch date of 1965. He envisioned an "enormous scientific expedition" involving a fleet of ten spacecraft with 70 crew members that would spend 443 days on the surface of Mars before returning to Earth. The spacecraft, seven passenger ships, and three cargo ships, would all be assembled in Earth orbit using materials supplied by 950 launches of three-stage reusable heavy-lift launch vehicles. The fleet would use a nitric acid/hydrazine propellant that, although corrosive and toxic, could be stored without refrigeration during the three-year round-trip to Mars. Von Braun calculated the size and weight of each ship, and how much fuel each of them would require for the round trip (5,320,000 metric tons). Hohmann trajectories would be used to move from Earth- to Mars-orbit, and von Braun computed each rocket burn necessary to perform the required manoeuvres.

Once in Mars orbit, the crew would use telescopes to find a suitable site for their base camp near the equator. A crewed winged craft would detach itself from one of the orbiting ships and glide down to one of Mars' poles and use skis to land on the ice. The crew would then travel 6,500 km overland using crawlers to the identified base camp site and build a landing strip. The rest of the ground crew would descend from orbit to the landing strip in wheeled gliders. A skeleton crew would remain behind in the orbiting ships. The gliders would also serve as ascent craft to return the crew to the mother ships at the end of the ground mission.

Von Braun based his Mars Project on the large Antarctic expeditions of the day. For example, Operation Highjump (1946–1947) was a United States Navy program that included 4,700 men, 13 ships and 23 aircraft. At the time, Antarctic explorers were cut off from the rest of the world and the necessary skills had to be on hand to deal with any problem that arose. Von Braun expected the Martian explorers to face similar problems and included a large multi-disciplined crew in his mission, as well as multiple ships and landers for redundancy to reduce risk to personnel.

== Shortcomings ==
In his introduction to The Mars Project, von Braun stated that his study was not yet complete. He said that he had omitted the details of some topics that would need to be addressed further, including the eccentric orbit of Mars, interplanetary astronavigation, meteor showers, and the long-term effects of spaceflight on humans.

There are other shortcomings in The Mars Project that von Braun could not have anticipated in 1948. He had not planned on any uncrewed exploratory missions to Mars taking place before the first human expedition, and he had not foreseen the technological advances that would take place, or the development of robot spacecraft. It was not until 1965 that the uncrewed Mariner 4 spacecraft found that the density of the Martian atmosphere was only one tenth of what had been estimated, making it clear that the huge winged gliders planned by von Braun would not have had enough lift to be able to descend safely onto the surface of Mars. The danger of high energy solar and cosmic radiation beyond low Earth orbit was not known in 1948. The Van Allen radiation belts were not discovered until 1958, and von Braun did not plan for the protection of the crews from such radiation, whether in space or on the Martian surface.

== Influence ==
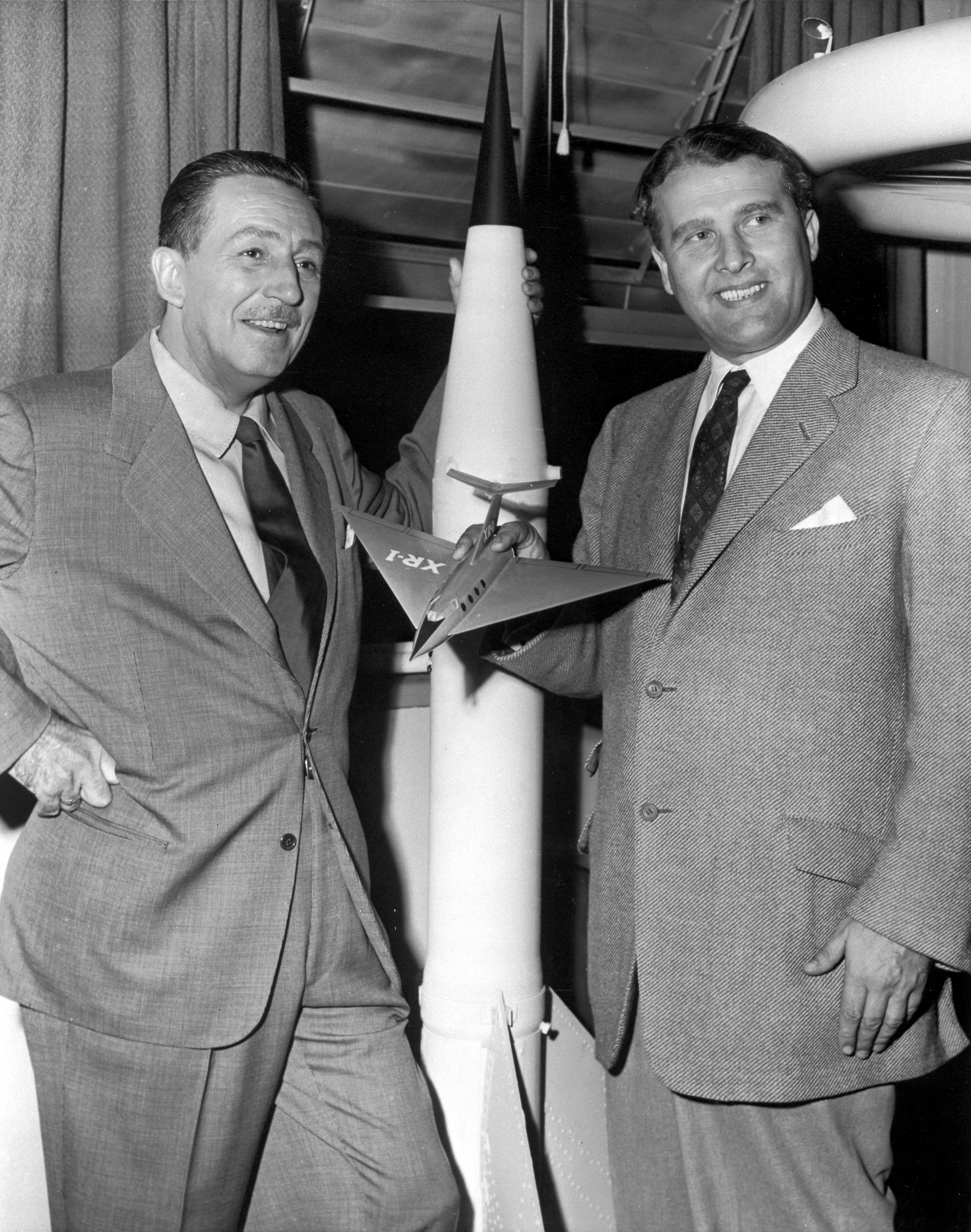
Walt Disney (left) and Wernher von Braun in 1954

The Mars Project was the first technical study on the feasibility of a human mission to Mars, and has been regarded as "the most influential book" on planning such missions. Mark Wade wrote in Encyclopedia Astronautica, "What is astonishing is that von Braun's scenario is still valid today."

Between 1952 and 1954, one of America's popular magazines, Collier's brought von Braun's ideas to the attention of the general public when they published a series of eight articles on space flight and exploration entitled "Man Will Conquer Space Soon!". Von Braun contributed to many of the articles, which were illustrated with paintings by space artists Chesley Bonestell and others. The success of the Collier's series made von Braun a household name, and he appeared on several TV shows. He also collaborated with Walt Disney and appeared in three episodes of Disney's Disneyland TV program. The two other shows that featured von Braun were "Man and the Moon" and "Mars and Beyond".

In 1956 von Braun revised his Mars Plan and scaled down the size of the mission to two ships and 12 crew, requiring only 400 launches to launch the components and fuel to assemble in orbit. He published his results in a new book, The Exploration of Mars with co-author German-American science writer and space advocate, Willy Ley. The original Mars Project was later republished by the University of Illinois Press in 1962, and again in 1991, with a foreword by American scientist and the third Administrator of NASA, Thomas O. Paine.

Von Braun's unpublished science fiction novel from 1948 was eventually published in Canada by Apogee Books in December 2006 as Project Mars: A Technical Tale. It included his technical papers on the proposed project and paintings by Chesley Bonestell. (Note: The Internet Archive copy of Project Mars: A Technical Tale, the novel published in 2006, incorrectly shows its publication date as 1953, the year the English translation of The Mars Project was published.)

== Works cited ==
- von Braun, Wernher (1991) [1952]. The Mars Project (2nd ed.). University of Illinois Press. ISBN 978-0-252-06227-8.
