= When We Left Earth: The NASA Missions =

Documentary miniseries

- DVD/Blu-ray case
- Genre: Documentary, science, space exploration, historical
- Narrated by: Gary Sinise
- Country of origin: United States
- Original language: English
- No. of episodes: 6

Production
- Running time: 6 hours (6 1-hour-long episodes, originally aired as a double bill)

Original release
- Network: Discovery Channel
- Release: June 8 (United States) – July 13, 2008

When We Left Earth: The NASA Missions (or NASA's Greatest Missions: When We Left Earth in the UK) is a 2008 Discovery Channel HD documentary miniseries consisting of six episodes documenting American human spaceflight from the first Mercury flights and the Gemini program, to the Apollo program and its Moon missions and landings, to the Space Shuttle missions and the construction of the International Space Station.

The miniseries was created in association with NASA to commemorate the agency's fiftieth anniversary in 2008. It first aired on June 8, and concluded on June 22. Each airing consisted of two hour-long episodes. The miniseries was then released on DVD on July 10, 2008, and released on Blu-ray disc on August 12.

== Production ==
=== Development ===
Discovery partnered with NASA in September 2007 to create the series. The Discovery team went through 500 hours of archived film and selected 150 hours of it to be transferred to high definition. Discovery donated the high definition film back to NASA. The airing of the miniseries was timed to coincide with NASA's 50th anniversary.

=== Executive producers and showrunners ===
The miniseries features interviews from Mercury, Gemini, Apollo, and Space Shuttle astronauts including John Glenn and Neil Armstrong, as well as NASA officials including flight directors Chris Kraft, Gene Kranz, and Glynn Lunney, former president George H. W. Bush and long-time NBC space journalist Jay Barbree.

The series was narrated by actor Gary Sinise, who played astronaut Ken Mattingly in the 1995 film Apollo 13. It was executive produced by Richard Dale and Bill Howard and edited by Peter Parnham and Simon Holland.

One purpose of the series was to tell the space race story to the under 40 generation, which did not experience it firsthand.

=== Music ===
The score was composed by Richard Blair-Oliphant and conducted by Benjamin Wallfisch (Atonement 2007, The Soloist 2009). Music and sound were nominated for a 2009 News and Documentary Emmy Award for Outstanding Individual Achievement in Music and Sound.

== Episodes ==
No.	Title	Original release date
1	"Ordinary Supermen"	June 8, 2008
The first episode of the series documents the start of the Space Race and the flights of the Mercury Program, beginning with flight testing of the X-15 rocket plane, Alan Shepard's flight as the first American astronaut aboard Freedom 7, and John Glenn's historic flight Friendship 7 and the potentially fatal problem with the heatshield that occurred during the second orbit. Neil Armstrong, Chris Kraft, Glynn Lunney, Gene Kranz, and NBC News space correspondent Jay Barbree are among those interviewed.
2	"Friends and Rivals"	June 15, 2008
The second episode is centered on Project Gemini, the second American human spaceflight program. The episode shows how the astronauts trained for spaceflight. It features the first American spacewalk by Gemini 4 astronaut Ed White. It also features the first space rendezvous with Gemini 6 and 7 and a two-week-long mission on Gemini 7. It also includes the first docking in space on Gemini 8 and the first mission abort in space, also on Gemini 8. Lastly, it shows the first American to conduct an EVA, or Extra-vehicular activity, Ed White.
3	"Landing the Eagle"	June 15, 2008
The third episode details the beginning of the Apollo program, starting with rocket engine testing of the F-1 engines, the Apollo 1 disaster, the flights of Apollo 8, 9, and 10, the tense lunar descent of Apollo 11's Lunar Module Eagle, and the first human footsteps on the lunar surface. Both Buzz Aldrin and the rarely interviewed Neil Armstrong appear in the episode, as well as all of the Apollo 8 astronauts, Commander Jim McDivitt of Apollo 9, Apollo 10 astronauts Gene Cernan and John Young, and capsule communicators Charlie Duke and Bruce McCandless II and flight director Gene Kranz.
4	"The Explorers"	July 6, 2008
The fourth episode features the five other successful Moon landings. It shows Apollo 12's exploration of the Ocean of Storms. The episode focuses on the "successful failure" of Apollo 13. After the successful Apollo 14, the remaining lunar missions involved more surface exploration. It shows the design and testing of the Lunar Roving Vehicle used in Apollo 15, 16, and 17, and documents the missions. The episode discusses the cancelled lunar missions, including recycling the hardware for use in the space station Skylab.
5	"The Shuttle"	July 13, 2008
The penultimate episode focuses on the flights of the Space Shuttle, beginning with Columbia's maiden voyage on April 12, 1981 (the twentieth anniversary of the first human spaceflight, Vostok 1). The STS-1 crew, commander John Young, and pilot Bob Crippen, are interviewed. Bruce McCandless's untethered spacewalk on STS-41-B - the first in history - is shown digitally remastered in high-definition. The episode also documents the Space Shuttle Challenger disaster that occurred 73 seconds after lift-off on mission STS-51-L, on January 28, 1986, and the subsequent halt of the Space Shuttle program. The episode ends with the launch of the Hubble Space Telescope in 1990 on mission STS-31 and the subsequent discovery of its defective mirror.
6	"A Home in Space"	July 13, 2008
The series' final episode centers on the first refurbishment mission of the Hubble Space Telescope, and launch, assembly, and construction of the International Space Station. Shuttle astronauts, including Scott Altman, Michael Lopez-Alegria (the US record holder for number and duration of spacewalks), Ken Bowersox, and Eileen Collins, are featured in the episode. The episode also recalls the Space Shuttle Columbia disaster that occurred during re-entry, 16 minutes from landing at the Kennedy Space Center, on mission STS-107, on February 1, 2003.

== Release ==
The first two installments of When We Left Earth originally premiered on Discovery Channel June 8, 2008. Two more episodes were played on the following two Sundays. The miniseries was released on DVD on July 10, 2008, and was released on Blu-ray disc on August 12.

The third episode, "Landing the Eagle", was re-aired on July 20, 2009 for the 40th anniversary of the Apollo 11 Moon landing. The first episode was re-aired December 11, 2016 in honor of John Glenn, who died December 8, 2016.

== Reception ==
The astronauts involved with the film believed the high definition version of the footage helped capture what they really saw. Astronaut Charlie Duke said, "[It] captures what we see and what we felt and what we experienced, the reality, the vividness, the emotional side of it." Cary Darling of Herald and Review said that the miniseries is less about NASA's setbacks, and more about a "great-to-look-at, old-fashioned hero worship of those who dare to reach for the heavens." High-Def Digest said this documentary was special because of its focus on human elements instead of scientific milestones, but wished it could have focused on efforts by other countries as well.

== See also ==
- Space Race (TV series)
- Rocket Science (miniseries)
- Apollo 11 in popular culture
