= Eric Robertson (composer) =

Scottish composer and musician in Canada

- Born: 6 April 1948 (age 78); Edinburgh, Scotland, UK
- Occupations: Musician, composer, record producer
- Formerly of: The Majestics, Orchestra Eric Robertson, The Burns Musical Society, Rubberneck

Eric Nathan Robertson (born 6 April 1948) is a Scottish composer, organist, pianist, and record producer who has been primarily active in Canada. A two time Gemini Award winner, he has composed more than 60 film scores and written music for a number of television series in Canada and the United States. He has also written a considerable amount of choral and organ music, sometimes with instrumental or symphonic accompaniment. His works display a strong influence of Ralph Vaughan Williams, Charles Wood, and William O. Minay, the latter of whom he studied with for over 30 years. He has also produced and played on numerous commercial albums by a variety of artists and released several of his own albums of popular songs and film themes under the name Magic Melodies.

== Background ==
Born in Edinburgh, Robertson began his musical training in organ, piano, and music theory in his native city where he was a pupil of E. Francis Thomas, Eric Reid, and William O. Minay. In 1963, at the age of 15, he entered The Royal Conservatory of Music (RCM) in Toronto, Canada, where he was a student of Charles Peaker (organ) and Samuel Dolin (music composition). He graduated with an associate degree from the RCM in 1966. In 1969, he was made a Fellow of the Royal Canadian College of Organists. He also continued his studies with Minay up into the 1990s through annual trips back to Edinburgh.

Robertson began his professional music career as a teenager while a student at the RCM; serving as the music director at St. John's Lutheran Church in Toronto and playing the organ in the Toronto R&B band Majestics. He soon began composing music for both the church and the recording studio, was active as a studio musician, and a frequent recitalist on CBC Radio; pursuits that he has continued in throughout his career. In 1966, he became the organist/choirmaster of Humbercrest United Church, leaving there in 1990 to assume a similar post at St. Paul's, Bloor Street where he remained until 2009.

As a record producer, Robertson has produced and played on recordings by artists like Liona Boyd, Moe Koffman, Nana Mouskouri, and Roger Whittaker among others. He has also recorded several of his own albums of popular songs and movie themes under the name Magic Melodies, the first of which sold 300,000 copies in Canada and more than 1.25 million copies internationally. In 1978, he became music director for the CBC Television program The Tommy Hunter Show.

Robertson was at one time married to singer / actress Stephanie Taylor.

== Career ==
Robertson began his work as film score composer with the feature film A Quiet Day in Belfast (1974). He next composed the music for the television film The Insurance Man from Ingersoll (1975) and the television series Readalong (1976). He has remained active composing music for both the big screen and television. His feature film credits include Plague (1979), If You Could See What I Hear (1982), Spasms (1983), That's My Baby! (1984), Millennium (1989), Full Disclosure (2001), and Elliot Smelliot (2004), among others. He has composed music for television films like Shocktrauma (1982), A Muppet Family Christmas (1987), The Challengers (1990), Getting Married in Buffalo Jump (1990), I'll Never Get to Heaven (1993) and A Holiday to Remember (1995). He wrote the music for the television mini-series Rocket Science (2002) and for television series like Read All About It! (1979-1983), Street Legal (1987-1994), OWL/TV (1989-1994), and Black Harbour (1996-1999); the latter of which he was awarded his first Gemini Award for in 1996. He received his second Gemini Award in 2001 for the music for the documentary film Canada: A People's History and was most recently nominated for a Gemini in 2007 for the documentary Hockey: A People's History. He also composed the music for the animated series of Watership Down (1999-2001) and contributed music to a number of television specials featuring The Muppets.

Outside of television and film, Robertson is best known for his choral and organ compositions. His Four Songs of Remembrance (1983) for choir and orchestra was commissioned and recorded by the Orpheus Choir of Toronto, and his choral work Another Spring (1988) was commissioned by the Guelph Spring Festival. His Jazz Magnificat (1985) was written for Ward Swingle and The Swingle Singers and his Variations on the 'Sussex Carol' was commissioned and recorded by the Elmer Iseler Singers. Also notable among his choral pieces is Prewett in Love (1988), which contains clarinet and piano accompaniment.

== Discography ==
=== Charting albums ===
List of albums, with selected details and chart positions
Title	Album details	Peak chart positions
Title	Album details	AUS
Piano Hits	Released: 1983; Format: LP, Cassette; Label: J&B (JB 131)	6
All New Piano Hits '84	Released: 1983; Format: LP, cassette; Label: J&B (JB 169)	22
Piano Hits of the '80s	Released: March 1990; Format: LP, cassette; Label: J&B (JB 169)	58
