= Apogee Books =

Canadian book publisher

- Parent company: Collector's Guide Publishing
- Founded: 1998
- Founder: Robert Godwin
- Country of origin: Canada
- Headquarters location: Burlington, Ontario
- Publication types: Books
- Nonfiction topics: Outer space
- Fiction genres: Science fiction
- Official website: cgpublishing.com

Apogee Books is an imprint of Canadian publishing house Collector's Guide Publishing. The Apogee imprint began with "Apollo 8 The NASA Mission Reports" in November 1998 at the request of astronaut Buzz Aldrin, second man on the moon. The first publication by Apogee was printed to celebrate the 30th anniversary of the first crewed flight around the moon. A limited edition print run of this Apollo 8 book led to Aldrin suggesting that the imprint continue with further anniversary publications.

In March 1999 Apogee published the book Apollo 9 – The NASA Mission Reports. Since that time Apogee has been the winner of the Space Frontier Foundation's media award and has published almost 100 books on space flight. Almost all of the Apogee titles were packaged with CDROMs or DVDs which included what was, at the time, the first digital release of seminal NASA footage, including the first commercial release of the uncut television broadcast of the Apollo 11 moonwalk. Notable contributors to the Apogee series include Sir Arthur C. Clarke, Tom Hanks, Ron Howard, Buzz Aldrin, Harrison Schmitt, William Pogue, Wernher von Braun, David Lasser, Sy Liebergot, Guenter Wendt, Robert Zubrin, Wally Schirra, David R. Scott, Rick Tumlinson and Winston E. Scott. Apogee Books has performed contracted work with or for Lockheed, Boeing, Energia, NASA, Imax, Space Frontier Foundation, The Mars Society and The National Space Society.

An offshoot of Apogee Books, publishing science fiction, began in 2005. Apogee Science Fiction specializes in space-related historical science fiction. By 2007 titles had been published by Hugo Gernsback, Garrett P. Serviss, Wernher von Braun, and George Griffith.
