= USNS Wally Schirra =

Cargo ship of the United States Navy

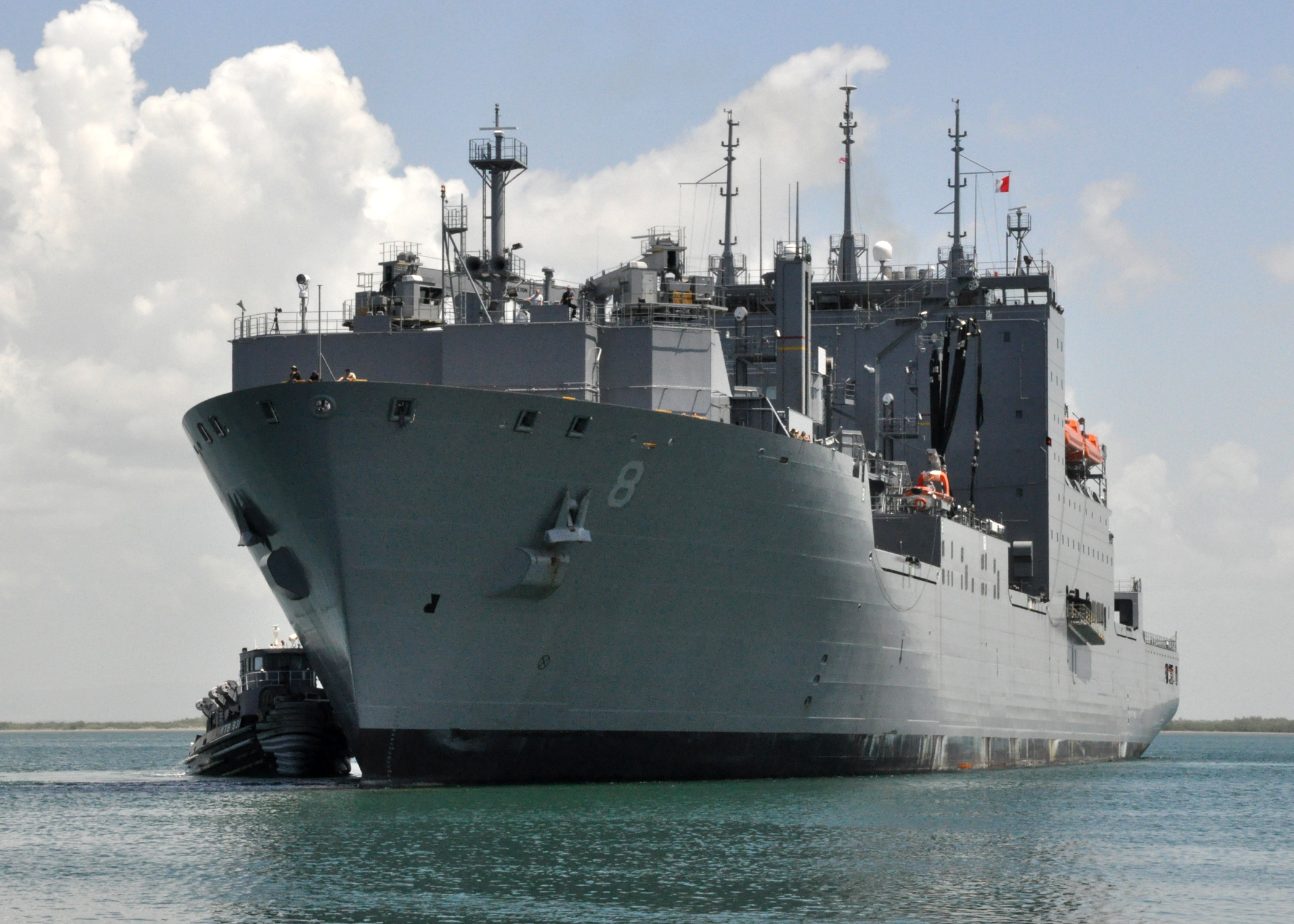

History
- Name: Wally Schirra
- Namesake: Wally Schirra
- Awarded: 11 January 2005
- Builder: National Steel & Shipbuilding
- Laid down: 14 April 2008
- Launched: 08 March 2009
- Sponsored by: Josephine Schirra
- Christened: 08 March 2009
- Acquired: 1 September 2009
- Identification: IMO number: 9345116; MMSI number: 338927000; Callsign: NSCH
- Status: in active service

General characteristics
- Class & type: Lewis and Clark-class cargo ship
- Displacement: 23,852 tons light, 40,298 tons full, 16,446 tons dead
- Length: 210 m (689 ft) overall, 199.3 m (654 ft) waterline
- Beam: 32.3 m (106 ft) extreme, 32.3 m (106 ft) waterline
- Draft: 9.1 m (30 ft) maximum, 9.4 m (31 ft) limit
- Propulsion: Integrated propulsion and ship service electrical system, with generation at 6.6 kV by FM/MAN B&W diesel generators; one fixed pitch propeller; bow thruster
- Speed: 20 knots (37 km/h)
- Range: 14,000 nautical miles at 20 kt; (26,000 km at 37 km/h)
- Capacity: Max dry cargo weight: 5,910 long tons (6,000 t); Max dry cargo volume: 783,000 cubic feet (22,200 m^{3}); Max cargo fuel weight: 2,350 long tons (2,390 t); Cargo fuel volume: 18,000 barrels (2,900 m³); (DFM: 10,500) (JP5:7,500)
- Complement: 49 military, 123 civilian
- Electronic warfare & decoys: Nulka decoy launchers
- Armament: 2–6 × 0.5 in (12.7 mm) machine guns; or 7.62 mm medium machine guns
- Aircraft carried: two helicopters, either Sikorsky MH-60S Knighthawk or Aerospatiale Puma

USNS Wally Schirra (T-AKE-8) is a Lewis and Clark-class dry cargo ship of the United States Navy, named in honor of Captain Wally Schirra (1923–2007), one of the Mercury Seven astronauts, who flew three times in space, on Mercury 8, Gemini 6A, and Apollo 7.

The contract to build Wally Schirra was awarded to National Steel and Shipbuilding Company (NASSCO) of San Diego, California, on 11 January 2005. Her keel was laid down on 14 April 2008, and she was launched and christened 8 March 2009 in a ceremony held at the NASSCO shipyard in San Diego. Serving as ship's sponsor, Josephine Schirra christened the ship in honor of her late husband.

Wally Schirra is the eighth ship of the Lewis and Clark class, and as part of Military Sealift Command's Naval Fleet Auxiliary Force, Wally Schirra is crewed by 124 civil service mariners and 11 Navy Sailors. The ship is designed to operate independently for extended periods at sea and can carry two helicopters and additional military personnel to conduct vertical replenishment.

The Wally Schirra became the first U.S. naval vessel to undergo maintenance, repairs, and overhaul at a South Korean shipyard on March 13, 2024, after spending six months at Korean shipbuilder Hanwha Ocean's shipyard. The ship also became the fifth U.S. naval vessel to undertake repair works at India's Kattupalli Shipyard in November 2026.
