= Wally Schirra =

American astronaut (1923–2007)

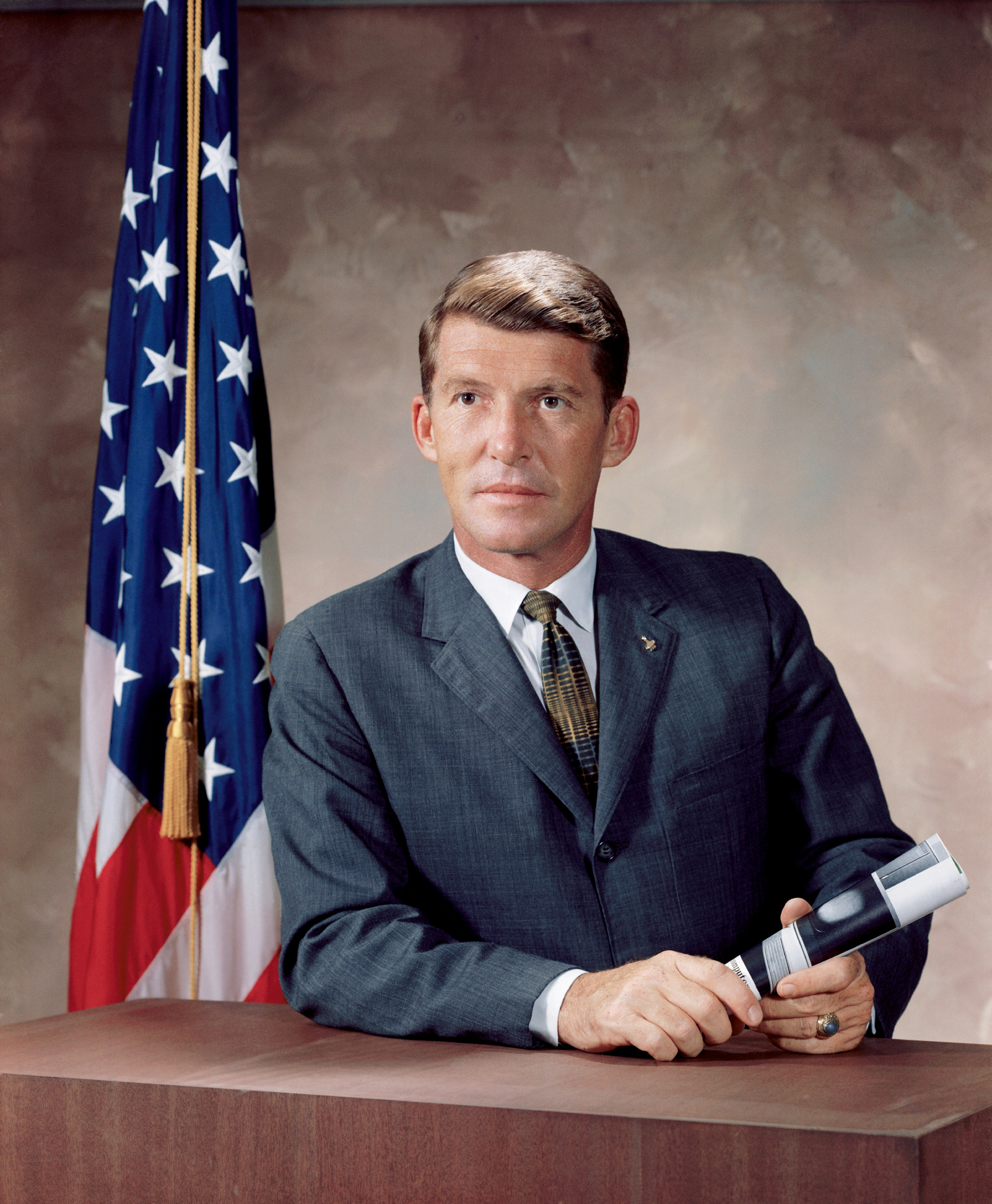
- Schirra in 1964
- Born: Walter Marty Schirra Jr. March 12, 1923; Hackensack, New Jersey, U.S.
- Died: May 3, 2007 (aged 84); San Diego, California, U.S.
- Education: New Jersey Institute of Technology; United States Naval Academy (BS)
- Spouse: Josephine Cook Fraser (m. 1946)
- Awards: Navy Distinguished Service Medal; Distinguished Flying Cross (3); Air Medal (3); NASA Distinguished Service Medal (3); NASA Exceptional Service Medal
- Space career

NASA astronaut
- Rank: Captain, USN
- Time in space: 12d 7h 12m
- Selection: NASA Group 1 (1959)
- Mission: Mercury-Atlas 8; Gemini 6A; Apollo 7
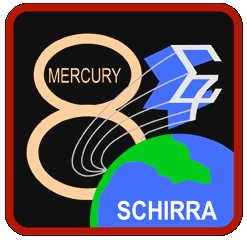
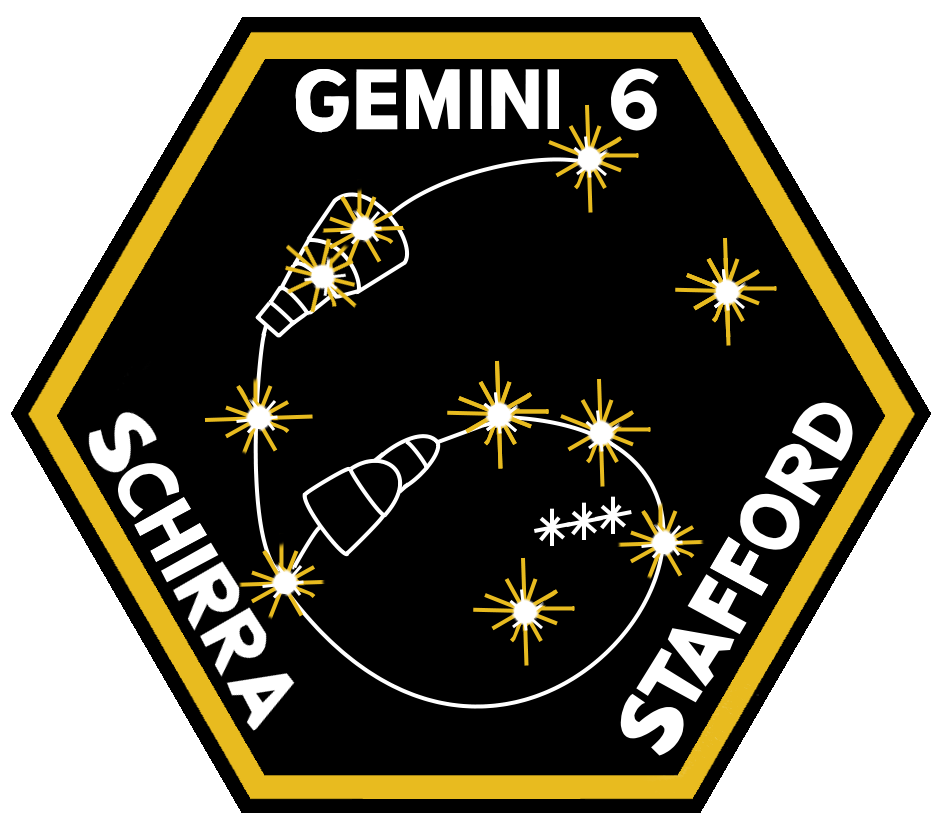
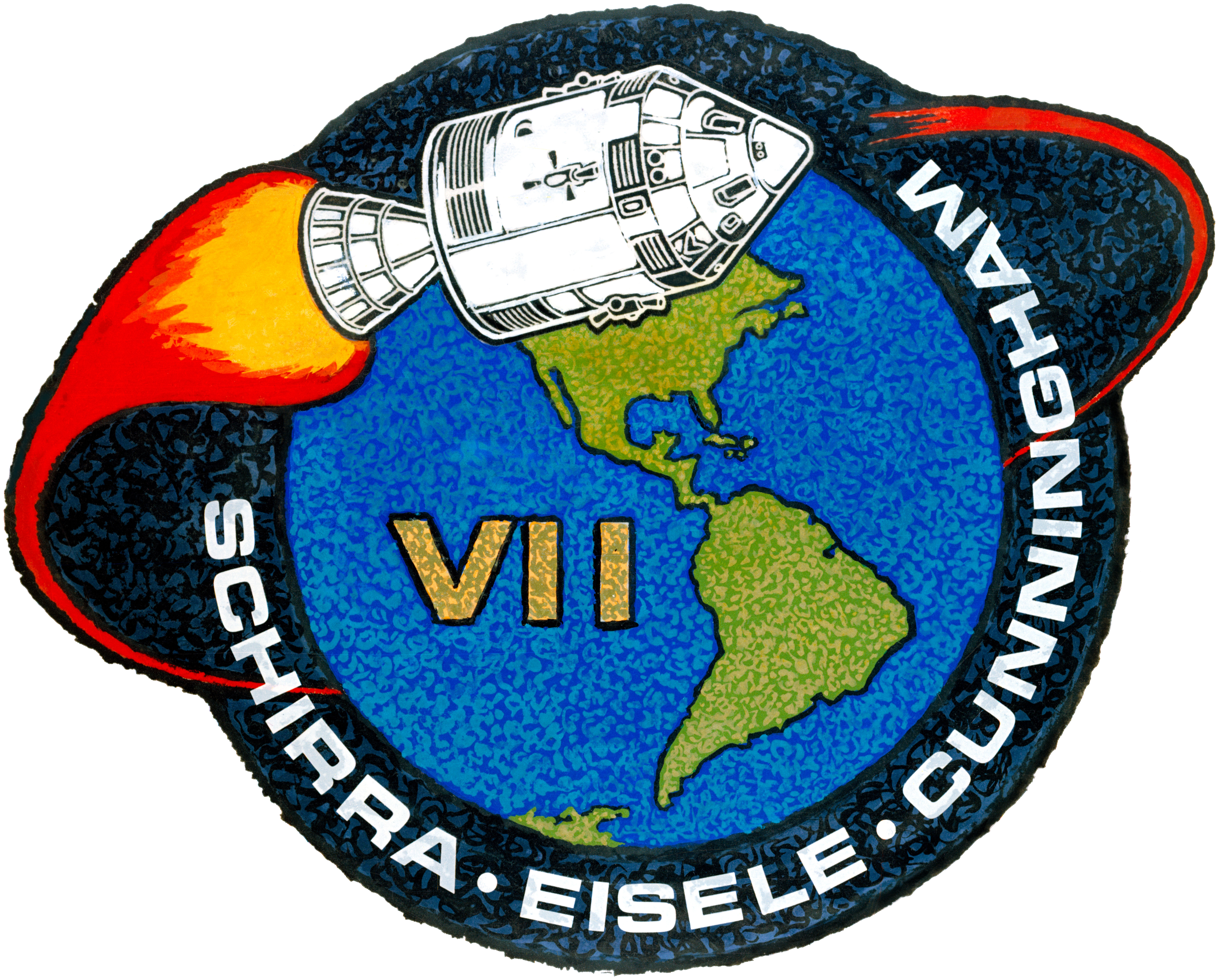
- Mission insignia
- Retired: July 1, 1969

Signature
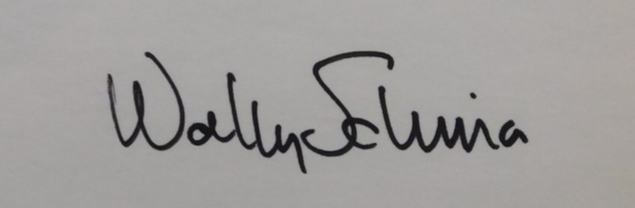

Walter Marty Schirra Jr. (/ʃəˈrɑː/ shə-RAH; March 12, 1923 – May 3, 2007) was an American naval aviator, test pilot, and NASA astronaut. In 1959, he became one of the original seven astronauts chosen for Project Mercury, which was the United States' first effort to put humans into space. On October 3, 1962, he flew the six-orbit, nine-hour, Mercury-Atlas 8 mission, in a spacecraft he nicknamed Sigma 7, becoming the fifth American and ninth human to travel into space. In December 1965, as part of the two-man Gemini program, he achieved the first space rendezvous, station-keeping his Gemini 6A spacecraft within 1 foot (30 cm) of the sister Gemini 7 spacecraft. In October 1968, he commanded Apollo 7, an 11-day low Earth orbit shakedown test of the three-man Apollo Command/Service Module and the first crewed launch for the Apollo program.

Before becoming an astronaut, Schirra graduated with a Bachelor of Science degree from the United States Naval Academy in 1945, and served at sea during World War II. In 1948, he became a naval aviator, served as a fighter pilot and flew 90 combat missions in the Korean War, and then in 1958 he graduated from the U.S. Naval Test Pilot School. Schirra retired from the Navy in 1969 with the rank of captain.

Schirra was the first astronaut to go into space three times, and the only astronaut to have flown into space in the Mercury, Gemini, and Apollo programs. In total, he logged 295 hours and 15 minutes in space. After Apollo 7, he retired as a captain from the U.S. Navy as well as from NASA, subsequently becoming a consultant to CBS News in the network's coverage of following Apollo flights. Schirra joined Walter Cronkite as co-anchor for all seven of NASA's Moon landing missions.

== Early life and education ==
Schirra was born on March 12, 1923, in Hackensack, New Jersey, to a family of aviators. His paternal grandfather Adam Schirra emigrated with his wife Josephina (Marty) Schirra to the United States from Bavaria. Schirra's father, Walter M. Schirra Sr. (1893–1973), who was born in Philadelphia, joined the Royal Canadian Air Force during World War I, and flew bombing and reconnaissance missions over Germany. After the war, he performed as a barnstormer at county fairs in New Jersey, as did Schirra's mother, Florence Shillito Schirra (née Leach; 1898–1982), who performed wing walking stunts.

Schirra Jr. grew up in Oradell, New Jersey, where he attended elementary school and was a First Class Scout in Boy Scout Troop 36. He graduated from Dwight Morrow High School in Englewood, New Jersey, in June 1940 and enrolled in the Newark College of Engineering (now New Jersey Institute of Technology, NJIT), where he was involved in the Reserve Officer Training Corps (ROTC) and the Sigma Pi fraternity. Following the attack on Pearl Harbor in December 1941, Schirra decided to apply to a service academy. His father encouraged him to apply to West Point, but he decided to enroll in the United States Naval Academy instead. He graduated with a Bachelor of Science degree in 1945 after only three years instead of four, as the Naval Academy had a wartime accelerated curriculum.

== Military service ==
After graduating from the Naval Academy, Schirra was commissioned as an ensign in the United States Navy on June 6, 1945. He served during the final months of World War II aboard the large cruiser USS Alaska. Following the Japanese surrender, he returned to the U.S., where the Alaska was decommissioned. He was subsequently stationed to Qingdao and assigned to the amphibious command ship USS Estes. Following his return from China, he began training as a Naval Aviator at Naval Air Station Pensacola, Florida.

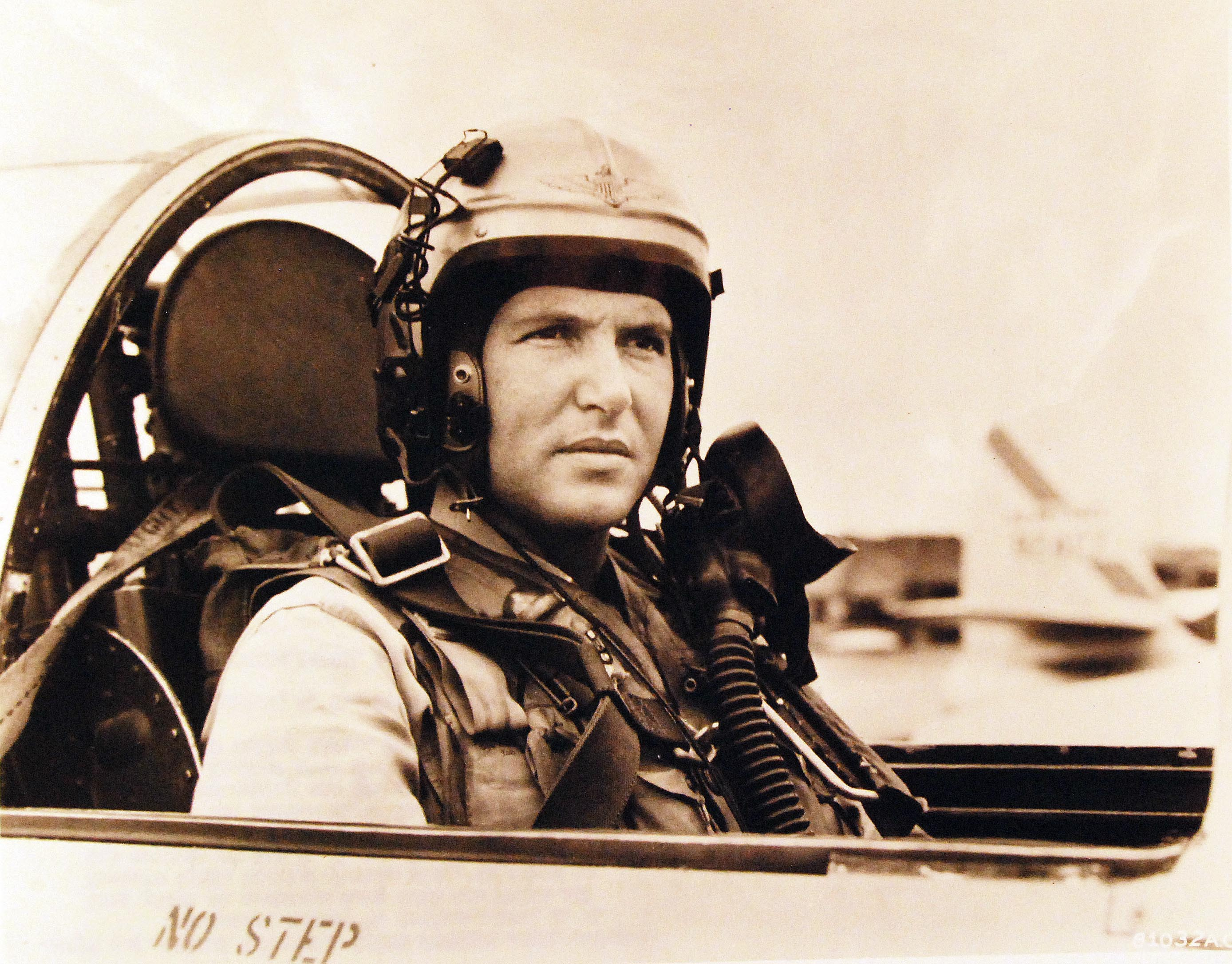
Schirra in the cockpit of his F-84 Thunderjet during Korean War, 1951

After he completed training, Schirra received his naval aviator wings in 1948 and joined Fighter Squadron 71 (VF-71) at Quonset Point, Rhode Island. In VF-71, Schirra flew the F8F Bearcat. After several years of flying the F8F, he attended jet transition training with the F-80 Shooting Star in preparation for his squadron's transition to the jet-powered F9F Panther. Schirra was deployed to the Mediterranean aboard the aircraft carrier USS Midway at the outbreak of the Korean War in June 1950. He applied for an exchange program with the U.S. Air Force to gain combat experience, was selected for the program, and trained to fly on the F-84 Thunderjet.

Schirra was initially deployed with the 154th Fighter-Bomber Squadron to Itazuke Air Force Base in Japan, from where he flew missions into South Korea. As U.S. troops advanced north, the squadron was reassigned to a base in Daegu. In the eight-month deployment, Schirra flew 90 combat missions and downed two MiG-15s.

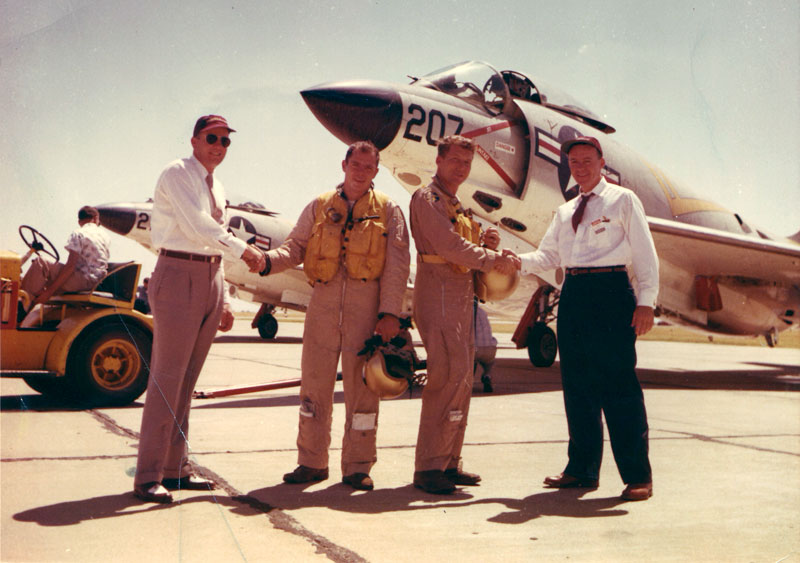
Schirra (2nd from right) and McDonnell Aircraft Design Chief, Dave Lewis at F3H Demon delivery (c. 1958)

After completing his tour in Korea, Schirra became a test pilot at Naval Ordnance Test Station China Lake, California (NOTS). At China Lake, he tested various weapons systems, including becoming the first pilot to fly with and fire the Sidewinder missile. He was assigned to Miramar Naval Air Station to test the newest Navy jet fighter, the F7U Cutlass. He was subsequently assigned to NAS Moffett to begin transition training to the Cutlass, and subsequently the F3H Demon. After a deployment to Asia aboard the aircraft carrier USS Lexington and aviation safety training with the University of Southern California (USC), he was accepted to the U.S. Naval Test Pilot School in 1958.

Schirra was a member of Class 20 at the Naval Test Pilot School, along with future fellow astronauts Jim Lovell and Pete Conrad, where he learned to fly numerous aircraft, including the F4D Skyray, the F11F Tiger, and the F8U Crusader. After graduation, Schirra became a test pilot at Naval Air Station Patuxent River and learned to fly the F4H Phantom to determine if it could become a carrier-based aircraft.

== NASA career ==
=== Project Mercury ===
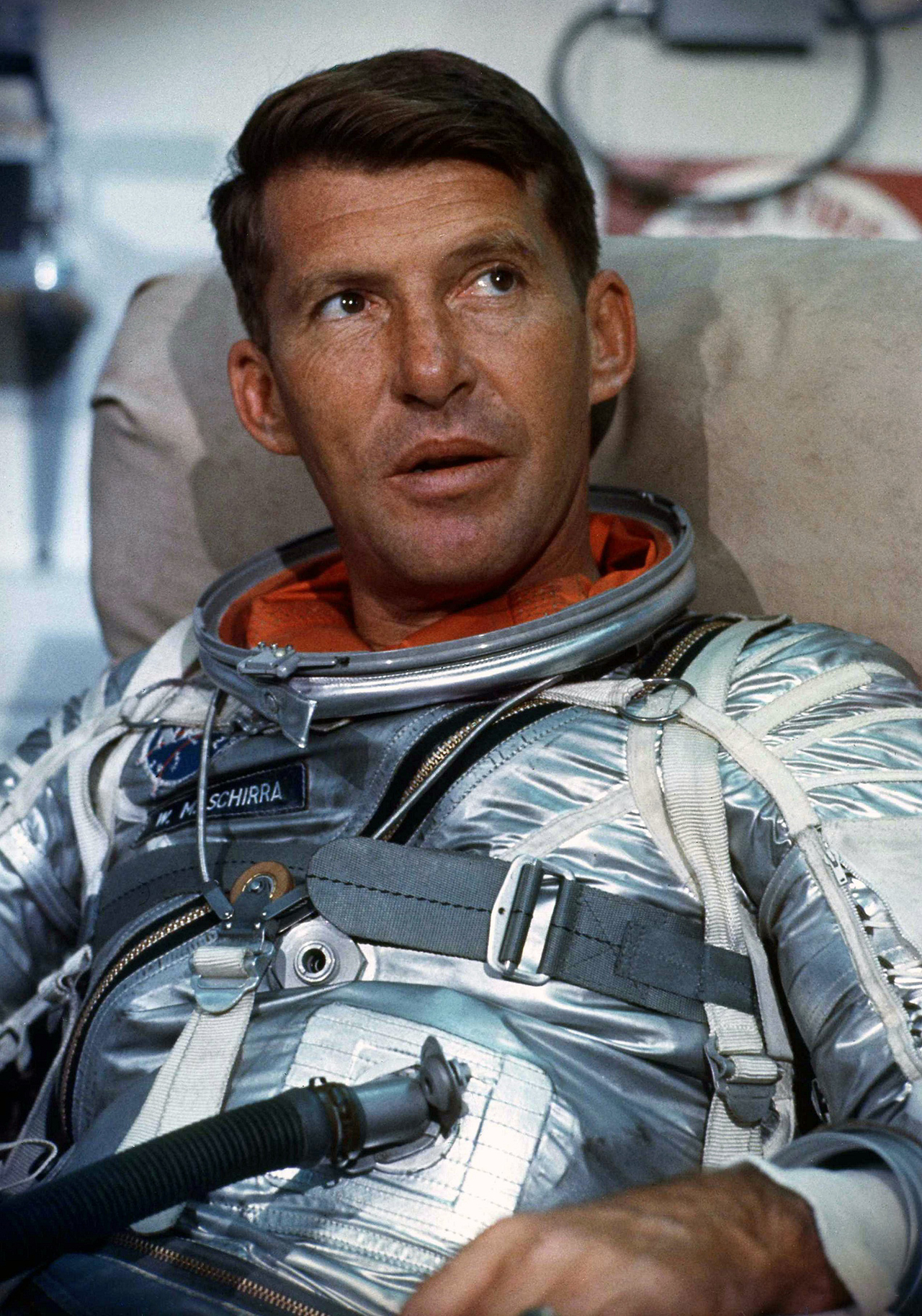
Schirra during training before Mercury-Atlas 8 mission (1962)

In February 1959, Schirra was one of 110 military test pilots selected by their commanding officers as candidates for the newly formed National Aeronautics and Space Administration's Project Mercury, the first U.S. crewed space flight program. Following several rounds of tests, Schirra became a member of the original seven astronauts selected for the program in April 1959.

During the program's development, Schirra's areas of responsibility were the life-support systems and the pressurized flight suit. Additionally, Schirra worked alongside John Glenn in capsule design. Scott Carpenter and Schirra flew F-106 Delta Dart chase planes during Alan Shepard's Freedom 7 suborbital mission. Schirra was initially assigned as Deke Slayton's backup for the second orbital Mercury flight but was replaced with Carpenter when Slayton was grounded. Schirra was instead scheduled for the third orbital flight.

At 7:15 am on October 3, 1962, Schirra lifted off aboard his Mercury flight, named Sigma 7. After a minor trajectory deviation early in flight, Sigma 7 achieved orbit. Once in orbit, Schirra demonstrated manually positioning and maneuvering his spacecraft using a reaction control system. After the navigation issues during Carpenter's Aurora 7 mission, NASA and Schirra focused on the engineering and human factors in manually operating the capsule. Schirra reported rising suit temperatures, reaching a high of 32 °C (90 °F), before he was able to adjust his suit's cooling system manually. After completing his spacecraft tests, Schirra tested his ability to use controls in a zero-gravity environment without sight. Throughout his mission, Schirra demonstrated the ability to act as a backup to automatic controls and manually fly the spacecraft.

After six orbits, Schirra manually aligned his spacecraft over Africa and performed retrofire. Sigma 7 landed 5 miles (8.0 km) from the recovery ship, the aircraft carrier USS Kearsarge, in the central Pacific Ocean. Once Sigma 7 was on deck, Schirra activated the explosive hatch to egress the spacecraft, and received a large bruise, proving that Grissom had not intentionally opened his hatch on Liberty Bell 7. After Schirra returned to the US, he and his family were invited to the Oval Office at the White House to meet President Kennedy on October 16.

=== Project Gemini ===
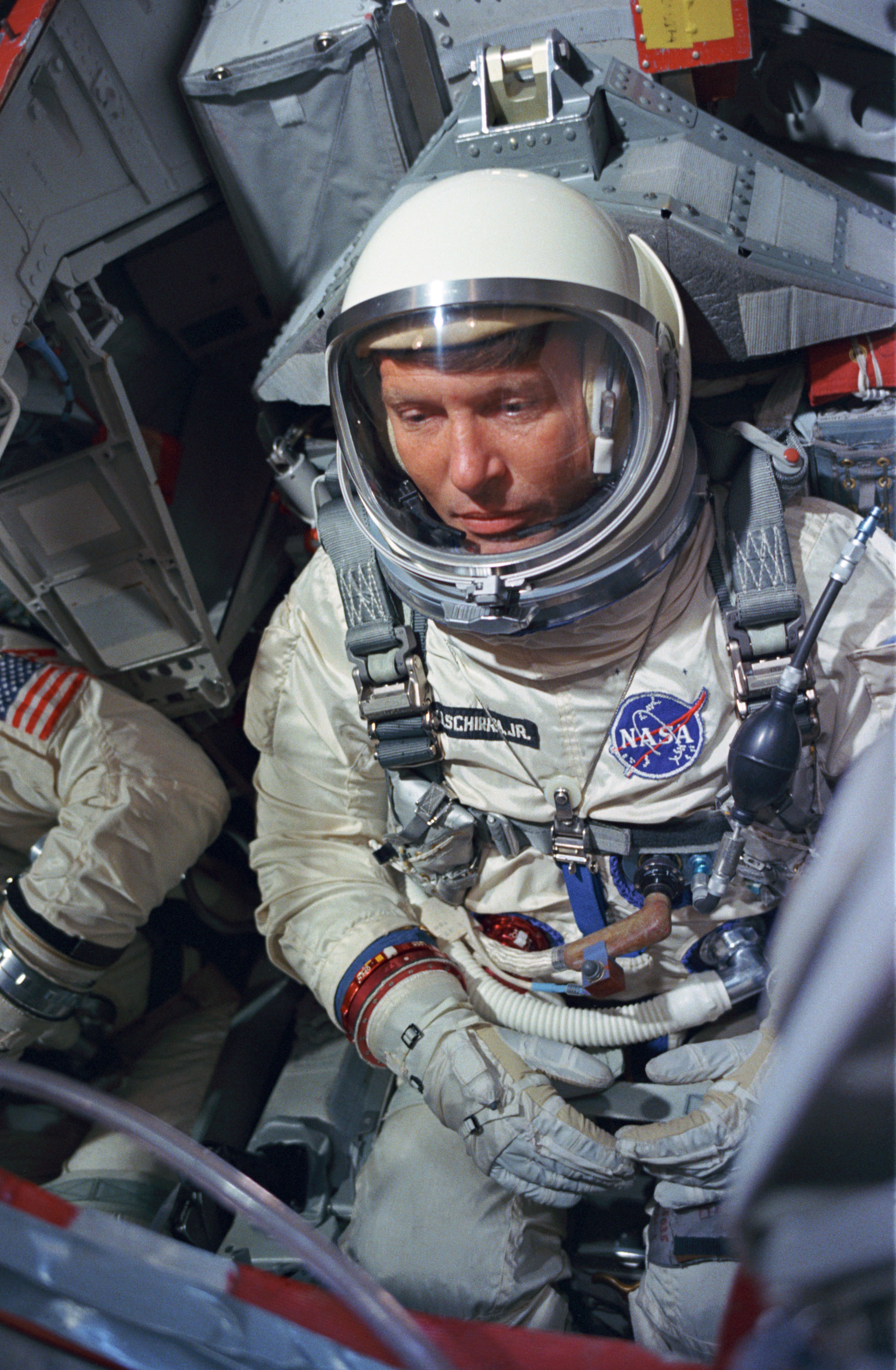
Schirra during a Gemini 6 training simulation (1965)

At the beginning of the Gemini program, Alan Shepard was assigned to command Gemini 3 with Tom Stafford as the pilot, but they were replaced by a backup crew after Shepard was diagnosed with Ménière's disease, a disorder of the inner ear. Schirra and Stafford became the backup crew for the new Gemini 3 crew, Gus Grissom and John Young, and were subsequently scheduled for the Gemini 6 primary crew. Gemini 6 was originally scheduled to perform the first orbital docking with an Agena target vehicle. The Agena vehicle exploded during its launch into orbit on October 25, 1965, while Schirra and Stafford waited in their spacecraft to lift off. Program managers decided that rather than wait for a replacement Agena to be available, they would revise the mission, calling it Gemini 6A and having it attempt a rendezvous with Gemini 7, to be flown by Frank Borman and Jim Lovell. On December 4, 1965, Gemini 7 lifted off to begin its two-week mission.

Gemini 6A prepared to launch on December 12, but its engines shut down less than two seconds after ignition. Despite protocols calling for the astronauts to eject from the spacecraft in the event of an engine shutdown, Schirra chose not to activate his and Stafford's rocket-powered ejection seats, saving them both from probable injuries and a further delay and possible cancellation of the mission. Gemini 6A lifted off on December 15 and successfully rendezvoused with Gemini 7 after five hours of flight. The two spacecraft maneuvered to within one foot of each other and kept station for 5 hours. Following the rendezvous, Gemini 6A deorbited on December 16 and was recovered in the Atlantic ocean southeast of Cape Canaveral by the USS Wasp.

While on the Gemini mission, Schirra played a Christmas practical joke on the flight controllers by first reporting a mock UFO (implying Santa Claus) sighting, then playing "Jingle Bells" on a four-hole Hohner harmonica he had smuggled on board, accompanied by Stafford on sleigh bells.

=== Apollo program ===
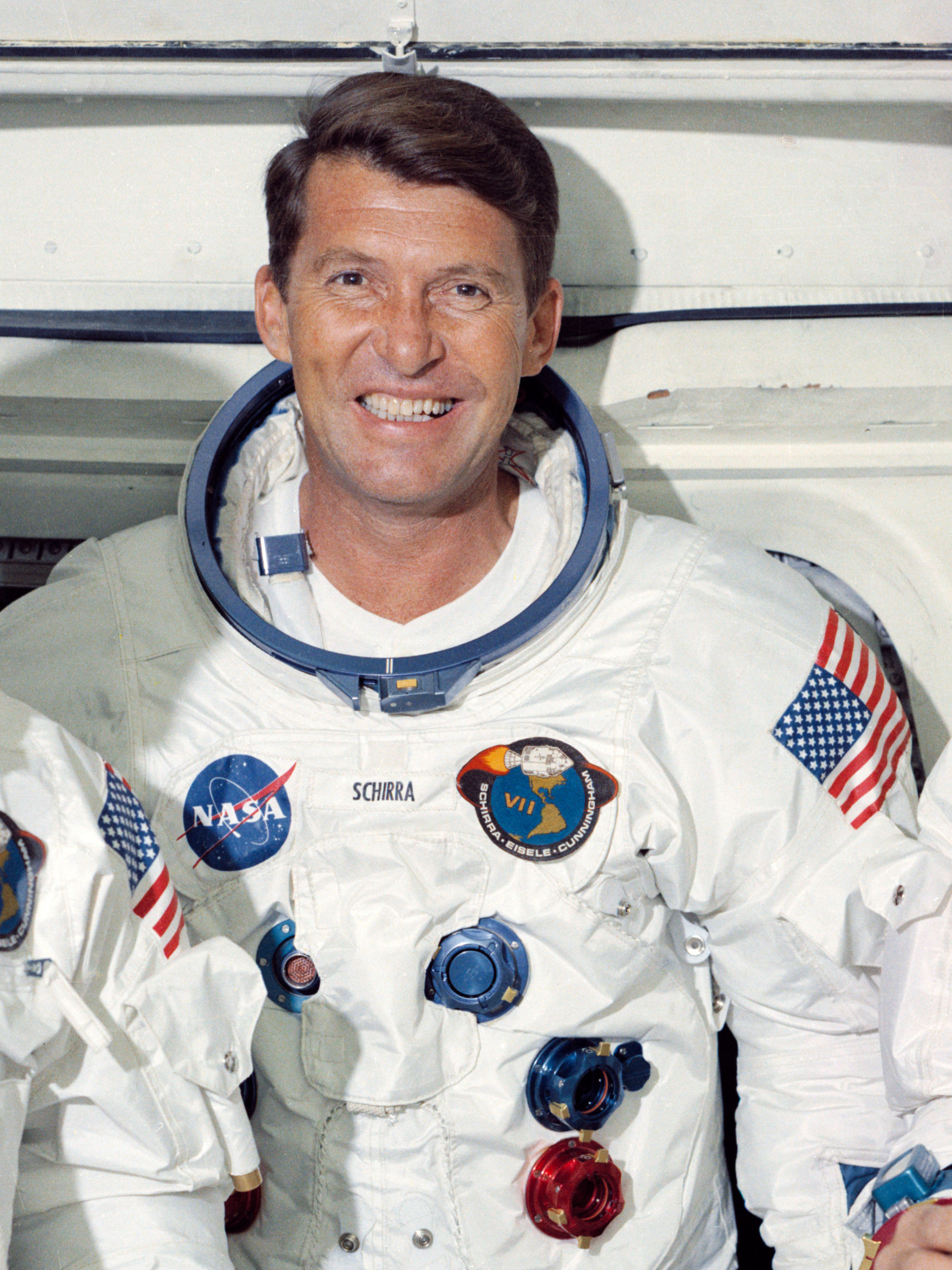
Schirra as the Commander of Apollo 7 crew (1968)

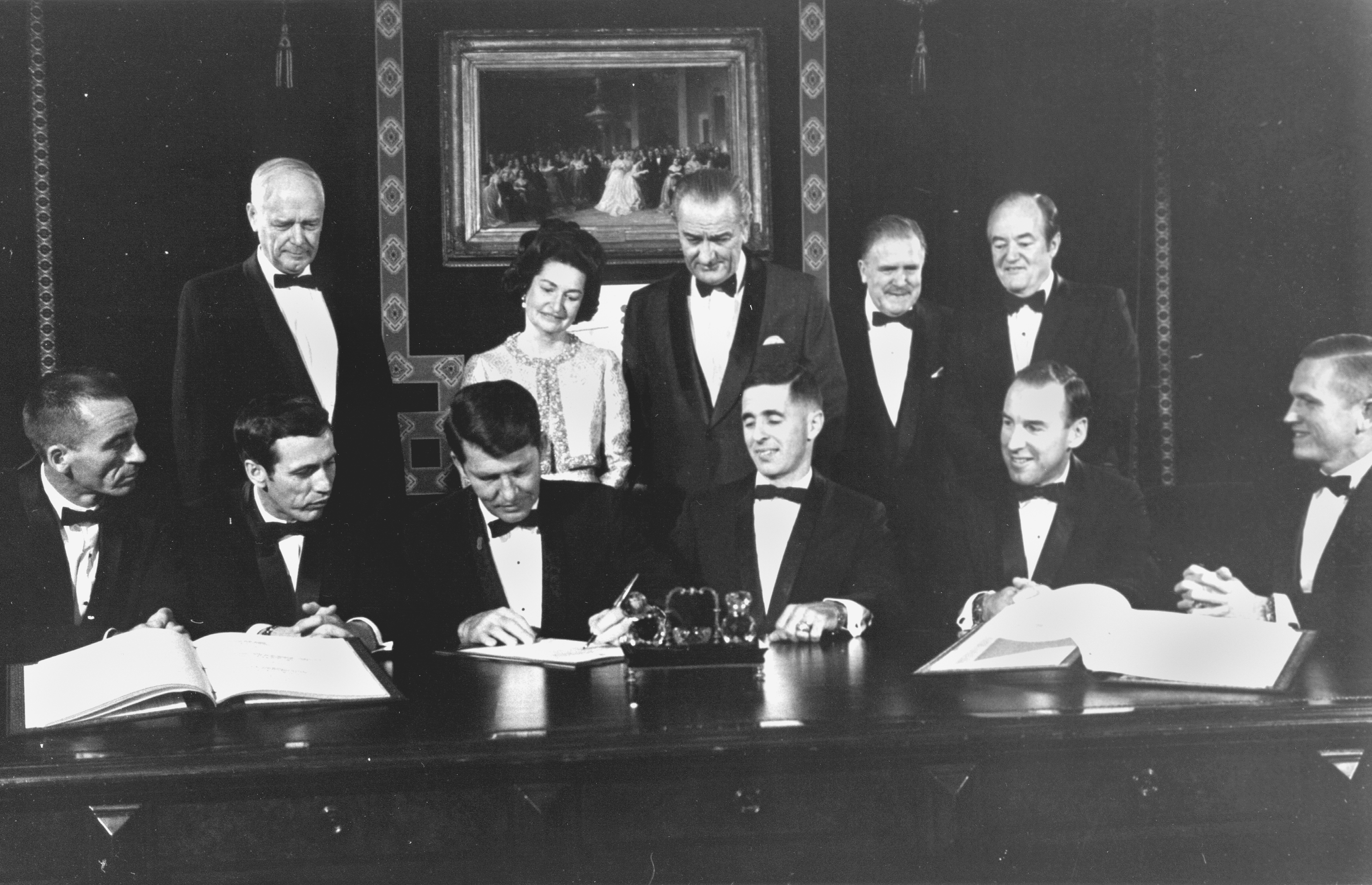
Schirra (sitting 3rd from left), signing a commemorative document, with his Apollo 7 crewmates, Apollo 8 crew, Charles Lindbergh, First Lady Lady Bird Johnson, President Johnson, NASA Administrator Webb and Vice President Humphrey (1968)

In mid-1966, Schirra was assigned to command a three-man Apollo crew with Donn F. Eisele and R. Walter Cunningham to make the second crewed flight test of the Apollo Command/Service Module, with a mission profile identical to Apollo 1. Schirra argued against a repeat mission, and his crew became the backup crew for Gus Grissom, Ed White, and Roger Chaffee. Schirra's crew conducted tests in the command module on January 26, 1967, and were en route to Houston the next day when Grissom and his crew were killed in a fire during a test. Schirra's crew became the prime crew of the first crewed flight. This became Apollo 7 in the program's revised mission numbering plan, and was delayed until the fall of 1968 while safety improvements were made to the Command Module.

Schirra had gained a sense of security from having Guenter Wendt, a McDonnell Aircraft employee, as the pad leader responsible for the spacecraft's launch readiness. As the Apollo contractor was now North American Aviation, Wendt was no longer pad leader. After the Apollo 1 accident, Schirra felt so strongly he wanted none other than Wendt as pad leader for his Apollo flight, that he convinced Deke Slayton and North American's launch operations manager Bastian "Buzz" Hello to hire Wendt as Apollo 7 pad leader. Wendt remained pad leader for the remainder of the Apollo and Skylab programs, and stayed on with NASA into the Space Shuttle program before retiring. However, Schirra was prevented from naming his spacecraft Phoenix in honor of the Apollo 1 crew, because some believed that its nickname as a metaphor for "fire" might be misunderstood.

Apollo 7 was launched on October 11, 1968, making Schirra the first person to fly in space three times. Prior to launch, Schirra had objected because of high winds, which could have injured the astronauts in the event of an abort within the first minute of the mission. After reaching orbit, the Apollo 7 CSM performed space rendezvous and docking exercises with the S-IVB upper stage to simulate retrieving the Apollo Lunar Module. On the second day of the mission, the crew conducted the first live television pictures publicly broadcast from inside a crewed spacecraft. (Note: An experimental TV transmission had been made during Gordon Cooper's Mercury flight in 1963, but this was not broadcast to the public.)

During the mission, Schirra became sick with a head cold, which he passed to Eisele. Anticipating issues with congestion inside of a sealed spacesuit, Schirra proposed to Mission Control that they would not wear their helmets during reentry. Despite a request from Chris Kraft and Deke Slayton to wear helmets during reentry, Schirra, Eisele, and Cunningham refused and performed reentry without them. Apollo 7 landed southeast of Bermuda on October 22, 1968.

Prior to the Apollo 7 launch, Schirra had decided to retire after the flight, and left the NASA Astronaut Corps on July 1, 1969. Schirra's last assignment as an astronaut was to conduct the investigation into Neil Armstrong's Lunar Landing Research Vehicle crash, which he attributed to a mechanical failure and recommended suspending training with the vehicle. On the same date, Schirra retired from the Navy with the rank of Captain.

== Post-NASA career ==
=== Television career ===
A combination of pseudoephedrine decongestant with triprolidine antihistamine was the cold medicine carried on board the Apollo missions and prescribed by the flight surgeon. Years later when this became available over the counter as Actifed, the makers of Actifed hired Schirra as a television commercial spokesman, based on the notoriety of his Apollo 7 in-space head cold.

During later Apollo missions, he served as a consultant to CBS News from 1969 to 1975. He joined Walter Cronkite to co-anchor the network's coverage of the seven Moon landing missions, starting with Apollo 11 (joined by Arthur C. Clarke) and including the ill-fated Apollo 13.

=== Business career ===
Following his NASA career, Schirra became president and a director of the financial and leasing company Regency Investors Incorporated. He left Regency Investors to form Environmental Control Company and served as the company's chairman and chief executive officer from 1970 to 1973. The company merged with SERNCO Incorporated in 1973. Schirra started as vice-chairman, but was elected as chairman of the board later that year. He also worked to develop an Alaskan oil pipeline and was a member of an advisory board for U.S. national parks in the Department of the Interior from 1973 to 1985.

In January 1979, Schirra founded Schirra Enterprises, and worked as a consultant until 1980. He worked for the Belgian Consulate for Colorado and New Mexico, from 1971 to 1984, and was a board member of several corporations including Electromedics, Finalco, Kimberly-Clark, Net Air International, Rocky Mountain Airlines, and Johns-Manville Corporation. Schirra was president of the energy development company Prometheus from 1980 to 1981. In 1984, he was among the surviving Mercury astronauts who established the Mercury Seven Foundation, now known as the Astronaut Scholarship Foundation, to award college scholarships to science and engineering students.

=== Writing career ===
Schirra, along with the rest of the Mercury Seven, co-authored the 1962 book We Seven, detailing the training and development of the Mercury program. Along with Richard N. Billings, Schirra released his autobiography Schirra's Space in 1988. In 1995, he co-authored the book Wildcats to Tomcats: The Tailhook Navy with Barrett Tillman and fellow Navy Captains Richard L. (Zeke) Cormier, and Phil Wood. It describes five decades of Naval aviation, including accounts of combat tours in World War II, Korea, and Vietnam. In 2005, he co-authored the book The Real Space Cowboys with Ed Buckbee. The book is an account of the Mercury Seven astronauts. It follows them through the process of selection for the program, their entire careers, and into retirement. Schirra was also a contributor to the 2007 book, In the Shadow of the Moon, which was his final authored work.

== Personal life ==
Shortly after being commissioned in the Navy, Schirra began dating Josephine Cook "Jo" Fraser. Schirra and Fraser were married on February 23, 1946. They had two children, Walter Marty III and Suzanne Karen, born in 1950 and 1957, respectively. Jo Schirra died April 27, 2015, at the age of 91.

== Death ==
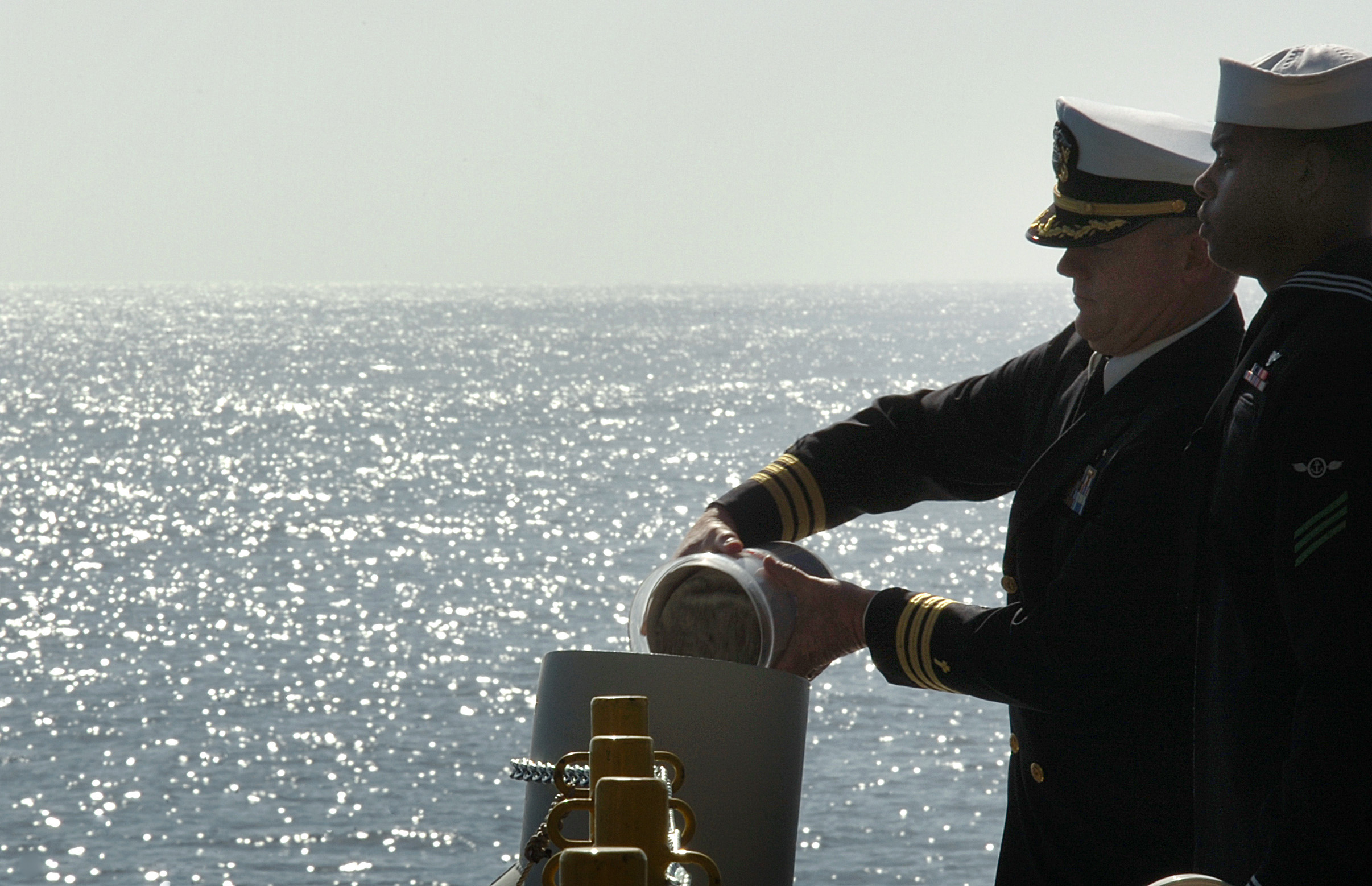
Commander Lee Axtell releases the ashes of Wally Schirra during his burial at sea (2008).

Schirra died on May 3, 2007, of a heart attack while undergoing treatment for abdominal cancer at Scripps Green Hospital (currently The Heart Center at Scripps) in San Diego, California. He was 84 years old. A memorial service for Schirra was held on May 22 at Fort Rosecrans National Cemetery in California. The ceremony concluded with a three-volley salute and a flyover by three F/A-18s. Schirra was cremated and his ashes were committed to the sea on February 11, 2008. The burial at sea ceremony was held aboard the Nimitz-class aircraft carrier USS Ronald Reagan and his ashes were released by Commander Lee Axtell, the command chaplain aboard (see photo).

== Awards and honors ==
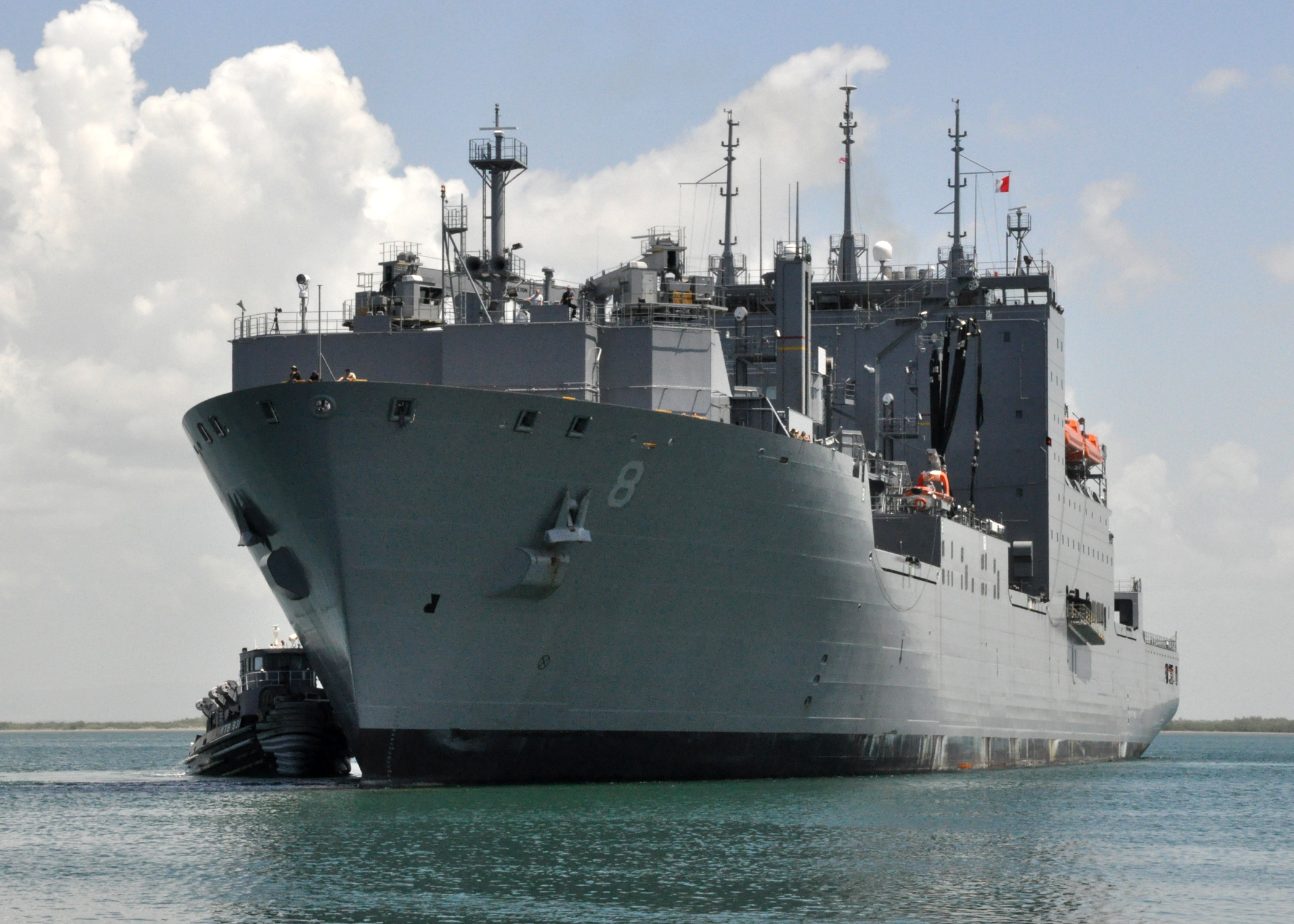
USNS Wally Schirra (Lewis and Clark-class dry cargo ship) was named after Schirra (2010).

Schirra's numerous military decorations include three Air Medals and three NASA Distinguished Service Medals, including one posthumously. His first NASA Distinguished Service Medal was for his Mercury flight, and the second for his Gemini 6A flight. He was also awarded the NASA Exceptional Service Medal, the American Campaign Medal, the Asiatic-Pacific Campaign Medal, the World War II Victory Medal, the Navy Occupation Medal with "ASIA" clasp, the China Service Medal, and the Korean Service Medal. Additionally, he received several international awards, including a Korean Presidential Unit Citation, the United Nations Korea Medal, and the Korean War Service Medal. Schirra has also received civilian aviation awards, including the AIAA Award (1963), the Harmon Trophy (1965), the Kitty Hawk Award, and the Golden Key Award.

When Schirra received his Navy Astronaut Wings from Secretary Fred Korth, the Navy's uniform guidance did not specify whether it should be worn alongside or instead of his naval aviator wings. Schirra decided to wear his astronaut wings above his ribbons, and the aviator wings below them. Schirra received the Navy Distinguished Service Medal for commanding Apollo 7. He was also awarded a Distinguished Flying Cross for escorting B-29 bombers during the Korean War, a gold star for his Sigma 7 flight, and a second gold star for flying on Gemini 6A. Schirra, a fellow of Society of Experimental Test Pilots (SETP), received its Iven C. Kincheloe Award in 1963 along with the other six Mercury astronauts. In 1962, he and the other Mercury astronauts received the Robert J. Collier Trophy, which was typically given to engineers and inventors.

Schirra was a 33rd Degree Mason and part of the American Institute of Aeronautics and Astronautics, as well as a fellow of the American Astronautical Society. Schirra received Honorary Doctorates of Science from three colleges and universities: Lafayette College (for Astronautical Engineering), the University of Southern California, and his alma mater the Newark College of Engineering (for Astronautics). Schirra was inducted into the International Air & Space Hall of Fame (1970), the International Space Hall of Fame (1981), the National Aviation Hall of Fame (1986), the U.S. Astronaut Hall of Fame (1990), and the New Jersey Hall of Fame. The USNS Wally Schirra (T-AKE-8), a Lewis and Clark-class dry cargo ship named for Schirra, was christened and launched March 8, 2009. A street is named after Schirra in Upper Dublin, Pennsylvania, and a park in Oradell, New Jersey. There is a Walter M. Schirra Elementary School in Old Bridge Township, New Jersey.

== In film and television ==
- 1978 TV: WKRP in Cincinnati
- 1983 film: The Right Stuff – played by Lance Henriksen
- 1995 film: Apollo 13 – he appears onscreen as himself with CBS News anchor Walter Cronkite in archive news footage
- 1998 HBO miniseries: From the Earth to the Moon – played by Mark Harmon
- 2015 ABC series: The Astronaut Wives Club – played by Aaron McCusker

== See also ==
- List of spaceflight records

== Bibliography ==
- Wally Schirra & Richard N. Billings, "Schirra's Space", 1988 ISBN 1-55750-792-9
- Wally Schirra, Richard L. Cormier, and Phillip R. Wood with Barrett Tillman, Wildcats to Tomcats, Phalanx, 1995. ISBN 1-883809-07-X
- Robert Godwin, Ed. "Sigma 7: The NASA Mission Reports", 2003 ISBN 1-894959-01-9
- Robert Godwin, Ed. "Gemini 6: The NASA Mission Reports", 2000 ISBN 1-896522-61-0
- Robert Godwin, Ed. "Apollo 7: The NASA Mission Reports", 2000 ISBN 1-896522-64-5
- Ed Buckbee with Wally Schirra, "The Real Space Cowboys", 2005 ISBN 1-894959-21-3
