= Günter Wendt =

Pad leader for Mercury, Gemini, Apollo, and Skylab space launches

Guenter Wendt
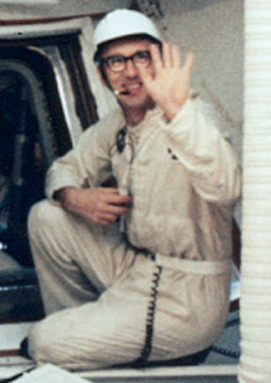
- Wendt seated in the Command Module Hatch
- Born: Günter F. Wendt; August 28, 1923; Berlin, Germany
- Died: May 3, 2010 (aged 86); Merritt Island, Florida, U.S.
- Citizenship: United States
- Engineering career
- Discipline: Mechanical engineering
- Practice name: Launch pad leader
- Employer(s): McDonnell Aircraft, North American Rockwell
- Projects: Mercury, Gemini, Apollo, Skylab

Günter F. Wendt (also spelled Guenter Wendt; August 28, 1923 – May 3, 2010) was a German-born American mechanical engineer noted for his work in the U.S. human spaceflight program. An employee of McDonnell Aircraft and later North American Aviation, he was in charge of the spacecraft close-out crews at the launch pads for the entire Mercury and Gemini programs (1961–1966) and the crewed phases of the Apollo, Skylab, and Apollo–Soyuz programs (1968–1975) at the Kennedy Space Center (KSC). His official title was Pad Leader.

In NASA documentary films, Wendt appears as the bespectacled, thin man in a bow-tie and white cap and coat, usually standing near the hatch, clipboard in hand; or bending over seated crew members, pulling their safety harnesses snug for launch.

== Biography ==
=== Early years ===
A native of Berlin, Germany, Wendt studied mechanical engineering and then fought for Nazi Germany during World War II, serving as a flight engineer aboard Luftwaffe night fighters. He also completed a four-year apprenticeship during the war learning aircraft building.

After the Allied victory, there were few job opportunities for engineers in Germany under the Occupation, so Wendt decided to emigrate to the United States in 1949 and joined his divorced father in St. Louis, Missouri. Defense contractor McDonnell Aircraft was interested in employing Wendt as an engineer, but could not hire a German citizen since the company was working on U.S. Navy contracts. Wendt found a job as a truck mechanic (though he had never worked on trucks) and within one year became shop supervisor. He obtained his U.S. citizenship in 1955 and shortly thereafter was hired by McDonnell.

=== McDonnell Aircraft ===
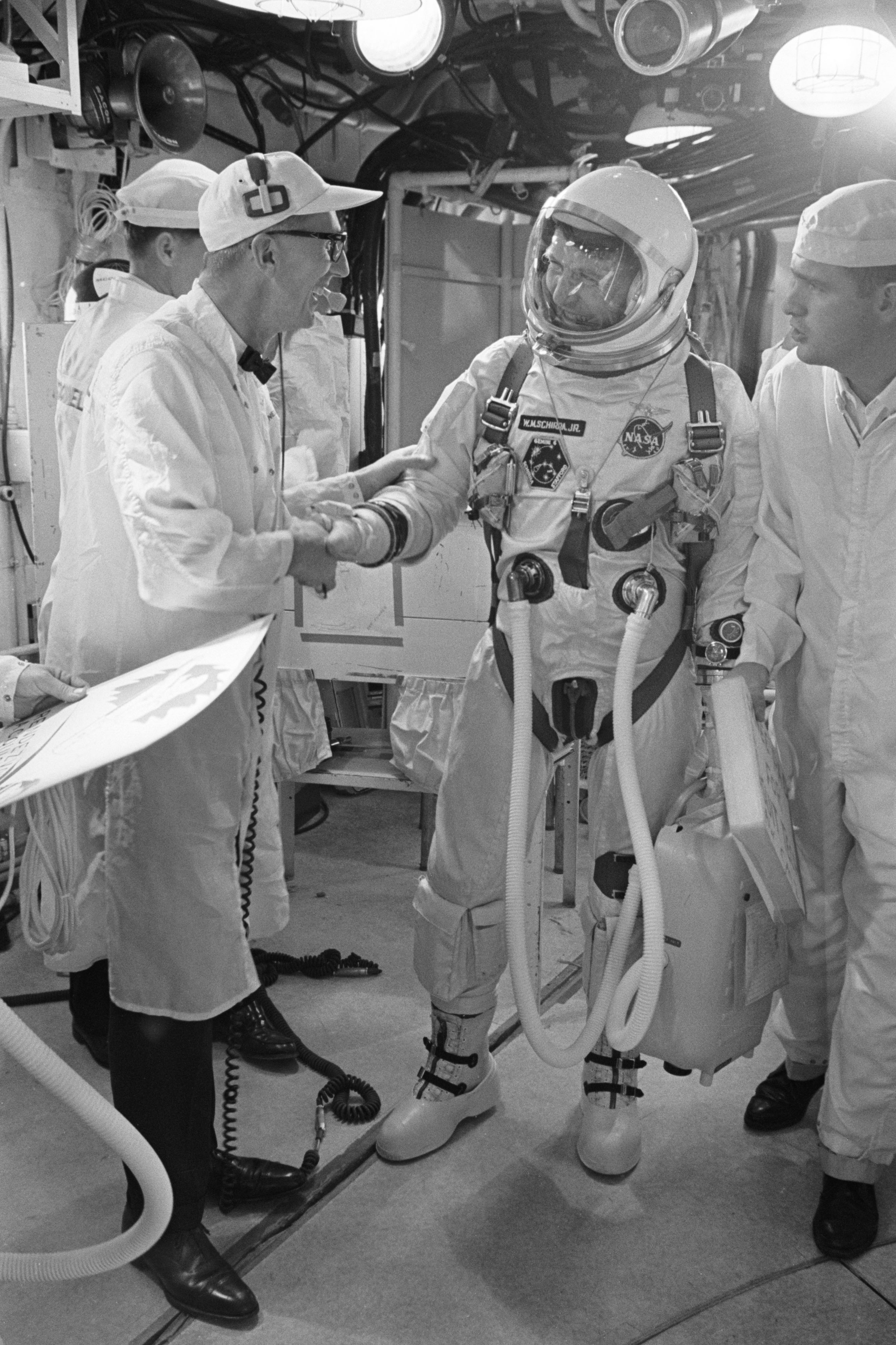
Wendt offers his best wishes to astronaut Walter M. Schirra Jr., command pilot of the 1965 Gemini 6A mission, as he arrives in the white room atop Pad 19.

As a McDonnell engineer, Wendt supervised spacecraft launch pad preparations at Cape Canaveral during the Mercury and Gemini crewed space programs beginning with the flight of Ham the chimpanzee in 1961. He came to be regarded as a familiar presence to the astronauts, serving as the final face that they would see and offering humorous remarks to decrease the stress that the astronauts felt.

Wendt's was the final word for the launch tower white room team responsible for loading and securing the crewmen, ensuring that spacecraft instrumentation, switches and controls were correct for launch, and securing the hatch. Nobody touched anything without his permission.

There is no reason to say I am narrow-minded. Just do it my way and you will have no problem at all.

— Wendt

Once a stubborn engineer intended to personally make a spacecraft change, with or without Wendt's permission. Wendt called security to have him removed.

The [security] guy comes up on the elevator and he says [to the engineer], 'You like me to put handcuffs on you, or are you going to go by yourself?' The engineer dropped his jaw, but he left. Maybe this system is wrong, but I have had pretty good success with it. If I don't do a good job, I get out. I can't compromise.

— Wendt

Astronaut Pete Conrad, known for his sense of humor, once said of Wendt:

It's easy to get along with Guenter. All you have to do is agree with him.

Mercury astronaut John Glenn fondly nicknamed Wendt "der Führer of der Launch Pad" (from his German-accented English) for his efficient, disciplined, yet good-humored pad crew leadership. His strict approach to configuration control of the equipment and commitment to safety was welcomed by the astronauts, and earned him their respect. Before Glenn's Mercury flight, Wendt tried to reassure Glenn's wife:

Annie, we cannot guarantee you safe return of John. This would be lying. Nobody can guarantee you this – there is too much machinery involved. The one thing I can guarantee you is that when the spacecraft leaves it is in the best possible condition for a launch. If anything should happen to the spacecraft, I would like to be able to come and tell you about the accident and look you straight in the eye and say, 'We did the best we could.' My conscience then is clear and there is where my guideline is.

In January 1967, Wendt, still with McDonnell (soon to become McDonnell Douglas), was supervising the test range in Titusville, Florida. Since NASA changed contractors for the Apollo program to North American Aviation (soon to become North American Rockwell), he was not involved with the Apollo 1 spacecraft, in which a cabin fire caused the deaths of Gus Grissom, Ed White, and Roger Chaffee. After the accident, several people expressed to him the wish that he had been there, as if he might have caught the fatal problem in time to prevent the tragedy. But Wendt himself did not presume to believe this:

... maybe it was meant for me not to be there because I would have taken it very hard.

=== North American Rockwell ===
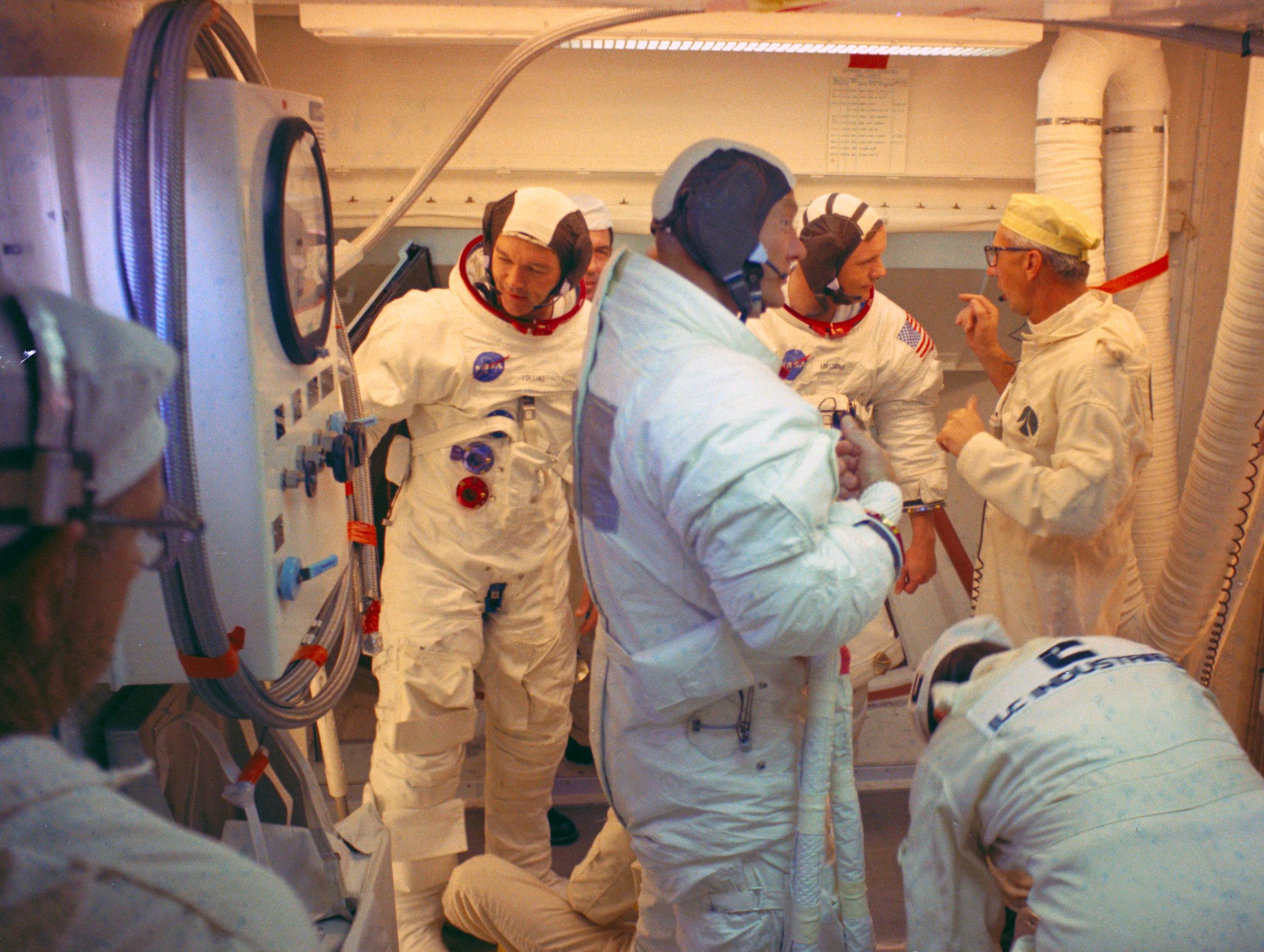
Wendt (right, standing) with the Apollo 11 crew (Collins, Aldrin, Armstrong) in the LC-39A white room

Grissom's backup and replacement on the Apollo 7 flight, Mercury and Gemini veteran Wally Schirra, insisted on having Wendt back in charge of the pad crew for his flight, and convinced chief astronaut Deke Slayton to get North American to hire him. Schirra personally convinced North American's vice-president and general manager for launch operations, Bastian "Buz" Hello, to change Wendt's shift from midnight to daytime so he could be pad leader for Apollo 7.

During the Apollo 7 liftoff, crew member Donn Eisele said to the ground, "I vonder vere Guenter Vendt" (In the German language, the letter "w" is pronounced as "v" is in English, see German orthography).

Crew members of the other Apollo missions shared an equally high regard for Wendt, and he stayed on with the Pad Leader title through the Skylab and Apollo–Soyuz missions.

He continued to work at KSC into the early Space Shuttle flights until he retired in 1989.

=== Later years ===
Wendt's wife, Herma, died in 1993 after more than 40 years of marriage.

Wendt later served as a technical consultant for several TV and movie features, and co-wrote his 2001 autobiography, The Unbroken Chain, with Russell Still (Apogee Books, ISBN 1-896522-84-X). He remained a personal friend of many early astronauts.

Wendt stated in a 2004 interview with Parade magazine that he would occasionally receive fan mail for Cheers actor George Wendt.

Wendt died on May 3, 2010, at his home in Merritt Island, Florida, following congestive heart failure and a stroke. His survivors include his three daughters, Irina Thompson, Norma Wendt, and Sandra Taylor; five grandchildren; a great-grandson; and a great-great-grandson.

== Awards and honors ==
Wendt is a recipient of NASA's Letter of Appreciation award, the Silver Snoopy award and several Group Achievement awards. He received a NASA Lifetime Achievement Award in 2009. The main-belt asteroid 429033 Günterwendt, discovered by German astronomer Felix Hormuth at Calar Alto Observatory 2009, was named in his memory. The official naming citation was published by the Minor Planet Center on November 14, 2016 (M.P.C. 102259).

== On film and television ==
Wendt has been portrayed in a number of movies and television shows about the US space program, including:

- Apollo 13, 1995, played by Endre Hules – While being fitted into his space suit, astronaut Jim Lovell (played by Tom Hanks) chats with Wendt in a mock German accent, and repeats Eisele's "I vonder vere Guenter Vendt" line from Apollo 7.
- From the Earth to the Moon, 1998, played by Max Wright. Wendt also portrayed an unnamed engineer in one episode.
- In Search of Liberty Bell 7, Discovery Channel documentary, 1999 – Wendt participated in the expedition to raise Gus Grissom's sunken Mercury capsule.
- First Man, 2018, played by Steve Coulter.

Wendt has several moments of screen time in the 1998 documentary One Giant Leap.
