= Robert Godwin =

British author (born 1958)

Robert Godwin (born 1958 in England) is a British author who has written about rock music and spaceflight. Early in his career he was a rock music impresario who managed a venue in Burlington, Ontario, and founded Griffin Music.

== Personal information ==
After attending Ellesmere College in Shropshire, where he studied Mathematics and Physics, he emigrated to Canada. Olympic rower Jack Godwin and New Zealand military aviator James Gowing Godwin were cousins. Lt. Sidney Godwin, who rode with Marshall's Horse, was his great-grandfather.

== Music business ==
In 1981, he managed the Orient Express night club, a venue in Burlington, Ontario, where many world class rock acts performed including Rick Derringer, Steppenwolf, Joe Perry and Mountain. In 1983 Godwin turned to music management and assisted in the recording and production of albums by Michael White & The White. In 1987 he started the process to establish his own record label Griffin Music and his own book publishing company, Collector's Guide Publishing. In 1990 the first album by Michael White was released on Griffin Music. Over the next few years Griffin would release many classic rock acts' back-catalogs through Griffin, notably, the BBC in Concert series, Anderson Bruford Wakeman Howe, David Bowie, Motörhead, Thin Lizzy, Mike Oldfield, Olivia Newton-John, Hawkwind, and Nazareth.

== Author ==
In 1984, Godwin wrote The Illustrated Led Zeppelin Collection a book for Led Zeppelin collectors. Books he authored between 1987 and 2007 include The Illustrated Collector's Guide to Led Zeppelin, The Illustrated Collector's Guide to Hawkwind, The Illustrated Collector's Guide to Kate Bush, Apollo 11 The First Men on the Moon, Project Apollo The Test Program, Project Apollo Exploring the Moon, Mars, The Lunar Exploration Scrapbook, Russian Spacecraft, Space Shuttle Fact Archive and The Making of Led Zeppelin IV. In 2005 Godwin co-authored Saturn with Alan Lawrie. The book won the Sir Arthur Clarke Award for Best Presentation Written in 2006. In 2013 he co-authored a biography of Arthur C. Clarke with Fred Clarke, brother of Arthur.

In 2014 he co-authored 2001 The Heritage and Legacy of the Space Odyssey with Frederick I. Ordway III, who was technical adviser to Stanley Kubrick for the film 2001 A Space Odyssey. Godwin also contributed feature articles to such publications as Goldmine (magazine) and Boeing Employee Times

In October 2015, Godwin wrote and published The First Scientific Concept of Rockets for Space Travel, an essay in which he asserted that a Scottish Presbyterian Minister and Canadian University Principal named William Leitch was the first scientist to determine, for the correct reasons, that rockets were the best method for powering space flight. Godwin's essay was publicly endorsed by Frank H. Winter, retired Curator of Rocketry at the Smithsonian Air and Space Museum, and by David Baker, editor of the British Interplanetary Society's magazine, Spaceflight. Leitch's proposal for rockets appeared in September 1861 in the magazine Good Words, effectively pre-dating the modern proponents of rocketry, such as Robert Hutchings Goddard and Konstantin Tsiolkovsky by more than three decades. In late 2016 Godwin released his findings as a book entitled William Leitch - Presbyterian Scientist & The Concept of Rocket Space Flight 1854-1864. Godwin co-authored Outpost in Orbit - An Oral and Pictorial History of the International Space Station with David Shayler in 2018. The book was written in cooperation with the ISS office at the Johnson Space Center under a NASA Space Agreement. Godwin's book Manned Lunar Landing & Return, released in March 2019, told the story of Project MALLAR, the 1959 plan for a crewed lunar landing created by Conrad Lau, head of Advanced Projects at the Chance Vought Aircraft Company's Astronautics Division. Lau's report proposed a three module spacecraft system which would take two people to the lunar surface and use a technique known as lunar orbit rendezvous to return them to Earth. Godwin showed that Abe Silverstein, a senior NASA manager was given the report on 12 January 1960, and two weeks later instructed NASA's Advance Vehicle team to adopt this design for the Apollo spacecraft.

== Print publishing ==
Between 1987 and 1998 Collector's Guide Publishing released books on many different rock artists including Pink Floyd, Led Zeppelin, The Beatles, Elvis Presley, Kate Bush, Alice Cooper, Wishbone Ash and Kiss.

In 1998, at the invitation of astronaut Buzz Aldrin, Godwin would begin his imprint Apogee Books.

Between 1998 and 2018 Apogee Books published over 150 book titles about space flight with contributions from Buzz Aldrin, Sir Arthur C. Clarke, Tom Hanks, Ron Howard, David R. Scott, Harrison Schmitt and Wernher von Braun.

=== Editing ===
Godwin has edited dozens of books including the NASA Mission Reports series (41 titles as of 2024), Dyna-Soar Hypersonic Strategic Weapons System, Rocket & Space Corporation Energia, X-15, The Conquest of Space, Columbia Accident Investigation Report as well as a series of vintage science fiction books in 2006 under the Apogee Science Fiction imprint. Titles with forewords by Godwin and editorial content include Garrett P. Serviss' Edison's Conquest of Mars and A Columbus of Space, Hugo Gernsback's Baron Münchhausen's New Scientific Adventures, Otto Willi Gail's By Rocket to the Moon, and George Griffith's The World Peril of 1910, A Honeymoon in Space and Around the World in 65 Days. In his 2006 reprint of The World Peril of 1910, Godwin was the first to draw attention to Griffith's invention of the countdown for a space launch. The series also included the first uncut English edition of Wernher von Braun's Project Mars manuscript.

== TV/Video/Web ==
Godwin's first appearance on television was in 1983 as a guest of Elwy Yost on TV Ontario's Saturday Night at the Movies. In 1994 his U.S. based company Griffin Video commercially released a VHS tape of the Classic Pictures space documentary "One Small Step", narrated by actor Tom Baker. For his 1999 book Apollo 11 The NASA Mission Reports he created the first ever seamless QTVR digital panoramas of the Apollo lunar surface photography(1999)as well as the first commercial release of the digitised footage of the Apollo 11 moonwalk broadcast, both on an accompanying CDROM. For the second volume Godwin published the declassified crew debriefing which included the transcript of the infamous crew UFO sighting. He also produced and directed the 2002 direct-to-DVD Apollo 11 – Moonwalk which featured the first ever time-synchronized multiple-camera-angle movie of the first moonwalk and Moon landing. The DVD first appeared in the book Apollo 11 – The NASA Mission Reports Volume 3. (2002). Godwin has consulted on the Discovery Channel TV series Rocket Science and in 2007 Mars Rising. He also consulted on the Led Zeppelin episode of VH-1 Legends television show. In 2004 he appeared in the Apollo 11 episode of the History Channel series "Tech Effect". He also appeared in the 2010 BBC television series Rewind the Sixties talking about his recollections of the first Moon landing. At the Oshkosh air show, on 26 July 2019, for the 50th anniversary of the Apollo 11 flight to the Moon, Godwin premiered newly enhanced footage of Neil Armstrong and Buzz Aldrin on the lunar surface. Godwin reviewed the second generation inter-negative and discovered previously unseen details of the two astronauts working in the shadow of the lunar module. In 2021 he was invited to participate in a series of Podcasts about space flight hosted by actor Paul McGann.

== Awards and achievements ==
In 2002 Godwin's Mission Reports series won the Space Frontier Foundation's Best Presentation of Space Award.

In 2007 the International Astronomical Union's Committee for Small Body Nomenclature approved the naming of a main belt asteroid after Robert and his brother Richard Godwin for their efforts in documenting space history and raising public awareness about Near Earth Objects. 4252 Godwin is an absolute magnitude 12.7 minor planet discovered in 1985 by H. Debehogne at the European Southern Observatory.

From 2008 to 2011 Robert was the Space Curator at the Canadian Air and Space Museum in Toronto.
