= Frederick I. Ordway III =

American space scientist

- Born: April 4, 1927; New York City
- Died: July 1, 2014 (aged 87); Huntsville, Alabama
- Known for: Space advocacy, Technical consultant to 2001: A Space Odyssey
- Spouse: Maria Victoria Ordway (1950-2012)
- Scientific career
- Fields: Aerospace engineering
- Workplaces: –1960 Army Ballistic Missile Agency; 1960-1963 Marshall Space Flight Center space systems information; University of Alabama in Huntsville professor

Frederick Ira Ordway III (4 April 1927 – 1 July 2014) was an American space scientist and author of books on spaceflight.

Ordway was educated at Harvard University and completed several years of graduate study at the University of Paris and other universities in Europe. He owned a large collection of original paintings depicting astronautical themes. He was a member of many leading professional societies and was the author, co-author, or editor of more than thirty books and over three hundred articles.

As scientific consultant, he was part of the production team of 2001: A Space Odyssey. (Note: Galloway, Drew (2014-07-01). "Space pioneer & author Fred Ordway dies at 87". WHNT-TV. Huntsville, Alabama.)

At the time of his death, he was the longest-serving member of the American Rocket Society having joined in 1939, some 75 years earlier. (Note: "Ordway Collection Reflects Life Working Toward Space Exploration". Harvard College Library News. President and Fellows of Harvard College. 2006-10-12.) Ordway served as a member of the faculty at The University of Alabama in Huntsville (UAH) from 1970 to 1973, and he was awarded an honorary doctorate by UAH in 1992.

== Publications ==
- Braun, Wernher von; ————; Dooling, David (1985) [1975]. Space Travel: A History. New York City: Harper & Row. ISBN 978-0-0618-1898-1. OL 2550771M – via Internet Archive.
- ————; Sharpe, Mitchell R. (1979). The Rocket Team. Apogee Books Space Series. Vol. 36. New York City: Thomas Y. Crowell Co. ISBN 978-1-894959-00-1. OCLC 1132673550.
- ————; Stuhlinger, Ernst; Braun, Wernher von (1994). Wernher von Braun, Crusader for Space: A Biographical Memoir. Malabar, Florida: Krieger. ISBN 978-0-8946-4980-6. OCLC 1080748631.
- ————; Godwin, Robert (2014). 2001 The Heritage & Legacy of the Space Odyssey. Burlington, Ontario: Apogee Prime. ISBN 978-1-9268373-2-1. OCLC 951228347.
