= Seymour Liebergot =

American electrical engineer and flight controller

- Born: February 15, 1936 (age 90); Camden, New Jersey
- Education: Cal State Los Angeles
- Occupation: Flight controller – Apollo era thru Apollo–Soyuz Test Project
- Years active: 1964–1996
- Employer: NASA (Retired)
- Spouses: Deanna Cohen (m. 1957; div. 1972) Tania Andrasko (m. 1978; div. 1984) Elizabeth Craig Tharpe (m. 1990)
- Children: 3

Seymour "Sy" Abraham Liebergot (born February 15, 1936) is a retired NASA flight controller, serving during the Apollo program. Liebergot was an EECOM controller and was responsible for the electrical and environmental systems on board the Command Module. In 1970, he was part of the team that guided Apollo 13 back to Earth following the explosion that crippled the spacecraft.

He began his career in 1963 with North American Aviation after graduating from California State University, Los Angeles. In 1964, he came to NASA. Liebergot was an Assistant Flight Director on Apollo 4, then an EECOM flight controller on Apollo 8–15. On Apollo 17, he served as CSSB SPAN (SPacecraft ANalysis room) Support. He continued as a controller in the Skylab and ASTP missions.

== Early life ==
Seymour "Sy" Abraham Liebergot was born on February 15, 1936, in Camden, New Jersey, the second child of parents Ida née Soloff and Solomon "Sol" Liebergot. His paternal grandparents immigrated from Kyiv, Ukraine, and his maternal grandparents immigrated from Novosibkov, Russia to the U.S. Sy experienced an unstable and rough childhood. Though money was scarce, his father gambled, drank, and had many gangster friends and enemies. Ida spiraled into a nervous breakdown when Sol had an affair, attempting to kill Sy and his sister Phyllis in 1942. Ida was permanently institutionalized. Sol married the woman he had an affair with, and they later bore three more children. Sol constantly uprooted his family, moving from place to place in order to escape danger from his debts, and he neglected his family and often beat Sy.

== Career ==
=== Early work ===
After graduating high school in 1953, Liebergot worked as a copy boy at the Philadelphia Inquirer. In 1954, after turning 18, he decided to join the Army to take some time to receive technical training and figure out his life plans. He was stationed in Fort Huachuca and the Yuma Test Station, where he fulfilled weather activity duties. Sy was honorably discharged in 1957.

That same year, he moved to Los Angeles, and married his first wife, Deanna Cohen. He decided to attend college for Electrical Engineering and enrolled at the Los Angeles City Junior College (LACC) for his first two years of study. He simultaneously worked as a shoe salesman for five years to support himself and his family. Liebergot’s first daughter, Shelli Lyn was born in 1958 and his twin sons, Mark Daniel and Scot Alan, were born in 1960. He graduated from LACC after five semesters and enrolled in California State University at Los Angeles (CSLA) to finish the last two years of his degree.

Liebergot later moved to Houston to work for NASA.

=== Engineering career ===
While still in college, Liebergot accepted a part-time evening job at North American Aviation (NAA) in the Space & Information Systems Division (S&ID) College Engineering Unit. He became an assistant supervisor a year later. Their division later won a contract with NASA to build a part of the Saturn V lunar launch rocket. In 1962, he began working full time as an engineer and finished his degree at night in two semesters.

In 1964, Liebergot joined the Flight Operations Support Group, which provided command and service module (CSM) information to NASA’s flight operations in Houston. He stayed in Dowey, CA as a lead engineer while most of the group transferred to Houston. After 18 months, he tired of his position and joined the Flight Control Division in Houston, where he was a CSM Sequential Systems specialist, an advisor in the back room.

A year and a half later, wanting to participate in more of the action, Liebergot switched employment to NASA in the Manned Spacecraft Center’s Operations Control Room (MOCR), starting his career in flight control as the Apollo program was beginning.

In the 1966 AS-201 (Apollo/Saturn) mission, the first CSM test flight, Liebergot was still contracted to NASA and he served in the back room as a Sequential Systems specialist.

Becoming a NASA employee later that year, Liebergot served as the Operations & Procedures Officer (O&P) in the MOCR on AS-202, the second unmanned test flight.

On Apollo 4, AS-501, Liebergot became the Assistant Flight Director (AFD), assisting the Flight Director (FD) in his duties and serving as a backup for him.

After that mission, Liebergot switched to the Systems Branch. In Apollo 7 in 1968, he worked in the Staff Support Room (SSR) as the flight control division representative in the Spacecraft Analysis Room (SPAN).

Liebergot started as an Electrical, Environmental and COMmunication systems (EECOM) flight controller trainee on Apollo 8. From Apollo 9 through Apollo 15, he served as the CSM EECOM. Liebergot was assigned as the Lead EECOM in Apollo 14 because of his role in the Apollo 13 mission, for which he is well known. In Apollo 16, Liebergot worked as the CSSB SPAN Systems position, supporting the new EECOM. He continued as CSSB SPAN support in Apollo 17. The SPAN room connected the engineering and flight controlling divisions.

After the end of the Apollo program, Liebergot continued in the Skylab Earth-orbit mission as Electrical, General Instrumentation & Life Support (EGIL) flight controller, which had more systems to monitor than the CSM EECOM, and with the ability to control some systems from the console. He trained as an EGIL after Apollo 15.

In the Apollo-Soyuz Test Project (ASTP) in concert with the Russians, Liebergot served as the Lead EECOM. He was awarded the NASA Commendation Award for his leadership role.

With the close of ASTP, Liebergot moved to work on the Shuttle spacecraft as Lead EECOM, gathering knowledge and developing new procedures and rules. He designed the Free Water Collection System.

Losing passion for the job, Liebergot retired from active flight control in 1976.

In 1979, Liebergot began to work with other engineers on the Space Station to write a program plan. Along with former LM Control flight controller Hal Loden, they wrote the Operations section of the program plan.

When the Space Station Program Office was created in 1981 at the Johnson Space Center (JSC), Liebergot joined the Customer Integration Office.

In 1988, Liebergot retired early and ended his career at NASA. He soon found a job at Rockwell International in the Shuttle Program Office at JSC working for the program director as a SPAN back room advisor.

A couple of years later, Liebergot was hired to help with the Weightless Environment Training Facility (WETF) at the JSC. As a Senior Project Engineer for the ISS, he directed the designing of element trainers for the Neutral Buoyancy Laboratory for the ISS (water training pool).

In 1993, Liebergot transferred to work in the ISS Configuration Management organization of the company as a Senior Configuration Management Analyst, in which he tracked the equipment entering and leaving the ISS.

=== Apollo 13 ===
The Apollo 13 mission launched on April 11, 1970. Liebergot was 34 years old and the EECOM on shift when the malfunction occurred. 55 hours into the mission, at the last hour of his shift, Liebergot requested a tank stir before the crew went to sleep because the quality sensor reading for Oxygen Tank 2 had failed earlier. There were two liquid oxygen and two liquid hydrogen tanks on the spacecraft. In space, they became more fog-like and separated into different layers. The stir involved turning on two fans in each storage tank to mix the contents.

Unbenownst to the mission team, the wiring insulation inside Oxygen Tank 2 had been damaged during a ground handling mishap; when Command Module Pilot Jack Swigert flipped the four switches, Tank 2 exploded, which also caused Tank 1 to start leaking. The shock closed the valves to fuel cells 1 and 3 as well, leaving only a third of the electrical power generation system working.

When data started appearing abnormally, the responsibility fell on Liebergot. He initially thought it was an instrumentation problem, but other flight controllers also started having abnormalities, indicating a bigger problem was at hand. Liebergot worked with his back room support to figure out the issue, giving the astronaut crew instructions, and they eventually realized that they had lost two fuel cells. It was not an instrumentation error. Time was limited with the remaining oxygen tank to the CSM leaking and only one fuel cell remaining. The mission turned into one to save the crew and deliver them back to Earth safely.

If the cryo tanks were stirred later in the mission and the tanks/fuel cells lost later, the crew may not have been able to be saved. Liebergot was part of the Apollo 13 Mission Operations Team awarded the Presidential Medal of Freedom for their efforts to successfully save the astronauts.

== Personal life ==
Liebergot and Deanna Cohen divorced in 1972. Six years later in 1978, he married Tania Andrasko. They divorced in 1984. Liebergot later met Elizabeth Craig Tharpe in 1988 at a monthly ski club meeting. They married in 1990.

== In popular culture ==
In the 1995 film Apollo 13, Liebergot was played by Clint Howard.
