= List of minor planets: 429001–430000 =

The following is a partial list of minor planets, running from minor-planet number 429001 through 430000, inclusive. The primary data for this and other partial lists is based on JPL's "Small-Body Orbital Elements" and data available from the Minor Planet Center. Critical list information is also provided by the MPC, unless otherwise specified from Lowell Observatory. A detailed description of the table's columns and additional sources are given on the main page including a complete list of every page in this series, and a statistical break-up on the dynamical classification of minor planets.

Also see the summary list of all named bodies in numerical and alphabetical order, and the corresponding naming citations for the number range of this particular list. New namings may only be added to this list after official publication, as the preannouncement of names is condemned by the Working Group for Small Bodies Nomenclature of the International Astronomical Union.

Near-Earth obj.	MBA (inner)	MBA (outer)	Centaur
Mars-crosser	MBA (middle)	Jupiter trojan	Trans-Neptunian obj.
Unclassified

== 429001–429100 ==
Designation			Discovery			Properties		Ref
Permanent	Provisional	Named after	Date	Site	Discoverer(s)	Category	Diam.	Ref
429001	2009 BB_{38}	—	December 30, 2008	Mount Lemmon	Mount Lemmon Survey	·	2.8 km	MPC · JPL
429002	2009 BP_{46}	—	January 16, 2009	Kitt Peak	Spacewatch	·	3.5 km	MPC · JPL
429003	2009 BN_{51}	—	December 22, 2008	Kitt Peak	Spacewatch	HYG	2.7 km	MPC · JPL
429004	2009 BS_{51}	—	January 16, 2009	Mount Lemmon	Mount Lemmon Survey	·	3.4 km	MPC · JPL
429005	2009 BG_{52}	—	December 1, 2008	Mount Lemmon	Mount Lemmon Survey	H	550 m	MPC · JPL
429006	2009 BA_{63}	—	January 20, 2009	Kitt Peak	Spacewatch	THM	2.2 km	MPC · JPL
429007	2009 BQ_{69}	—	January 18, 2009	Kitt Peak	Spacewatch	·	5.9 km	MPC · JPL
429008	2009 BZ_{80}	—	January 20, 2009	Needville	J. Dellinger	·	7.1 km	MPC · JPL
429009	2009 BS_{85}	—	December 22, 2008	Kitt Peak	Spacewatch	·	3.1 km	MPC · JPL
429010	2009 BT_{93}	—	January 15, 2009	Kitt Peak	Spacewatch	EOS	2.0 km	MPC · JPL
429011	2009 BL_{98}	—	January 1, 2009	Kitt Peak	Spacewatch	·	2.9 km	MPC · JPL
429012	2009 BV_{101}	—	January 29, 2009	Mount Lemmon	Mount Lemmon Survey	·	3.9 km	MPC · JPL
429013	2009 BX_{103}	—	January 25, 2009	Kitt Peak	Spacewatch	·	3.8 km	MPC · JPL
429014	2009 BC_{105}	—	January 25, 2009	Kitt Peak	Spacewatch	·	2.9 km	MPC · JPL
429015	2009 BQ_{109}	—	November 23, 2008	Mount Lemmon	Mount Lemmon Survey	·	3.5 km	MPC · JPL
429016	2009 BY_{113}	—	January 2, 2009	Mount Lemmon	Mount Lemmon Survey	·	2.5 km	MPC · JPL
429017	2009 BZ_{113}	—	January 26, 2009	Mount Lemmon	Mount Lemmon Survey	·	1.6 km	MPC · JPL
429018	2009 BV_{114}	—	October 9, 2007	Kitt Peak	Spacewatch	·	2.3 km	MPC · JPL
429019	2009 BS_{127}	—	January 29, 2009	Kitt Peak	Spacewatch	EOS	1.8 km	MPC · JPL
429020	2009 BU_{130}	—	January 31, 2009	Mount Lemmon	Mount Lemmon Survey	·	3.0 km	MPC · JPL
429021	2009 BB_{136}	—	January 29, 2009	Kitt Peak	Spacewatch	·	2.5 km	MPC · JPL
429022	2009 BU_{138}	—	December 30, 2008	Mount Lemmon	Mount Lemmon Survey	EOS	2.1 km	MPC · JPL
429023	2009 BY_{148}	—	January 31, 2009	Kitt Peak	Spacewatch	·	2.9 km	MPC · JPL
429024	2009 BX_{155}	—	January 31, 2009	Kitt Peak	Spacewatch	·	3.3 km	MPC · JPL
429025	2009 BN_{156}	—	January 31, 2009	Kitt Peak	Spacewatch	·	3.8 km	MPC · JPL
429026	2009 BK_{163}	—	January 17, 2009	Kitt Peak	Spacewatch	·	2.9 km	MPC · JPL
429027	2009 BS_{165}	—	January 31, 2009	Kitt Peak	Spacewatch	·	2.7 km	MPC · JPL
429028	2009 BB_{172}	—	January 18, 2009	Catalina	CSS	·	2.7 km	MPC · JPL
429029	2009 BH_{178}	—	January 17, 2009	Kitt Peak	Spacewatch	·	5.0 km	MPC · JPL
429030	2009 BQ_{182}	—	January 18, 2009	Kitt Peak	Spacewatch	·	2.3 km	MPC · JPL
429031 Hannavonhoerner	2009 CJ_{4}	Hannavonhoerner	February 11, 2009	Calar Alto	F. Hormuth	EOS	1.8 km	MPC · JPL
429032 Sebvonhoerner	2009 CN_{4}	Sebvonhoerner	February 12, 2009	Calar Alto	F. Hormuth	·	3.0 km	MPC · JPL
429033 Günterwendt	2009 CF_{5}	Günterwendt	February 13, 2009	Calar Alto	F. Hormuth	LIX	4.5 km	MPC · JPL
429034	2009 CG_{23}	—	January 18, 2009	Kitt Peak	Spacewatch	EOS	1.6 km	MPC · JPL
429035	2009 CU_{25}	—	January 17, 2009	Kitt Peak	Spacewatch	·	2.8 km	MPC · JPL
429036	2009 CZ_{37}	—	September 17, 2006	Kitt Peak	Spacewatch	EOS	2.3 km	MPC · JPL
429037	2009 CW_{40}	—	December 30, 2008	Mount Lemmon	Mount Lemmon Survey	·	3.0 km	MPC · JPL
429038	2009 CG_{42}	—	February 13, 2009	Kitt Peak	Spacewatch	·	2.6 km	MPC · JPL
429039	2009 CW_{42}	—	February 14, 2009	Kitt Peak	Spacewatch	·	3.1 km	MPC · JPL
429040	2009 CR_{49}	—	February 1, 2009	Kitt Peak	Spacewatch	·	3.5 km	MPC · JPL
429041	2009 CB_{52}	—	November 24, 2008	Mount Lemmon	Mount Lemmon Survey	(3460)	2.1 km	MPC · JPL
429042	2009 CG_{54}	—	January 18, 2009	Mount Lemmon	Mount Lemmon Survey	·	3.1 km	MPC · JPL
429043	2009 CC_{60}	—	October 30, 2008	Kitt Peak	Spacewatch	·	3.0 km	MPC · JPL
429044	2009 CY_{62}	—	February 2, 2009	Catalina	CSS	·	3.3 km	MPC · JPL
429045	2009 DP_{1}	—	February 16, 2009	Dauban	Kugel, F.	·	2.4 km	MPC · JPL
429046	2009 DC_{2}	—	February 16, 2009	Dauban	Kugel, F.	·	2.4 km	MPC · JPL
429047	2009 DK_{2}	—	February 16, 2009	Dauban	Kugel, F.	HYG	2.5 km	MPC · JPL
429048	2009 DR_{4}	—	February 3, 2009	Mount Lemmon	Mount Lemmon Survey	·	2.6 km	MPC · JPL
429049	2009 DU_{11}	—	January 17, 2009	Mount Lemmon	Mount Lemmon Survey	·	3.2 km	MPC · JPL
429050	2009 DW_{21}	—	November 14, 2007	Mount Lemmon	Mount Lemmon Survey	·	2.4 km	MPC · JPL
429051	2009 DH_{46}	—	February 20, 2009	Mount Lemmon	Mount Lemmon Survey	·	5.5 km	MPC · JPL
429052	2009 DE_{52}	—	February 22, 2009	Kitt Peak	Spacewatch	·	4.5 km	MPC · JPL
429053	2009 DP_{55}	—	February 22, 2009	Kitt Peak	Spacewatch	THM	2.2 km	MPC · JPL
429054	2009 DY_{61}	—	February 22, 2009	Kitt Peak	Spacewatch	·	5.2 km	MPC · JPL
429055	2009 DS_{68}	—	February 22, 2009	Catalina	CSS	·	3.8 km	MPC · JPL
429056	2009 DG_{70}	—	February 26, 2009	Catalina	CSS	·	5.1 km	MPC · JPL
429057	2009 DE_{110}	—	February 19, 2009	Catalina	CSS	·	3.8 km	MPC · JPL
429058	2009 DV_{118}	—	February 27, 2009	Kitt Peak	Spacewatch	·	3.1 km	MPC · JPL
429059	2009 DR_{122}	—	February 19, 2009	Kitt Peak	Spacewatch	VER	2.5 km	MPC · JPL
429060	2009 DS_{122}	—	February 27, 2009	Kitt Peak	Spacewatch	·	3.2 km	MPC · JPL
429061	2009 EP_{5}	—	March 31, 2004	Kitt Peak	Spacewatch	·	3.4 km	MPC · JPL
429062	2009 EB_{31}	—	March 1, 2009	Bisei SG Center	BATTeRS	·	3.5 km	MPC · JPL
429063	2009 FK_{4}	—	March 18, 2009	Pla D'Arguines	R. Ferrando	·	4.1 km	MPC · JPL
429064	2009 FQ_{19}	—	February 20, 2009	Kitt Peak	Spacewatch	·	3.5 km	MPC · JPL
429065	2009 FY_{33}	—	January 16, 2009	Kitt Peak	Spacewatch	·	3.8 km	MPC · JPL
429066	2009 FF_{62}	—	February 28, 2009	Kitt Peak	Spacewatch	EOS	2.4 km	MPC · JPL
429067	2009 FA_{75}	—	March 31, 2009	Catalina	CSS	·	4.4 km	MPC · JPL
429068	2009 HM_{8}	—	April 17, 2009	Kitt Peak	Spacewatch	·	600 m	MPC · JPL
429069	2009 HP_{31}	—	April 19, 2009	Kitt Peak	Spacewatch	·	880 m	MPC · JPL
429070	2009 HR_{67}	—	April 27, 2009	Tzec Maun	L. Elenin	·	790 m	MPC · JPL
429071	2009 HM_{85}	—	April 29, 2009	Kitt Peak	Spacewatch	·	670 m	MPC · JPL
429072	2009 KT_{20}	—	May 29, 2009	Mount Lemmon	Mount Lemmon Survey	·	630 m	MPC · JPL
429073	2009 ND_{1}	—	July 13, 2009	Cerro Burek	Burek, Cerro	AMO +1km	2.5 km	MPC · JPL
429074	2009 OD_{5}	—	October 20, 2006	Mount Lemmon	Mount Lemmon Survey	·	1.5 km	MPC · JPL
429075	2009 OY_{9}	—	July 28, 2009	Catalina	CSS	·	820 m	MPC · JPL
429076	2009 OF_{14}	—	July 28, 2009	Catalina	CSS	·	850 m	MPC · JPL
429077	2009 PP_{16}	—	August 15, 2009	Kitt Peak	Spacewatch	·	1.2 km	MPC · JPL
429078	2009 PA_{19}	—	August 15, 2009	Kitt Peak	Spacewatch	·	1.3 km	MPC · JPL
429079	2009 QK_{23}	—	August 16, 2009	La Sagra	OAM	·	730 m	MPC · JPL
429080	2009 QW_{44}	—	August 27, 2009	Catalina	CSS	·	820 m	MPC · JPL
429081	2009 QX_{57}	—	October 4, 2005	Catalina	CSS	MAR	1.1 km	MPC · JPL
429082	2009 RW_{7}	—	September 12, 2009	Kitt Peak	Spacewatch	·	1 km	MPC · JPL
429083	2009 RP_{8}	—	September 12, 2009	Kitt Peak	Spacewatch	L4 · (222861)	8.7 km	MPC · JPL
429084 Dietrichrex	2009 RN_{27}	Dietrichrex	September 13, 2009	ESA OGS	Busch, M., Kresken, R.	MAR	1.1 km	MPC · JPL
429085	2009 RW_{29}	—	September 14, 2009	Kitt Peak	Spacewatch	·	1.3 km	MPC · JPL
429086	2009 RG_{42}	—	September 15, 2009	Kitt Peak	Spacewatch	·	1.7 km	MPC · JPL
429087	2009 RX_{42}	—	September 15, 2009	Kitt Peak	Spacewatch	·	1.3 km	MPC · JPL
429088	2009 RU_{43}	—	September 15, 2009	Kitt Peak	Spacewatch	·	830 m	MPC · JPL
429089	2009 RN_{45}	—	September 15, 2009	Kitt Peak	Spacewatch	·	1.0 km	MPC · JPL
429090	2009 RQ_{47}	—	September 15, 2009	Kitt Peak	Spacewatch	·	1.4 km	MPC · JPL
429091	2009 RJ_{51}	—	September 15, 2009	Kitt Peak	Spacewatch	·	2.0 km	MPC · JPL
429092	2009 RP_{59}	—	September 10, 2009	Catalina	CSS	slow	1.7 km	MPC · JPL
429093	2009 RU_{68}	—	September 15, 2009	Kitt Peak	Spacewatch	·	1.9 km	MPC · JPL
429094	2009 SG_{2}	—	September 18, 2009	Siding Spring	SSS	APO · PHA	350 m	MPC · JPL
429095	2009 SU_{8}	—	September 16, 2009	Kitt Peak	Spacewatch	L4	7.7 km	MPC · JPL
429096	2009 SB_{10}	—	September 16, 2009	Mount Lemmon	Mount Lemmon Survey	·	1.2 km	MPC · JPL
429097	2009 SJ_{19}	—	September 22, 2009	Taunus	Karge, S., Zimmer, U.	·	1.7 km	MPC · JPL
429098	2009 SN_{21}	—	September 22, 2009	Bergisch Gladbach	W. Bickel	·	1.6 km	MPC · JPL
429099	2009 SD_{36}	—	September 1, 2005	Kitt Peak	Spacewatch	V	550 m	MPC · JPL
429100	2009 SB_{39}	—	September 16, 2009	Kitt Peak	Spacewatch	·	1.3 km	MPC · JPL

== 429101–429200 ==
back to top

Designation			Discovery			Properties		Ref
Permanent	Provisional	Named after	Date	Site	Discoverer(s)	Category	Diam.	Ref
429101	2009 SV_{42}	—	September 16, 2009	Kitt Peak	Spacewatch	·	2.1 km	MPC · JPL
429102	2009 SZ_{45}	—	August 18, 2009	Catalina	CSS	(1547)	1.9 km	MPC · JPL
429103	2009 SN_{57}	—	September 17, 2009	Kitt Peak	Spacewatch	·	1.5 km	MPC · JPL
429104	2009 SL_{70}	—	September 17, 2009	Kitt Peak	Spacewatch	·	1.3 km	MPC · JPL
429105	2009 SQ_{73}	—	August 17, 2009	Kitt Peak	Spacewatch	·	1.2 km	MPC · JPL
429106	2009 SJ_{79}	—	October 13, 2005	Kitt Peak	Spacewatch	·	1.5 km	MPC · JPL
429107	2009 SU_{136}	—	September 18, 2009	Kitt Peak	Spacewatch	·	1.3 km	MPC · JPL
429108	2009 SY_{145}	—	August 16, 2009	Kitt Peak	Spacewatch	·	820 m	MPC · JPL
429109	2009 SR_{156}	—	September 20, 2009	Kitt Peak	Spacewatch	·	2.3 km	MPC · JPL
429110	2009 SO_{163}	—	September 21, 2009	Catalina	CSS	JUN	930 m	MPC · JPL
429111	2009 SQ_{173}	—	September 11, 2009	Catalina	CSS	·	2.0 km	MPC · JPL
429112	2009 SE_{192}	—	September 22, 2009	Kitt Peak	Spacewatch	(5)	1.1 km	MPC · JPL
429113	2009 SJ_{197}	—	September 22, 2009	Kitt Peak	Spacewatch	L4	10 km	MPC · JPL
429114	2009 SU_{202}	—	September 22, 2009	Kitt Peak	Spacewatch	·	1.5 km	MPC · JPL
429115	2009 SK_{219}	—	July 11, 2005	Kitt Peak	Spacewatch	·	1.0 km	MPC · JPL
429116	2009 SZ_{224}	—	September 25, 2009	Kitt Peak	Spacewatch	·	1.3 km	MPC · JPL
429117	2009 SF_{236}	—	August 2, 2009	Siding Spring	SSS	·	1.3 km	MPC · JPL
429118	2009 SC_{243}	—	September 21, 2009	La Sagra	OAM	·	1.7 km	MPC · JPL
429119	2009 SS_{265}	—	September 23, 2009	Mount Lemmon	Mount Lemmon Survey	·	930 m	MPC · JPL
429120 Mikhaillavrov	2009 SW_{267}	Mikhaillavrov	September 23, 2009	Zelenchukskaya Stn118222	T. V. Krjačko	·	1.3 km	MPC · JPL
429121	2009 SM_{278}	—	September 25, 2009	Kitt Peak	Spacewatch	·	920 m	MPC · JPL
429122	2009 SG_{296}	—	September 27, 2009	Kitt Peak	Spacewatch	·	1.1 km	MPC · JPL
429123	2009 SK_{297}	—	September 28, 2009	Catalina	CSS	·	980 m	MPC · JPL
429124	2009 SV_{304}	—	August 16, 2009	Kitt Peak	Spacewatch	V	630 m	MPC · JPL
429125	2009 SX_{329}	—	August 18, 2009	Catalina	CSS	·	1.9 km	MPC · JPL
429126	2009 SJ_{334}	—	September 20, 2009	Kitt Peak	Spacewatch	EUN	1.3 km	MPC · JPL
429127	2009 SS_{335}	—	September 21, 2009	Kitt Peak	Spacewatch	·	1.5 km	MPC · JPL
429128	2009 SC_{339}	—	September 21, 2009	Catalina	CSS	·	2.3 km	MPC · JPL
429129	2009 SP_{341}	—	September 26, 2009	Kitt Peak	Spacewatch	·	1.7 km	MPC · JPL
429130	2009 SO_{345}	—	September 19, 2009	Kitt Peak	Spacewatch	·	900 m	MPC · JPL
429131	2009 SJ_{354}	—	September 20, 2009	Mount Lemmon	Mount Lemmon Survey	·	3.2 km	MPC · JPL
429132	2009 SZ_{355}	—	September 23, 2009	Mount Lemmon	Mount Lemmon Survey	L4	8.3 km	MPC · JPL
429133	2009 SO_{361}	—	September 28, 2009	Kitt Peak	Spacewatch	·	1.9 km	MPC · JPL
429134	2009 TP_{5}	—	October 11, 2009	Mount Lemmon	Mount Lemmon Survey	·	1.2 km	MPC · JPL
429135	2009 TW_{6}	—	September 23, 2009	Mount Lemmon	Mount Lemmon Survey	·	1.7 km	MPC · JPL
429136 Corsali	2009 TJ_{8}	Corsali	October 13, 2009	Vallemare Borbona	V. S. Casulli	·	720 m	MPC · JPL
429137	2009 TA_{9}	—	October 12, 2009	La Sagra	OAM	·	1.8 km	MPC · JPL
429138	2009 TY_{24}	—	October 14, 2009	Catalina	CSS	V	770 m	MPC · JPL
429139	2009 TA_{40}	—	September 27, 2009	Catalina	CSS	·	2.4 km	MPC · JPL
429140	2009 TW_{46}	—	October 13, 2009	La Sagra	OAM	·	2.9 km	MPC · JPL
429141	2009 UV_{9}	—	November 6, 2005	Mount Lemmon	Mount Lemmon Survey	·	1.3 km	MPC · JPL
429142	2009 UP_{33}	—	October 18, 2009	Mount Lemmon	Mount Lemmon Survey	·	1.3 km	MPC · JPL
429143	2009 UX_{34}	—	October 21, 2009	Mount Lemmon	Mount Lemmon Survey	·	1.8 km	MPC · JPL
429144	2009 UH_{44}	—	October 18, 2009	Mount Lemmon	Mount Lemmon Survey	KON	1.7 km	MPC · JPL
429145	2009 UV_{57}	—	October 23, 2009	Mount Lemmon	Mount Lemmon Survey	·	930 m	MPC · JPL
429146	2009 UD_{83}	—	October 23, 2009	Mount Lemmon	Mount Lemmon Survey	·	1.3 km	MPC · JPL
429147	2009 UA_{91}	—	September 30, 2009	Mount Lemmon	Mount Lemmon Survey	ADE	1.9 km	MPC · JPL
429148	2009 UX_{94}	—	September 28, 2009	Catalina	CSS	·	1.3 km	MPC · JPL
429149	2009 UU_{102}	—	September 19, 2009	Mount Lemmon	Mount Lemmon Survey	·	1.4 km	MPC · JPL
429150	2009 UE_{105}	—	October 25, 2009	Mount Lemmon	Mount Lemmon Survey	·	1.5 km	MPC · JPL
429151	2009 UD_{110}	—	September 19, 2009	Mount Lemmon	Mount Lemmon Survey	·	1.1 km	MPC · JPL
429152	2009 UY_{110}	—	September 21, 2009	Mount Lemmon	Mount Lemmon Survey	·	1.6 km	MPC · JPL
429153	2009 UK_{114}	—	September 12, 2009	Kitt Peak	Spacewatch	L4	6.7 km	MPC · JPL
429154	2009 UO_{120}	—	October 23, 2009	Mount Lemmon	Mount Lemmon Survey	NYS	1.0 km	MPC · JPL
429155	2009 UR_{121}	—	September 16, 2009	Catalina	CSS	PHO	1.1 km	MPC · JPL
429156	2009 UB_{128}	—	September 20, 2009	Mount Lemmon	Mount Lemmon Survey	·	1.0 km	MPC · JPL
429157	2009 UC_{129}	—	October 24, 2009	Socorro	LINEAR	(1547)	2.2 km	MPC · JPL
429158	2009 UX_{137}	—	September 15, 2009	Kitt Peak	Spacewatch	·	1.6 km	MPC · JPL
429159	2009 UJ_{149}	—	October 25, 2009	Kitt Peak	Spacewatch	·	1.2 km	MPC · JPL
429160	2009 UY_{152}	—	October 23, 2009	Kitt Peak	Spacewatch	·	1.2 km	MPC · JPL
429161	2009 US_{154}	—	October 2, 2009	Mount Lemmon	Mount Lemmon Survey	·	990 m	MPC · JPL
429162	2009 VW_{2}	—	November 9, 2009	Socorro	LINEAR	·	1.9 km	MPC · JPL
429163	2009 VY_{16}	—	November 8, 2009	Mount Lemmon	Mount Lemmon Survey	·	2.3 km	MPC · JPL
429164	2009 VL_{21}	—	November 9, 2009	Mount Lemmon	Mount Lemmon Survey	NYS	1.2 km	MPC · JPL
429165	2009 VU_{21}	—	November 9, 2009	Mount Lemmon	Mount Lemmon Survey	·	1.7 km	MPC · JPL
429166	2009 VT_{26}	—	November 8, 2009	Kitt Peak	Spacewatch	·	1.9 km	MPC · JPL
429167	2009 VN_{30}	—	November 9, 2009	Mount Lemmon	Mount Lemmon Survey	·	1.4 km	MPC · JPL
429168	2009 VD_{51}	—	November 15, 2009	Catalina	CSS	·	1.3 km	MPC · JPL
429169	2009 VT_{52}	—	October 24, 2009	Kitt Peak	Spacewatch	SUL	2.0 km	MPC · JPL
429170	2009 VA_{60}	—	September 28, 2009	Mount Lemmon	Mount Lemmon Survey	·	2.1 km	MPC · JPL
429171	2009 VY_{65}	—	November 9, 2009	Kitt Peak	Spacewatch	·	1.6 km	MPC · JPL
429172	2009 VO_{69}	—	September 20, 2009	Mount Lemmon	Mount Lemmon Survey	·	2.0 km	MPC · JPL
429173	2009 VE_{72}	—	November 9, 2009	Catalina	CSS	·	1.3 km	MPC · JPL
429174	2009 VY_{72}	—	November 11, 2009	Kitt Peak	Spacewatch	·	1.3 km	MPC · JPL
429175	2009 VR_{75}	—	November 13, 2009	La Sagra	OAM	·	1.4 km	MPC · JPL
429176	2009 VV_{80}	—	November 15, 2009	Catalina	CSS	·	960 m	MPC · JPL
429177	2009 VB_{82}	—	September 20, 2009	Mount Lemmon	Mount Lemmon Survey	·	1.6 km	MPC · JPL
429178	2009 VO_{89}	—	November 11, 2009	Kitt Peak	Spacewatch	·	1.1 km	MPC · JPL
429179	2009 VE_{96}	—	September 22, 2009	Mount Lemmon	Mount Lemmon Survey	·	1.9 km	MPC · JPL
429180	2009 VW_{100}	—	November 3, 2005	Mount Lemmon	Mount Lemmon Survey	·	1.4 km	MPC · JPL
429181	2009 VC_{109}	—	November 9, 2009	Mount Lemmon	Mount Lemmon Survey	·	2.2 km	MPC · JPL
429182	2009 VC_{111}	—	November 10, 2009	Kitt Peak	Spacewatch	·	2.5 km	MPC · JPL
429183	2009 WZ_{6}	—	November 8, 2009	Kitt Peak	Spacewatch	(5)	1.2 km	MPC · JPL
429184	2009 WY_{9}	—	October 12, 2009	Mount Lemmon	Mount Lemmon Survey	·	2.4 km	MPC · JPL
429185	2009 WH_{15}	—	November 16, 2009	Mount Lemmon	Mount Lemmon Survey	·	1.9 km	MPC · JPL
429186	2009 WR_{28}	—	November 8, 2009	Kitt Peak	Spacewatch	·	1.4 km	MPC · JPL
429187	2009 WX_{32}	—	December 21, 2005	Kitt Peak	Spacewatch	·	1.7 km	MPC · JPL
429188	2009 WL_{33}	—	November 8, 2009	Kitt Peak	Spacewatch	·	2.2 km	MPC · JPL
429189	2009 WN_{39}	—	September 20, 2009	Mount Lemmon	Mount Lemmon Survey	·	1.1 km	MPC · JPL
429190	2009 WN_{40}	—	September 30, 2009	Mount Lemmon	Mount Lemmon Survey	EUN	1.1 km	MPC · JPL
429191	2009 WL_{53}	—	November 9, 2009	Catalina	CSS	MRX	1.1 km	MPC · JPL
429192	2009 WM_{53}	—	November 17, 2009	Catalina	CSS	·	1.6 km	MPC · JPL
429193	2009 WO_{78}	—	November 18, 2009	Kitt Peak	Spacewatch	EUN	1.4 km	MPC · JPL
429194	2009 WL_{83}	—	November 19, 2009	Kitt Peak	Spacewatch	·	870 m	MPC · JPL
429195	2009 WU_{88}	—	February 1, 2006	Kitt Peak	Spacewatch	·	1.9 km	MPC · JPL
429196	2009 WM_{89}	—	November 19, 2009	Kitt Peak	Spacewatch	·	2.2 km	MPC · JPL
429197	2009 WR_{102}	—	November 9, 2009	Catalina	CSS	·	2.6 km	MPC · JPL
429198	2009 WV_{115}	—	October 14, 2009	Mount Lemmon	Mount Lemmon Survey	EUN	1.2 km	MPC · JPL
429199	2009 WP_{118}	—	November 8, 2009	Kitt Peak	Spacewatch	MRX	790 m	MPC · JPL
429200	2009 WP_{122}	—	March 19, 2007	Catalina	CSS	RAF	960 m	MPC · JPL

== 429201–429300 ==
back to top

Designation			Discovery			Properties		Ref
Permanent	Provisional	Named after	Date	Site	Discoverer(s)	Category	Diam.	Ref
429201	2009 WQ_{126}	—	November 20, 2009	Kitt Peak	Spacewatch	·	1.4 km	MPC · JPL
429202	2009 WP_{165}	—	November 9, 2009	Kitt Peak	Spacewatch	·	1.8 km	MPC · JPL
429203	2009 WB_{168}	—	November 22, 2009	Kitt Peak	Spacewatch	·	1.3 km	MPC · JPL
429204	2009 WK_{168}	—	November 22, 2009	Kitt Peak	Spacewatch	·	1.8 km	MPC · JPL
429205	2009 WG_{186}	—	November 24, 2009	Mount Lemmon	Mount Lemmon Survey	·	1.1 km	MPC · JPL
429206	2009 WT_{190}	—	November 29, 2005	Kitt Peak	Spacewatch	·	1.1 km	MPC · JPL
429207	2009 WK_{194}	—	September 21, 2009	Mount Lemmon	Mount Lemmon Survey	·	1.6 km	MPC · JPL
429208	2009 WD_{195}	—	November 18, 2009	Mount Lemmon	Mount Lemmon Survey	MRX	980 m	MPC · JPL
429209	2009 WZ_{196}	—	November 25, 2009	Catalina	CSS	·	2.8 km	MPC · JPL
429210	2009 WC_{207}	—	December 30, 2005	Mount Lemmon	Mount Lemmon Survey	·	1.2 km	MPC · JPL
429211	2009 WR_{218}	—	April 15, 2007	Kitt Peak	Spacewatch	WIT	1.0 km	MPC · JPL
429212	2009 WC_{226}	—	October 27, 2009	Kitt Peak	Spacewatch	·	1.3 km	MPC · JPL
429213	2009 WD_{233}	—	October 12, 2009	Mount Lemmon	Mount Lemmon Survey	·	2.1 km	MPC · JPL
429214	2009 WX_{247}	—	January 22, 2006	Mount Lemmon	Mount Lemmon Survey	·	1.3 km	MPC · JPL
429215	2009 WW_{256}	—	November 24, 2009	Kitt Peak	Spacewatch	·	2.5 km	MPC · JPL
429216	2009 WY_{262}	—	November 23, 2009	Mount Lemmon	Mount Lemmon Survey	·	2.5 km	MPC · JPL
429217	2009 WW_{263}	—	November 23, 2009	Kitt Peak	Spacewatch	·	2.6 km	MPC · JPL
429218	2009 XK_{17}	—	September 28, 2009	Kitt Peak	Spacewatch	·	1.8 km	MPC · JPL
429219	2009 XU_{18}	—	December 15, 2009	Mount Lemmon	Mount Lemmon Survey	·	2.3 km	MPC · JPL
429220	2009 XZ_{22}	—	December 10, 2009	Mount Lemmon	Mount Lemmon Survey	·	1.9 km	MPC · JPL
429221	2009 XG_{24}	—	December 12, 2009	Socorro	LINEAR	·	3.5 km	MPC · JPL
429222	2009 YQ_{11}	—	December 18, 2009	Mount Lemmon	Mount Lemmon Survey	·	2.4 km	MPC · JPL
429223	2009 YS_{13}	—	December 18, 2009	Mount Lemmon	Mount Lemmon Survey	·	1.5 km	MPC · JPL
429224	2009 YJ_{16}	—	December 19, 2009	Mount Lemmon	Mount Lemmon Survey	·	1.6 km	MPC · JPL
429225	2009 YC_{24}	—	December 16, 2009	Socorro	LINEAR	·	2.9 km	MPC · JPL
429226	2009 YL_{25}	—	December 18, 2009	Kitt Peak	Spacewatch	DOR	2.3 km	MPC · JPL
429227	2010 AE_{7}	—	November 17, 2009	Mount Lemmon	Mount Lemmon Survey	·	2.3 km	MPC · JPL
429228	2010 AB_{20}	—	December 19, 2009	Kitt Peak	Spacewatch	AGN	1.2 km	MPC · JPL
429229	2010 AA_{37}	—	March 10, 2005	Catalina	CSS	·	3.3 km	MPC · JPL
429230	2010 AK_{37}	—	January 7, 2010	Kitt Peak	Spacewatch	·	1.8 km	MPC · JPL
429231	2010 AZ_{40}	—	January 5, 2010	Kitt Peak	Spacewatch	·	2.2 km	MPC · JPL
429232	2010 AJ_{41}	—	January 6, 2010	Kitt Peak	Spacewatch	·	1.8 km	MPC · JPL
429233	2010 AB_{42}	—	January 6, 2010	Kitt Peak	Spacewatch	DOR	2.7 km	MPC · JPL
429234	2010 AK_{45}	—	December 17, 2009	Kitt Peak	Spacewatch	·	2.7 km	MPC · JPL
429235	2010 AK_{51}	—	January 8, 2010	Kitt Peak	Spacewatch	·	3.7 km	MPC · JPL
429236	2010 AT_{52}	—	November 28, 1995	Kitt Peak	Spacewatch	·	1.5 km	MPC · JPL
429237	2010 AB_{60}	—	January 6, 2010	Catalina	CSS	DOR	2.7 km	MPC · JPL
429238	2010 AN_{70}	—	December 20, 2009	Kitt Peak	Spacewatch	·	1.7 km	MPC · JPL
429239	2010 AR_{75}	—	January 8, 2010	Catalina	CSS	EUN	2.5 km	MPC · JPL
429240	2010 AL_{76}	—	January 14, 2010	Gnosca	S. Sposetti	·	2.3 km	MPC · JPL
429241	2010 AP_{77}	—	January 12, 2010	Catalina	CSS	·	2.3 km	MPC · JPL
429242	2010 AC_{86}	—	October 7, 2007	Mount Lemmon	Mount Lemmon Survey	·	5.1 km	MPC · JPL
429243	2010 AF_{86}	—	April 4, 2010	Catalina	CSS	·	3.0 km	MPC · JPL
429244	2010 AF_{89}	—	March 15, 2010	Catalina	CSS	·	5.3 km	MPC · JPL
429245	2010 AQ_{105}	—	January 12, 2010	WISE	WISE	·	4.0 km	MPC · JPL
429246	2010 AW_{105}	—	February 18, 2010	Mount Lemmon	Mount Lemmon Survey	·	4.4 km	MPC · JPL
429247	2010 AR_{107}	—	April 15, 2010	Mount Lemmon	Mount Lemmon Survey	·	4.3 km	MPC · JPL
429248	2010 AW_{125}	—	January 14, 2010	WISE	WISE	·	6.1 km	MPC · JPL
429249	2010 BR_{7}	—	March 17, 2004	Kitt Peak	Spacewatch	·	3.3 km	MPC · JPL
429250	2010 BP_{15}	—	March 15, 2010	Kitt Peak	Spacewatch	·	4.1 km	MPC · JPL
429251	2010 BJ_{25}	—	January 17, 2010	WISE	WISE	·	4.1 km	MPC · JPL
429252	2010 BU_{36}	—	January 18, 2010	WISE	WISE	·	2.7 km	MPC · JPL
429253	2010 BF_{61}	—	January 21, 2010	WISE	WISE	·	4.5 km	MPC · JPL
429254	2010 BU_{63}	—	March 20, 2004	Kitt Peak	Spacewatch	T_{j} (2.98)	4.2 km	MPC · JPL
429255	2010 BY_{68}	—	August 21, 2006	Kitt Peak	Spacewatch	·	4.5 km	MPC · JPL
429256	2010 BW_{71}	—	January 23, 2010	WISE	WISE	·	3.1 km	MPC · JPL
429257	2010 BM_{73}	—	January 23, 2010	WISE	WISE	·	5.1 km	MPC · JPL
429258	2010 BX_{73}	—	December 30, 2008	Mount Lemmon	Mount Lemmon Survey	·	5.2 km	MPC · JPL
429259	2010 BA_{78}	—	March 17, 2004	Kitt Peak	Spacewatch	·	3.7 km	MPC · JPL
429260	2010 BB_{79}	—	October 11, 2006	Kitt Peak	Spacewatch	·	2.9 km	MPC · JPL
429261	2010 BE_{81}	—	April 21, 2010	Siding Spring	SSS	·	5.0 km	MPC · JPL
429262	2010 CZ_{1}	—	November 21, 2009	Mount Lemmon	Mount Lemmon Survey	·	2.3 km	MPC · JPL
429263	2010 CJ_{12}	—	February 12, 2010	Mayhill	Lowe, A.	DOR	2.1 km	MPC · JPL
429264	2010 CO_{14}	—	February 10, 2010	WISE	WISE	·	3.8 km	MPC · JPL
429265	2010 CW_{15}	—	February 10, 2010	WISE	WISE	·	4.6 km	MPC · JPL
429266	2010 CQ_{28}	—	February 9, 2010	Kitt Peak	Spacewatch	·	1.8 km	MPC · JPL
429267	2010 CB_{31}	—	February 9, 2010	Kitt Peak	Spacewatch	·	1.6 km	MPC · JPL
429268	2010 CL_{40}	—	February 13, 2010	Mount Lemmon	Mount Lemmon Survey	·	3.8 km	MPC · JPL
429269	2010 CB_{41}	—	February 13, 2010	Mount Lemmon	Mount Lemmon Survey	·	3.6 km	MPC · JPL
429270	2010 CZ_{50}	—	February 13, 2010	WISE	WISE	·	3.0 km	MPC · JPL
429271	2010 CU_{63}	—	February 9, 2010	Kitt Peak	Spacewatch	THM	2.2 km	MPC · JPL
429272	2010 CA_{67}	—	February 10, 2010	Kitt Peak	Spacewatch	·	3.2 km	MPC · JPL
429273	2010 CV_{67}	—	February 10, 2010	Kitt Peak	Spacewatch	EOS	2.1 km	MPC · JPL
429274	2010 CG_{75}	—	February 13, 2010	Mount Lemmon	Mount Lemmon Survey	·	2.4 km	MPC · JPL
429275	2010 CY_{94}	—	February 14, 2010	Kitt Peak	Spacewatch	·	4.6 km	MPC · JPL
429276	2010 CM_{98}	—	February 14, 2010	Mount Lemmon	Mount Lemmon Survey	·	2.1 km	MPC · JPL
429277	2010 CA_{101}	—	January 12, 2010	Kitt Peak	Spacewatch	·	2.4 km	MPC · JPL
429278	2010 CG_{104}	—	February 14, 2010	Kitt Peak	Spacewatch	THM	2.6 km	MPC · JPL
429279	2010 CC_{115}	—	December 19, 2004	Mount Lemmon	Mount Lemmon Survey	AGN	1.1 km	MPC · JPL
429280	2010 CB_{125}	—	February 15, 2010	Kitt Peak	Spacewatch	·	1.9 km	MPC · JPL
429281	2010 CQ_{132}	—	February 15, 2010	WISE	WISE	·	3.5 km	MPC · JPL
429282	2010 CR_{139}	—	February 9, 2010	Catalina	CSS	·	4.0 km	MPC · JPL
429283	2010 CT_{142}	—	February 9, 2010	Kitt Peak	Spacewatch	EOS	1.8 km	MPC · JPL
429284	2010 CR_{143}	—	December 18, 2009	Mount Lemmon	Mount Lemmon Survey	·	2.1 km	MPC · JPL
429285	2010 CX_{144}	—	February 13, 2010	Mount Lemmon	Mount Lemmon Survey	·	2.1 km	MPC · JPL
429286	2010 CZ_{144}	—	January 12, 2010	Mount Lemmon	Mount Lemmon Survey	·	3.3 km	MPC · JPL
429287	2010 CR_{145}	—	February 14, 2010	Catalina	CSS	·	2.2 km	MPC · JPL
429288	2010 CD_{146}	—	April 2, 2006	Kitt Peak	Spacewatch	·	2.0 km	MPC · JPL
429289	2010 CV_{147}	—	February 13, 2010	Mount Lemmon	Mount Lemmon Survey	·	2.0 km	MPC · JPL
429290	2010 CZ_{150}	—	December 21, 2008	Catalina	CSS	·	2.4 km	MPC · JPL
429291	2010 CH_{152}	—	February 14, 2010	Kitt Peak	Spacewatch	·	3.1 km	MPC · JPL
429292	2010 CZ_{155}	—	February 9, 2010	Kitt Peak	Spacewatch	·	3.1 km	MPC · JPL
429293	2010 CC_{161}	—	February 12, 2004	Kitt Peak	Spacewatch	·	3.7 km	MPC · JPL
429294	2010 CU_{164}	—	February 10, 2010	Kitt Peak	Spacewatch	·	4.5 km	MPC · JPL
429295	2010 CQ_{180}	—	February 13, 2010	Catalina	CSS	·	4.6 km	MPC · JPL
429296	2010 CO_{183}	—	September 10, 2007	Kitt Peak	Spacewatch	·	3.0 km	MPC · JPL
429297	2010 CB_{218}	—	April 16, 2004	Kitt Peak	Spacewatch	·	3.4 km	MPC · JPL
429298	2010 CB_{220}	—	February 7, 2010	WISE	WISE	·	3.4 km	MPC · JPL
429299	2010 CV_{229}	—	February 9, 2010	WISE	WISE	·	4.9 km	MPC · JPL
429300	2010 DA_{1}	—	December 19, 2009	Kitt Peak	Spacewatch	·	3.5 km	MPC · JPL

== 429301–429400 ==
back to top

Designation			Discovery			Properties		Ref
Permanent	Provisional	Named after	Date	Site	Discoverer(s)	Category	Diam.	Ref
429301	2010 DC_{14}	—	February 17, 2010	WISE	WISE	·	3.6 km	MPC · JPL
429302	2010 DU_{16}	—	February 16, 2010	WISE	WISE	·	3.2 km	MPC · JPL
429303	2010 DG_{17}	—	October 15, 2007	Kitt Peak	Spacewatch	·	4.5 km	MPC · JPL
429304	2010 DA_{19}	—	February 16, 2010	WISE	WISE	·	4.4 km	MPC · JPL
429305	2010 DH_{21}	—	February 17, 2010	WISE	WISE	·	3.3 km	MPC · JPL
429306	2010 DM_{38}	—	February 16, 2010	Mount Lemmon	Mount Lemmon Survey	·	2.4 km	MPC · JPL
429307	2010 DX_{45}	—	February 17, 2010	Kitt Peak	Spacewatch	·	2.6 km	MPC · JPL
429308	2010 DY_{45}	—	February 17, 2010	Kitt Peak	Spacewatch	·	3.3 km	MPC · JPL
429309	2010 DM_{77}	—	February 19, 2010	LightBuckets	LightBuckets	·	2.6 km	MPC · JPL
429310	2010 DW_{91}	—	March 23, 2006	Catalina	CSS	·	2.5 km	MPC · JPL
429311	2010 EU_{20}	—	February 14, 2010	Mount Lemmon	Mount Lemmon Survey	·	2.3 km	MPC · JPL
429312	2010 EN_{30}	—	March 10, 2010	Bergisch Gladbach	W. Bickel	·	5.2 km	MPC · JPL
429313	2010 EZ_{32}	—	March 4, 2010	Kitt Peak	Spacewatch	·	2.1 km	MPC · JPL
429314	2010 ED_{40}	—	March 12, 2010	Catalina	CSS	·	2.5 km	MPC · JPL
429315	2010 EP_{69}	—	March 13, 2010	Catalina	CSS	LIX	4.0 km	MPC · JPL
429316	2010 EU_{70}	—	February 18, 2010	Mount Lemmon	Mount Lemmon Survey	·	4.2 km	MPC · JPL
429317	2010 EE_{71}	—	March 12, 2010	Mount Lemmon	Mount Lemmon Survey	·	1.7 km	MPC · JPL
429318	2010 EO_{72}	—	March 13, 2010	Mount Lemmon	Mount Lemmon Survey	KOR	1.3 km	MPC · JPL
429319	2010 EP_{72}	—	March 13, 2010	Mount Lemmon	Mount Lemmon Survey	·	1.7 km	MPC · JPL
429320	2010 EA_{81}	—	November 19, 2008	Kitt Peak	Spacewatch	·	2.4 km	MPC · JPL
429321	2010 EL_{84}	—	March 13, 2010	Kitt Peak	Spacewatch	·	2.2 km	MPC · JPL
429322	2010 EF_{86}	—	March 13, 2010	Kitt Peak	Spacewatch	·	3.3 km	MPC · JPL
429323	2010 EA_{88}	—	January 11, 2010	Kitt Peak	Spacewatch	·	4.7 km	MPC · JPL
429324	2010 EH_{89}	—	March 14, 2010	Kitt Peak	Spacewatch	·	2.6 km	MPC · JPL
429325	2010 EB_{90}	—	March 14, 2010	Kitt Peak	Spacewatch	·	3.9 km	MPC · JPL
429326	2010 EF_{99}	—	March 14, 2010	Kitt Peak	Spacewatch	·	1.9 km	MPC · JPL
429327	2010 EY_{99}	—	September 26, 2006	Kitt Peak	Spacewatch	TIR	2.6 km	MPC · JPL
429328	2010 EZ_{106}	—	March 12, 2010	Kitt Peak	Spacewatch	THM	2.5 km	MPC · JPL
429329	2010 ED_{113}	—	March 14, 2010	Kitt Peak	Spacewatch	·	2.9 km	MPC · JPL
429330	2010 EO_{125}	—	February 16, 2010	Catalina	CSS	·	3.1 km	MPC · JPL
429331	2010 ET_{127}	—	March 13, 2010	Catalina	CSS	NAE	4.4 km	MPC · JPL
429332	2010 EZ_{129}	—	March 13, 2010	Kitt Peak	Spacewatch	·	2.8 km	MPC · JPL
429333	2010 EZ_{130}	—	March 14, 2010	Kitt Peak	Spacewatch	·	3.6 km	MPC · JPL
429334	2010 EM_{132}	—	March 12, 2010	Kitt Peak	Spacewatch	·	3.6 km	MPC · JPL
429335	2010 EQ_{133}	—	March 14, 2010	Kitt Peak	Spacewatch	·	2.7 km	MPC · JPL
429336	2010 EZ_{142}	—	March 13, 2010	Kitt Peak	Spacewatch	THM	3.0 km	MPC · JPL
429337	2010 EM_{143}	—	November 2, 2007	Kitt Peak	Spacewatch	·	2.7 km	MPC · JPL
429338	2010 FO_{12}	—	September 15, 2007	Kitt Peak	Spacewatch	·	3.2 km	MPC · JPL
429339	2010 FP_{12}	—	March 16, 2010	Kitt Peak	Spacewatch	·	3.0 km	MPC · JPL
429340	2010 FW_{15}	—	March 18, 2010	Kitt Peak	Spacewatch	·	3.3 km	MPC · JPL
429341	2010 FN_{18}	—	March 18, 2010	Mount Lemmon	Mount Lemmon Survey	·	2.4 km	MPC · JPL
429342	2010 FN_{20}	—	March 18, 2010	Mount Lemmon	Mount Lemmon Survey	·	2.6 km	MPC · JPL
429343	2010 FM_{25}	—	September 11, 2007	Mount Lemmon	Mount Lemmon Survey	·	1.9 km	MPC · JPL
429344	2010 FA_{26}	—	March 19, 2010	Mount Lemmon	Mount Lemmon Survey	·	3.6 km	MPC · JPL
429345	2010 FX_{28}	—	December 20, 2009	Mount Lemmon	Mount Lemmon Survey	·	3.5 km	MPC · JPL
429346	2010 FO_{54}	—	March 12, 2010	Mount Lemmon	Mount Lemmon Survey	·	2.6 km	MPC · JPL
429347	2010 FR_{55}	—	March 25, 2010	Mount Lemmon	Mount Lemmon Survey	LIX	3.8 km	MPC · JPL
429348	2010 FN_{83}	—	March 19, 2010	Mount Lemmon	Mount Lemmon Survey	·	3.3 km	MPC · JPL
429349	2010 FY_{83}	—	March 23, 2010	Mount Lemmon	Mount Lemmon Survey	·	2.8 km	MPC · JPL
429350	2010 FS_{89}	—	March 18, 2010	Mount Lemmon	Mount Lemmon Survey	·	4.4 km	MPC · JPL
429351	2010 FS_{95}	—	March 26, 2010	Kitt Peak	Spacewatch	·	2.8 km	MPC · JPL
429352	2010 FT_{96}	—	September 12, 2007	Mount Lemmon	Mount Lemmon Survey	EOS	1.6 km	MPC · JPL
429353	2010 GJ_{24}	—	March 15, 2010	Mount Lemmon	Mount Lemmon Survey	·	2.7 km	MPC · JPL
429354	2010 GE_{28}	—	April 6, 2010	Kitt Peak	Spacewatch	·	1.8 km	MPC · JPL
429355	2010 GN_{29}	—	September 15, 2007	Mount Lemmon	Mount Lemmon Survey	EOS	2.4 km	MPC · JPL
429356	2010 GA_{65}	—	April 8, 2010	Catalina	CSS	·	3.5 km	MPC · JPL
429357	2010 GS_{66}	—	April 9, 2010	Catalina	CSS	H	590 m	MPC · JPL
429358	2010 GS_{73}	—	April 14, 2010	WISE	WISE	·	5.8 km	MPC · JPL
429359	2010 GX_{97}	—	April 10, 2010	Kitt Peak	Spacewatch	·	3.5 km	MPC · JPL
429360	2010 GH_{99}	—	April 4, 2010	Kitt Peak	Spacewatch	·	2.8 km	MPC · JPL
429361	2010 GF_{121}	—	March 16, 2010	Kitt Peak	Spacewatch	·	3.1 km	MPC · JPL
429362	2010 GQ_{122}	—	April 13, 2010	Mount Lemmon	Mount Lemmon Survey	·	4.6 km	MPC · JPL
429363	2010 GZ_{138}	—	October 10, 2007	Kitt Peak	Spacewatch	·	2.2 km	MPC · JPL
429364	2010 GC_{142}	—	March 14, 2005	Mount Lemmon	Mount Lemmon Survey	·	1.6 km	MPC · JPL
429365	2010 GW_{160}	—	April 15, 2010	Mount Lemmon	Mount Lemmon Survey	·	3.3 km	MPC · JPL
429366	2010 GH_{173}	—	September 18, 2007	Kitt Peak	Spacewatch	EOS	2.3 km	MPC · JPL
429367	2010 HD_{13}	—	January 6, 2010	Catalina	CSS	·	2.7 km	MPC · JPL
429368	2010 HC_{59}	—	January 10, 2010	Kitt Peak	Spacewatch	·	2.6 km	MPC · JPL
429369	2010 JO_{1}	—	May 4, 2010	Kitt Peak	Spacewatch	THB	2.7 km	MPC · JPL
429370	2010 JM_{16}	—	March 23, 2006	Kitt Peak	Spacewatch	·	2.7 km	MPC · JPL
429371	2010 JH_{75}	—	April 14, 2010	Mount Lemmon	Mount Lemmon Survey	·	3.9 km	MPC · JPL
429372	2010 JY_{87}	—	May 13, 2010	Mount Lemmon	Mount Lemmon Survey	·	3.2 km	MPC · JPL
429373	2010 JP_{114}	—	April 14, 2010	Kitt Peak	Spacewatch	·	3.0 km	MPC · JPL
429374	2010 JT_{148}	—	May 14, 2001	Kitt Peak	Spacewatch	·	3.3 km	MPC · JPL
429375	2010 JC_{155}	—	May 8, 2010	Mount Lemmon	Mount Lemmon Survey	·	2.6 km	MPC · JPL
429376	2010 KD_{128}	—	May 22, 2010	Mount Lemmon	Mount Lemmon Survey	·	4.5 km	MPC · JPL
429377	2010 LP_{24}	—	March 20, 2010	Mount Lemmon	Mount Lemmon Survey	EOS	4.5 km	MPC · JPL
429378	2010 LZ_{31}	—	June 6, 2010	WISE	WISE	·	1.6 km	MPC · JPL
429379	2010 LL_{64}	—	November 24, 2008	Mount Lemmon	Mount Lemmon Survey	THB	2.7 km	MPC · JPL
429380	2010 MC_{5}	—	February 16, 2007	Catalina	CSS	H	680 m	MPC · JPL
429381	2010 NZ_{65}	—	December 30, 2007	Kitt Peak	Spacewatch	EOS	2.5 km	MPC · JPL
429382	2010 NW_{117}	—	July 8, 2010	Kitt Peak	Spacewatch	AMO	450 m	MPC · JPL
429383	2010 OV_{62}	—	July 24, 2010	WISE	WISE	·	4.8 km	MPC · JPL
429384	2010 ON_{70}	—	July 25, 2010	WISE	WISE	EMA	3.6 km	MPC · JPL
429385	2010 OM_{79}	—	July 26, 2010	WISE	WISE	·	3.9 km	MPC · JPL
429386	2010 ON_{86}	—	July 27, 2010	WISE	WISE	·	4.3 km	MPC · JPL
429387	2010 OH_{116}	—	June 16, 2010	Kitt Peak	Spacewatch	PHO	1.5 km	MPC · JPL
429388	2010 OD_{123}	—	November 8, 2007	Kitt Peak	Spacewatch	THM	2.8 km	MPC · JPL
429389	2010 PR_{10}	—	August 6, 2010	Siding Spring	SSS	APO	170 m	MPC · JPL
429390	2010 PF_{70}	—	December 19, 2003	Socorro	LINEAR	·	1.5 km	MPC · JPL
429391	2010 PW_{77}	—	August 12, 2010	Kitt Peak	Spacewatch	·	880 m	MPC · JPL
429392	2010 PU_{78}	—	August 14, 2010	Kitt Peak	Spacewatch	·	590 m	MPC · JPL
429393	2010 RT_{12}	—	September 1, 2010	Socorro	LINEAR	·	1.0 km	MPC · JPL
429394	2010 RJ_{47}	—	January 13, 2008	Kitt Peak	Spacewatch	·	470 m	MPC · JPL
429395	2010 RK_{49}	—	September 4, 2010	Socorro	LINEAR	·	790 m	MPC · JPL
429396	2010 RL_{58}	—	August 13, 2010	Kitt Peak	Spacewatch	·	580 m	MPC · JPL
429397	2010 RB_{78}	—	October 6, 2000	Anderson Mesa	LONEOS	·	730 m	MPC · JPL
429398	2010 RE_{78}	—	September 19, 2003	Campo Imperatore	CINEOS	·	750 m	MPC · JPL
429399	2010 RK_{103}	—	September 10, 2010	Kitt Peak	Spacewatch	·	520 m	MPC · JPL
429400	2010 RC_{128}	—	November 7, 2007	Mount Lemmon	Mount Lemmon Survey	·	790 m	MPC · JPL

== 429401–429500 ==
back to top

Designation			Discovery			Properties		Ref
Permanent	Provisional	Named after	Date	Site	Discoverer(s)	Category	Diam.	Ref
429401	2010 RC_{166}	—	September 10, 2010	Kitt Peak	Spacewatch	·	630 m	MPC · JPL
429402	2010 SZ_{38}	—	September 8, 2010	Kitt Peak	Spacewatch	·	800 m	MPC · JPL
429403	2010 TC_{2}	—	December 28, 2007	Kitt Peak	Spacewatch	·	760 m	MPC · JPL
429404	2010 TJ_{18}	—	November 2, 2007	Kitt Peak	Spacewatch	·	610 m	MPC · JPL
429405	2010 TE_{48}	—	February 9, 2008	Kitt Peak	Spacewatch	·	1.0 km	MPC · JPL
429406	2010 TK_{95}	—	March 4, 2008	Mount Lemmon	Mount Lemmon Survey	·	1.6 km	MPC · JPL
429407	2010 TQ_{105}	—	December 5, 2007	Kitt Peak	Spacewatch	·	570 m	MPC · JPL
429408	2010 TB_{116}	—	October 9, 2010	Catalina	CSS	·	730 m	MPC · JPL
429409	2010 TA_{138}	—	October 11, 2010	Mount Lemmon	Mount Lemmon Survey	·	1.3 km	MPC · JPL
429410	2010 TZ_{138}	—	October 11, 2010	Mount Lemmon	Mount Lemmon Survey	L4	8.1 km	MPC · JPL
429411	2010 TW_{140}	—	October 21, 2003	Kitt Peak	Spacewatch	·	760 m	MPC · JPL
429412	2010 TP_{146}	—	September 16, 2010	Mount Lemmon	Mount Lemmon Survey	·	1.0 km	MPC · JPL
429413	2010 TS_{146}	—	January 16, 2005	Kitt Peak	Spacewatch	·	660 m	MPC · JPL
429414	2010 TO_{176}	—	October 9, 2010	Catalina	CSS	·	750 m	MPC · JPL
429415	2010 TY_{176}	—	November 16, 2003	Catalina	CSS	PHO	920 m	MPC · JPL
429416	2010 TU_{181}	—	October 1, 2000	Socorro	LINEAR	·	690 m	MPC · JPL
429417	2010 UU_{5}	—	January 18, 2008	Mount Lemmon	Mount Lemmon Survey	·	650 m	MPC · JPL
429418	2010 UT_{10}	—	October 17, 2010	Mount Lemmon	Mount Lemmon Survey	·	600 m	MPC · JPL
429419	2010 UD_{13}	—	September 6, 1999	Kitt Peak	Spacewatch	·	840 m	MPC · JPL
429420	2010 UW_{22}	—	November 26, 2003	Kitt Peak	Spacewatch	·	860 m	MPC · JPL
429421	2010 UD_{41}	—	February 12, 2008	Kitt Peak	Spacewatch	·	950 m	MPC · JPL
429422	2010 UM_{51}	—	October 28, 2010	Kitt Peak	Spacewatch	·	940 m	MPC · JPL
429423	2010 US_{52}	—	October 13, 2010	Mount Lemmon	Mount Lemmon Survey	L4	8.1 km	MPC · JPL
429424	2010 UZ_{60}	—	December 31, 2007	Mount Lemmon	Mount Lemmon Survey	·	550 m	MPC · JPL
429425	2010 UX_{62}	—	October 30, 2010	Catalina	CSS	·	790 m	MPC · JPL
429426	2010 UT_{65}	—	December 30, 2007	Kitt Peak	Spacewatch	·	690 m	MPC · JPL
429427	2010 UO_{70}	—	February 28, 2008	Mount Lemmon	Mount Lemmon Survey	·	920 m	MPC · JPL
429428	2010 UX_{74}	—	December 19, 2007	Mount Lemmon	Mount Lemmon Survey	·	820 m	MPC · JPL
429429	2010 UV_{77}	—	October 13, 2010	Mount Lemmon	Mount Lemmon Survey	·	650 m	MPC · JPL
429430	2010 UT_{93}	—	October 13, 2010	Mount Lemmon	Mount Lemmon Survey	·	760 m	MPC · JPL
429431	2010 UX_{101}	—	October 19, 2003	Kitt Peak	Spacewatch	(2076)	750 m	MPC · JPL
429432	2010 VZ_{14}	—	November 1, 2010	Kitt Peak	Spacewatch	V	750 m	MPC · JPL
429433	2010 VF_{16}	—	August 21, 2006	Kitt Peak	Spacewatch	·	1.0 km	MPC · JPL
429434	2010 VT_{22}	—	October 12, 2010	Mount Lemmon	Mount Lemmon Survey	·	570 m	MPC · JPL
429435	2010 VE_{31}	—	November 3, 2010	Mount Lemmon	Mount Lemmon Survey	·	700 m	MPC · JPL
429436	2010 VF_{32}	—	October 11, 2010	Catalina	CSS	·	830 m	MPC · JPL
429437	2010 VN_{45}	—	September 22, 1995	Kitt Peak	Spacewatch	MAS	610 m	MPC · JPL
429438	2010 VL_{54}	—	January 28, 2004	Kitt Peak	Spacewatch	·	870 m	MPC · JPL
429439	2010 VE_{56}	—	November 19, 2003	Kitt Peak	Spacewatch	·	790 m	MPC · JPL
429440	2010 VR_{61}	—	January 10, 1997	Kitt Peak	Spacewatch	NYS	930 m	MPC · JPL
429441	2010 VW_{71}	—	January 12, 2008	Mount Lemmon	Mount Lemmon Survey	·	870 m	MPC · JPL
429442	2010 VV_{79}	—	November 3, 2010	Mount Lemmon	Mount Lemmon Survey	L4	10 km	MPC · JPL
429443	2010 VP_{83}	—	March 29, 2008	Kitt Peak	Spacewatch	·	860 m	MPC · JPL
429444	2010 VS_{100}	—	December 18, 2007	Mount Lemmon	Mount Lemmon Survey	·	710 m	MPC · JPL
429445	2010 VU_{111}	—	November 30, 2003	Kitt Peak	Spacewatch	·	850 m	MPC · JPL
429446	2010 VU_{114}	—	January 14, 2008	Kitt Peak	Spacewatch	·	660 m	MPC · JPL
429447	2010 VG_{118}	—	October 10, 1999	Socorro	LINEAR	·	910 m	MPC · JPL
429448	2010 VL_{124}	—	December 18, 2007	Mount Lemmon	Mount Lemmon Survey	·	480 m	MPC · JPL
429449	2010 VA_{127}	—	January 11, 2008	Mount Lemmon	Mount Lemmon Survey	·	620 m	MPC · JPL
429450	2010 VK_{131}	—	November 11, 2007	Mount Lemmon	Mount Lemmon Survey	·	730 m	MPC · JPL
429451	2010 VX_{159}	—	February 8, 2008	Kitt Peak	Spacewatch	·	660 m	MPC · JPL
429452	2010 VG_{161}	—	November 10, 2010	Kitt Peak	Spacewatch	·	730 m	MPC · JPL
429453	2010 VS_{172}	—	January 19, 2004	Kitt Peak	Spacewatch	MAS	540 m	MPC · JPL
429454	2010 VW_{172}	—	September 25, 2006	Kitt Peak	Spacewatch	MAS	560 m	MPC · JPL
429455	2010 VP_{189}	—	March 10, 2008	Kitt Peak	Spacewatch	NYS	860 m	MPC · JPL
429456	2010 VD_{205}	—	October 19, 2010	Mount Lemmon	Mount Lemmon Survey	·	800 m	MPC · JPL
429457	2010 VG_{213}	—	October 31, 2010	Kitt Peak	Spacewatch	·	930 m	MPC · JPL
429458	2010 VR_{215}	—	July 25, 2003	Campo Imperatore	CINEOS	·	730 m	MPC · JPL
429459	2010 VK_{216}	—	February 9, 2008	Mount Lemmon	Mount Lemmon Survey	·	740 m	MPC · JPL
429460	2010 VQ_{216}	—	November 1, 2010	Kitt Peak	Spacewatch	·	570 m	MPC · JPL
429461	2010 WD_{28}	—	October 29, 2010	Kitt Peak	Spacewatch	·	930 m	MPC · JPL
429462	2010 WA_{31}	—	February 28, 2008	Kitt Peak	Spacewatch	MAS	600 m	MPC · JPL
429463	2010 WY_{39}	—	January 10, 2008	Mount Lemmon	Mount Lemmon Survey	·	1.3 km	MPC · JPL
429464	2010 WK_{52}	—	December 21, 2003	Kitt Peak	Spacewatch	MAS	530 m	MPC · JPL
429465	2010 WY_{54}	—	November 11, 2010	Kitt Peak	Spacewatch	·	1 km	MPC · JPL
429466	2010 WW_{64}	—	October 2, 2006	Kitt Peak	Spacewatch	NYS	770 m	MPC · JPL
429467	2010 WQ_{69}	—	November 10, 2010	Mount Lemmon	Mount Lemmon Survey	NYS	910 m	MPC · JPL
429468	2010 XK_{17}	—	November 7, 2010	Mount Lemmon	Mount Lemmon Survey	·	930 m	MPC · JPL
429469	2010 XW_{17}	—	November 18, 2006	Mount Lemmon	Mount Lemmon Survey	·	1.1 km	MPC · JPL
429470	2010 XA_{49}	—	October 13, 2006	Kitt Peak	Spacewatch	·	1.1 km	MPC · JPL
429471	2010 XE_{56}	—	February 8, 2008	Kitt Peak	Spacewatch	·	840 m	MPC · JPL
429472	2010 XT_{66}	—	December 19, 2003	Socorro	LINEAR	·	870 m	MPC · JPL
429473	2010 XC_{67}	—	December 28, 2003	Kitt Peak	Spacewatch	·	930 m	MPC · JPL
429474	2010 XB_{71}	—	November 13, 2010	Mount Lemmon	Mount Lemmon Survey	·	800 m	MPC · JPL
429475	2010 YS_{2}	—	September 17, 2006	Kitt Peak	Spacewatch	·	690 m	MPC · JPL
429476	2011 AA_{1}	—	December 6, 2010	Mount Lemmon	Mount Lemmon Survey	·	1.2 km	MPC · JPL
429477	2011 AD_{6}	—	March 28, 2008	Mount Lemmon	Mount Lemmon Survey	V	600 m	MPC · JPL
429478	2011 AV_{7}	—	November 10, 2006	Kitt Peak	Spacewatch	MAS	700 m	MPC · JPL
429479	2011 AR_{15}	—	October 29, 2003	Kitt Peak	Spacewatch	·	720 m	MPC · JPL
429480	2011 AR_{18}	—	January 8, 2011	Mount Lemmon	Mount Lemmon Survey	·	1.6 km	MPC · JPL
429481	2011 AU_{20}	—	December 26, 2006	Kitt Peak	Spacewatch	·	830 m	MPC · JPL
429482	2011 AD_{21}	—	September 17, 2009	Mount Lemmon	Mount Lemmon Survey	·	1.4 km	MPC · JPL
429483	2011 AA_{22}	—	October 23, 2005	Catalina	CSS	·	1.9 km	MPC · JPL
429484	2011 AU_{30}	—	April 14, 2004	Kitt Peak	Spacewatch	·	970 m	MPC · JPL
429485	2011 AF_{31}	—	January 9, 2011	Kitt Peak	Spacewatch	MAS	680 m	MPC · JPL
429486	2011 AO_{32}	—	October 21, 2006	Kitt Peak	Spacewatch	·	900 m	MPC · JPL
429487	2011 AX_{35}	—	November 17, 2006	Kitt Peak	Spacewatch	·	1.2 km	MPC · JPL
429488	2011 AX_{40}	—	November 27, 2006	Mount Lemmon	Mount Lemmon Survey	·	1.2 km	MPC · JPL
429489	2011 AD_{44}	—	December 8, 2010	Mount Lemmon	Mount Lemmon Survey	NYS	1.1 km	MPC · JPL
429490	2011 AH_{44}	—	January 10, 2011	Kitt Peak	Spacewatch	MAS	720 m	MPC · JPL
429491	2011 AL_{44}	—	November 17, 2006	Kitt Peak	Spacewatch	·	1.1 km	MPC · JPL
429492	2011 AZ_{52}	—	December 1, 2006	Kitt Peak	Spacewatch	·	950 m	MPC · JPL
429493	2011 AF_{53}	—	January 11, 2011	Kitt Peak	Spacewatch	BRA	2.0 km	MPC · JPL
429494	2011 AB_{54}	—	December 1, 2006	Mount Lemmon	Mount Lemmon Survey	(6769)	860 m	MPC · JPL
429495	2011 AA_{56}	—	August 16, 2009	Kitt Peak	Spacewatch	V	660 m	MPC · JPL
429496	2011 AT_{57}	—	November 27, 2006	Kitt Peak	Spacewatch	·	1.0 km	MPC · JPL
429497	2011 AX_{57}	—	December 5, 2010	Mount Lemmon	Mount Lemmon Survey	·	1.1 km	MPC · JPL
429498	2011 AK_{58}	—	October 21, 2006	Kitt Peak	Spacewatch	NYS	990 m	MPC · JPL
429499	2011 AG_{68}	—	January 14, 2011	Kitt Peak	Spacewatch	KON	2.1 km	MPC · JPL
429500	2011 AX_{68}	—	December 13, 2006	Mount Lemmon	Mount Lemmon Survey	·	1.1 km	MPC · JPL

== 429501–429600 ==
back to top

Designation			Discovery			Properties		Ref
Permanent	Provisional	Named after	Date	Site	Discoverer(s)	Category	Diam.	Ref
429501	2011 AQ_{76}	—	January 9, 2011	Kitt Peak	Spacewatch	MAS	760 m	MPC · JPL
429502	2011 BZ_{2}	—	March 3, 2000	Socorro	LINEAR	·	900 m	MPC · JPL
429503	2011 BP_{3}	—	March 18, 2004	Socorro	LINEAR	·	1.4 km	MPC · JPL
429504	2011 BN_{9}	—	November 15, 2010	Mount Lemmon	Mount Lemmon Survey	·	990 m	MPC · JPL
429505	2011 BM_{12}	—	October 6, 2005	Kitt Peak	Spacewatch	·	1.6 km	MPC · JPL
429506	2011 BS_{13}	—	January 8, 2011	Mount Lemmon	Mount Lemmon Survey	·	1.3 km	MPC · JPL
429507	2011 BH_{15}	—	September 16, 2009	Mount Lemmon	Mount Lemmon Survey	·	1.4 km	MPC · JPL
429508	2011 BO_{17}	—	January 25, 2011	Kitt Peak	Spacewatch	·	1.3 km	MPC · JPL
429509	2011 BE_{18}	—	February 2, 2008	Kitt Peak	Spacewatch	·	1 km	MPC · JPL
429510	2011 BR_{20}	—	March 11, 2008	Mount Lemmon	Mount Lemmon Survey	·	900 m	MPC · JPL
429511	2011 BG_{21}	—	January 9, 2007	Mount Lemmon	Mount Lemmon Survey	·	900 m	MPC · JPL
429512	2011 BM_{25}	—	November 2, 2010	Mount Lemmon	Mount Lemmon Survey	·	2.6 km	MPC · JPL
429513	2011 BO_{26}	—	December 13, 2006	Mount Lemmon	Mount Lemmon Survey	NYS	960 m	MPC · JPL
429514	2011 BC_{28}	—	November 17, 2006	Mount Lemmon	Mount Lemmon Survey	·	1.3 km	MPC · JPL
429515	2011 BU_{30}	—	December 21, 2006	Kitt Peak	Spacewatch	·	1.3 km	MPC · JPL
429516	2011 BA_{32}	—	January 8, 2007	Mount Lemmon	Mount Lemmon Survey	·	1.2 km	MPC · JPL
429517	2011 BG_{37}	—	September 17, 2009	Kitt Peak	Spacewatch	·	1.4 km	MPC · JPL
429518	2011 BG_{48}	—	December 12, 2006	Kitt Peak	Spacewatch	·	800 m	MPC · JPL
429519	2011 BB_{52}	—	March 12, 2007	Catalina	CSS	·	1.6 km	MPC · JPL
429520	2011 BG_{53}	—	November 17, 2006	Kitt Peak	Spacewatch	·	1.1 km	MPC · JPL
429521	2011 BB_{63}	—	July 29, 2008	Kitt Peak	Spacewatch	·	1.6 km	MPC · JPL
429522	2011 BU_{63}	—	February 8, 2007	Kitt Peak	Spacewatch	·	2.9 km	MPC · JPL
429523	2011 BV_{65}	—	December 21, 2006	Kitt Peak	Spacewatch	·	1.2 km	MPC · JPL
429524	2011 BZ_{70}	—	August 8, 2004	Socorro	LINEAR	EUN	1.3 km	MPC · JPL
429525	2011 BN_{78}	—	December 9, 2006	Kitt Peak	Spacewatch	·	1.2 km	MPC · JPL
429526	2011 BK_{80}	—	January 27, 2007	Mount Lemmon	Mount Lemmon Survey	·	1.5 km	MPC · JPL
429527	2011 BL_{80}	—	October 27, 2009	Mount Lemmon	Mount Lemmon Survey	·	1.5 km	MPC · JPL
429528	2011 BO_{81}	—	November 6, 2010	Kitt Peak	Spacewatch	RAF	940 m	MPC · JPL
429529	2011 BN_{87}	—	January 17, 2007	Kitt Peak	Spacewatch	·	920 m	MPC · JPL
429530	2011 BG_{92}	—	July 29, 2009	Kitt Peak	Spacewatch	V	820 m	MPC · JPL
429531	2011 BN_{95}	—	December 13, 2006	Kitt Peak	Spacewatch	·	1.2 km	MPC · JPL
429532	2011 BW_{95}	—	July 28, 2008	Siding Spring	SSS	·	2.7 km	MPC · JPL
429533	2011 BM_{114}	—	February 8, 2000	Kitt Peak	Spacewatch	·	1.1 km	MPC · JPL
429534	2011 BM_{116}	—	March 31, 2004	Kitt Peak	Spacewatch	·	1.2 km	MPC · JPL
429535	2011 BH_{132}	—	March 16, 2004	Kitt Peak	Spacewatch	·	1.1 km	MPC · JPL
429536	2011 BS_{133}	—	March 8, 2008	Mount Lemmon	Mount Lemmon Survey	·	750 m	MPC · JPL
429537	2011 BB_{141}	—	January 8, 2011	Mount Lemmon	Mount Lemmon Survey	·	1.1 km	MPC · JPL
429538	2011 CM_{1}	—	April 23, 2004	Socorro	LINEAR	·	1.4 km	MPC · JPL
429539	2011 CS_{1}	—	April 20, 2004	Socorro	LINEAR	·	1.3 km	MPC · JPL
429540	2011 CL_{3}	—	December 14, 2006	Kitt Peak	Spacewatch	·	1.3 km	MPC · JPL
429541	2011 CB_{4}	—	April 25, 2004	Kitt Peak	Spacewatch	NYS	910 m	MPC · JPL
429542	2011 CF_{5}	—	December 9, 2010	Mount Lemmon	Mount Lemmon Survey	·	1.1 km	MPC · JPL
429543	2011 CG_{7}	—	November 15, 2010	Mount Lemmon	Mount Lemmon Survey	MAS	920 m	MPC · JPL
429544	2011 CM_{9}	—	January 28, 2007	Mount Lemmon	Mount Lemmon Survey	·	1.0 km	MPC · JPL
429545	2011 CL_{16}	—	March 14, 2007	Anderson Mesa	LONEOS	·	1.7 km	MPC · JPL
429546	2011 CU_{17}	—	November 1, 2005	Mount Lemmon	Mount Lemmon Survey	·	1.5 km	MPC · JPL
429547	2011 CD_{18}	—	December 10, 2010	Mount Lemmon	Mount Lemmon Survey	·	2.2 km	MPC · JPL
429548	2011 CF_{28}	—	December 6, 2010	Mount Lemmon	Mount Lemmon Survey	·	1.3 km	MPC · JPL
429549	2011 CY_{32}	—	January 15, 2011	Mount Lemmon	Mount Lemmon Survey	·	1.8 km	MPC · JPL
429550	2011 CB_{34}	—	January 17, 2007	Kitt Peak	Spacewatch	·	1.2 km	MPC · JPL
429551	2011 CR_{34}	—	January 28, 2000	Kitt Peak	Spacewatch	·	1.1 km	MPC · JPL
429552	2011 CL_{37}	—	April 13, 2004	Kitt Peak	Spacewatch	CLA	1.8 km	MPC · JPL
429553	2011 CR_{39}	—	November 16, 2006	Kitt Peak	Spacewatch	·	1.0 km	MPC · JPL
429554	2011 CM_{54}	—	February 21, 2007	Kitt Peak	Spacewatch	·	940 m	MPC · JPL
429555	2011 CM_{56}	—	January 27, 2011	Mount Lemmon	Mount Lemmon Survey	EUN	1.5 km	MPC · JPL
429556	2011 CW_{72}	—	February 5, 2011	Catalina	CSS	EUN	1.6 km	MPC · JPL
429557	2011 CE_{74}	—	March 25, 2007	Mount Lemmon	Mount Lemmon Survey	JUN	1.2 km	MPC · JPL
429558	2011 CB_{75}	—	November 7, 2002	Kitt Peak	Spacewatch	·	1.3 km	MPC · JPL
429559	2011 CM_{76}	—	December 11, 2010	Mount Lemmon	Mount Lemmon Survey	·	1.2 km	MPC · JPL
429560	2011 CS_{84}	—	January 18, 1998	Kitt Peak	Spacewatch	·	1.3 km	MPC · JPL
429561	2011 CX_{85}	—	January 27, 2011	Kitt Peak	Spacewatch	·	1.6 km	MPC · JPL
429562	2011 CK_{86}	—	March 23, 2003	Kitt Peak	Spacewatch	·	1.0 km	MPC · JPL
429563	2011 CO_{89}	—	January 24, 2007	Mount Lemmon	Mount Lemmon Survey	·	1.4 km	MPC · JPL
429564	2011 CZ_{104}	—	November 1, 2005	Kitt Peak	Spacewatch	·	1.0 km	MPC · JPL
429565	2011 CK_{106}	—	October 25, 2005	Kitt Peak	Spacewatch	·	860 m	MPC · JPL
429566	2011 DK_{8}	—	April 23, 2007	Kitt Peak	Spacewatch	·	1.0 km	MPC · JPL
429567	2011 DY_{8}	—	February 22, 2011	Kitt Peak	Spacewatch	·	1.2 km	MPC · JPL
429568	2011 DC_{21}	—	September 22, 2009	Mount Lemmon	Mount Lemmon Survey	·	890 m	MPC · JPL
429569	2011 DT_{26}	—	January 10, 2007	Mount Lemmon	Mount Lemmon Survey	·	1.1 km	MPC · JPL
429570	2011 DZ_{37}	—	February 25, 2011	Mount Lemmon	Mount Lemmon Survey	·	1.4 km	MPC · JPL
429571	2011 DL_{42}	—	August 26, 2000	Cerro Tololo	Deep Ecliptic Survey	BRG	1.9 km	MPC · JPL
429572	2011 EF_{1}	—	January 28, 2007	Kitt Peak	Spacewatch	·	2.9 km	MPC · JPL
429573	2011 EK_{1}	—	August 17, 2009	Kitt Peak	Spacewatch	·	1.3 km	MPC · JPL
429574	2011 EP_{3}	—	October 21, 2009	Mount Lemmon	Mount Lemmon Survey	·	1.2 km	MPC · JPL
429575	2011 EW_{6}	—	August 27, 2009	Kitt Peak	Spacewatch	·	1.1 km	MPC · JPL
429576	2011 EF_{7}	—	January 16, 2011	Mount Lemmon	Mount Lemmon Survey	NYS	960 m	MPC · JPL
429577	2011 EP_{8}	—	December 15, 2006	Kitt Peak	Spacewatch	NYS	1.1 km	MPC · JPL
429578	2011 EC_{14}	—	December 7, 2005	Catalina	CSS	·	2.6 km	MPC · JPL
429579	2011 EO_{16}	—	November 26, 2009	Mount Lemmon	Mount Lemmon Survey	·	1.5 km	MPC · JPL
429580	2011 EC_{19}	—	March 14, 2007	Kitt Peak	Spacewatch	·	890 m	MPC · JPL
429581	2011 ET_{22}	—	March 13, 2007	Kitt Peak	Spacewatch	·	1.1 km	MPC · JPL
429582	2011 EE_{23}	—	May 6, 2003	Kitt Peak	Spacewatch	·	1.0 km	MPC · JPL
429583	2011 EL_{28}	—	December 27, 2005	Kitt Peak	Spacewatch	·	1.6 km	MPC · JPL
429584	2011 EU_{29}	—	March 8, 2011	Socorro	LINEAR	APO · PHA	390 m	MPC · JPL
429585	2011 EQ_{36}	—	February 13, 2010	WISE	WISE	·	1.7 km	MPC · JPL
429586	2011 ET_{38}	—	March 6, 2011	Kitt Peak	Spacewatch	·	2.0 km	MPC · JPL
429587	2011 EP_{39}	—	November 17, 2009	Mount Lemmon	Mount Lemmon Survey	·	1.2 km	MPC · JPL
429588	2011 EJ_{40}	—	March 29, 2007	Kitt Peak	Spacewatch	·	1.0 km	MPC · JPL
429589	2011 ED_{46}	—	April 20, 2007	Kitt Peak	Spacewatch	·	1.5 km	MPC · JPL
429590	2011 EY_{53}	—	March 9, 2011	Kitt Peak	Spacewatch	·	1.8 km	MPC · JPL
429591	2011 EB_{55}	—	September 10, 2004	Kitt Peak	Spacewatch	·	2.1 km	MPC · JPL
429592	2011 EV_{61}	—	November 17, 2009	Mount Lemmon	Mount Lemmon Survey	·	1.3 km	MPC · JPL
429593	2011 EV_{63}	—	February 23, 2007	Kitt Peak	Spacewatch	·	1.4 km	MPC · JPL
429594	2011 EB_{68}	—	October 7, 2004	Kitt Peak	Spacewatch	EUN	1.1 km	MPC · JPL
429595	2011 EE_{69}	—	March 10, 2011	Kitt Peak	Spacewatch	·	1.8 km	MPC · JPL
429596	2011 EA_{70}	—	October 21, 2004	Socorro	LINEAR	·	2.6 km	MPC · JPL
429597	2011 EO_{71}	—	March 19, 2010	WISE	WISE	·	2.1 km	MPC · JPL
429598	2011 EQ_{71}	—	March 13, 2007	Mount Lemmon	Mount Lemmon Survey	·	1.4 km	MPC · JPL
429599	2011 EZ_{75}	—	November 12, 2005	Kitt Peak	Spacewatch	(5)	1.3 km	MPC · JPL
429600	2011 EM_{76}	—	March 5, 2011	Catalina	CSS	·	1.7 km	MPC · JPL

== 429601–429700 ==
back to top

Designation			Discovery			Properties		Ref
Permanent	Provisional	Named after	Date	Site	Discoverer(s)	Category	Diam.	Ref
429601	2011 EJ_{77}	—	October 2, 2009	Mount Lemmon	Mount Lemmon Survey	·	1.7 km	MPC · JPL
429602	2011 EF_{80}	—	September 29, 2009	Mount Lemmon	Mount Lemmon Survey	·	1.2 km	MPC · JPL
429603	2011 EX_{84}	—	April 15, 2007	Kitt Peak	Spacewatch	·	1.7 km	MPC · JPL
429604	2011 FP_{3}	—	February 9, 2011	Mount Lemmon	Mount Lemmon Survey	·	2.1 km	MPC · JPL
429605	2011 FQ_{3}	—	September 23, 2008	Mount Lemmon	Mount Lemmon Survey	DOR	2.7 km	MPC · JPL
429606	2011 FE_{4}	—	October 8, 2004	Kitt Peak	Spacewatch	·	1.8 km	MPC · JPL
429607	2011 FD_{7}	—	March 26, 2007	Kitt Peak	Spacewatch	·	990 m	MPC · JPL
429608	2011 FH_{7}	—	March 4, 2011	Kitt Peak	Spacewatch	DOR	2.5 km	MPC · JPL
429609	2011 FH_{11}	—	November 19, 2009	Catalina	CSS	·	1.4 km	MPC · JPL
429610	2011 FW_{11}	—	November 9, 2009	Mount Lemmon	Mount Lemmon Survey	·	1.7 km	MPC · JPL
429611	2011 FS_{13}	—	April 26, 2003	Kitt Peak	Spacewatch	·	1.1 km	MPC · JPL
429612	2011 FG_{18}	—	December 2, 2005	Mount Lemmon	Mount Lemmon Survey	·	1.3 km	MPC · JPL
429613	2011 FB_{19}	—	April 18, 2007	Kitt Peak	Spacewatch	·	1.4 km	MPC · JPL
429614	2011 FK_{19}	—	March 6, 2011	Kitt Peak	Spacewatch	·	2.3 km	MPC · JPL
429615	2011 FO_{22}	—	December 11, 2009	Mount Lemmon	Mount Lemmon Survey	·	1.7 km	MPC · JPL
429616	2011 FD_{23}	—	January 27, 2007	Kitt Peak	Spacewatch	·	1.8 km	MPC · JPL
429617	2011 FT_{30}	—	October 1, 2008	Kitt Peak	Spacewatch	(13314)	1.9 km	MPC · JPL
429618	2011 FK_{32}	—	December 10, 2005	Kitt Peak	Spacewatch	·	1.5 km	MPC · JPL
429619	2011 FB_{33}	—	September 27, 2008	Mount Lemmon	Mount Lemmon Survey	·	1.5 km	MPC · JPL
429620	2011 FP_{34}	—	April 25, 2007	Mount Lemmon	Mount Lemmon Survey	·	1.5 km	MPC · JPL
429621	2011 FG_{38}	—	August 22, 1995	Kitt Peak	Spacewatch	·	1.7 km	MPC · JPL
429622	2011 FD_{39}	—	September 11, 2004	Kitt Peak	Spacewatch	·	1.4 km	MPC · JPL
429623	2011 FK_{44}	—	March 15, 2007	Kitt Peak	Spacewatch	·	850 m	MPC · JPL
429624	2011 FV_{44}	—	March 20, 2007	Kitt Peak	Spacewatch	·	750 m	MPC · JPL
429625	2011 FE_{54}	—	September 11, 2004	Kitt Peak	Spacewatch	·	1.6 km	MPC · JPL
429626	2011 FG_{60}	—	March 11, 2011	Kitt Peak	Spacewatch	JUN	1.1 km	MPC · JPL
429627	2011 FN_{64}	—	March 4, 2011	Kitt Peak	Spacewatch	·	1.7 km	MPC · JPL
429628	2011 FR_{67}	—	January 10, 2006	Kitt Peak	Spacewatch	·	1.7 km	MPC · JPL
429629	2011 FG_{68}	—	April 20, 2007	Kitt Peak	Spacewatch	·	1.6 km	MPC · JPL
429630	2011 FM_{80}	—	September 19, 2008	Kitt Peak	Spacewatch	·	1.8 km	MPC · JPL
429631	2011 FN_{80}	—	October 5, 2004	Kitt Peak	Spacewatch	·	1.9 km	MPC · JPL
429632	2011 FU_{92}	—	September 16, 2003	Kitt Peak	Spacewatch	·	1.6 km	MPC · JPL
429633	2011 FO_{93}	—	March 4, 2011	Kitt Peak	Spacewatch	·	1.4 km	MPC · JPL
429634	2011 FB_{105}	—	November 21, 2009	Catalina	CSS	·	2.2 km	MPC · JPL
429635	2011 FZ_{110}	—	October 23, 2004	Kitt Peak	Spacewatch	·	2.3 km	MPC · JPL
429636	2011 FH_{120}	—	January 11, 2011	Mount Lemmon	Mount Lemmon Survey	·	1.7 km	MPC · JPL
429637	2011 FP_{120}	—	April 19, 2007	Kitt Peak	Spacewatch	·	1.1 km	MPC · JPL
429638	2011 FW_{131}	—	March 12, 2007	Kitt Peak	Spacewatch	·	960 m	MPC · JPL
429639	2011 FB_{134}	—	October 22, 2009	Mount Lemmon	Mount Lemmon Survey	·	1.1 km	MPC · JPL
429640	2011 FT_{134}	—	February 10, 2011	Mount Lemmon	Mount Lemmon Survey	·	1.4 km	MPC · JPL
429641	2011 FX_{138}	—	February 10, 2011	Mount Lemmon	Mount Lemmon Survey	EUN	900 m	MPC · JPL
429642	2011 FK_{143}	—	December 6, 2005	Kitt Peak	Spacewatch	·	1.3 km	MPC · JPL
429643	2011 FQ_{144}	—	October 2, 2008	Kitt Peak	Spacewatch	·	1.4 km	MPC · JPL
429644	2011 FV_{147}	—	September 23, 2008	Kitt Peak	Spacewatch	·	1.9 km	MPC · JPL
429645	2011 FH_{148}	—	October 29, 2008	Kitt Peak	Spacewatch	·	1.6 km	MPC · JPL
429646	2011 FB_{150}	—	April 25, 2007	Kitt Peak	Spacewatch	KON	2.4 km	MPC · JPL
429647	2011 FX_{155}	—	March 10, 2007	Kitt Peak	Spacewatch	·	1.2 km	MPC · JPL
429648	2011 GT_{1}	—	November 8, 2009	Mount Lemmon	Mount Lemmon Survey	·	1.1 km	MPC · JPL
429649	2011 GU_{3}	—	November 20, 2009	Kitt Peak	Spacewatch	fast	3.2 km	MPC · JPL
429650	2011 GF_{4}	—	March 1, 2011	Mount Lemmon	Mount Lemmon Survey	EUN	1.3 km	MPC · JPL
429651	2011 GE_{12}	—	March 3, 2006	Kitt Peak	Spacewatch	AGN	1 km	MPC · JPL
429652	2011 GG_{13}	—	September 21, 2008	Kitt Peak	Spacewatch	·	1.7 km	MPC · JPL
429653	2011 GF_{25}	—	October 26, 2008	Mount Lemmon	Mount Lemmon Survey	·	1.6 km	MPC · JPL
429654	2011 GR_{27}	—	April 22, 2007	Mount Lemmon	Mount Lemmon Survey	EUN	1.1 km	MPC · JPL
429655	2011 GS_{31}	—	October 10, 2004	Kitt Peak	Spacewatch	MAR	1.3 km	MPC · JPL
429656	2011 GK_{32}	—	September 2, 2008	Kitt Peak	Spacewatch	·	1.8 km	MPC · JPL
429657	2011 GF_{44}	—	March 11, 2007	Mount Lemmon	Mount Lemmon Survey	·	780 m	MPC · JPL
429658	2011 GP_{45}	—	September 7, 2008	Mount Lemmon	Mount Lemmon Survey	·	1.4 km	MPC · JPL
429659	2011 GR_{46}	—	December 28, 2000	Kitt Peak	Spacewatch	·	2.5 km	MPC · JPL
429660	2011 GJ_{53}	—	March 14, 2011	Catalina	CSS	EUN	1.4 km	MPC · JPL
429661	2011 GK_{55}	—	March 13, 2010	WISE	WISE	·	1.7 km	MPC · JPL
429662	2011 GR_{60}	—	March 2, 2011	Kitt Peak	Spacewatch	·	2.0 km	MPC · JPL
429663	2011 GZ_{60}	—	May 7, 2007	Kitt Peak	Spacewatch	EUN	1.1 km	MPC · JPL
429664	2011 GA_{61}	—	April 6, 2011	Mount Lemmon	Mount Lemmon Survey	·	2.4 km	MPC · JPL
429665	2011 GW_{61}	—	August 18, 2003	Campo Imperatore	CINEOS	·	1.5 km	MPC · JPL
429666	2011 GL_{64}	—	March 26, 2011	Mount Lemmon	Mount Lemmon Survey	·	2.1 km	MPC · JPL
429667	2011 GN_{64}	—	January 31, 2006	Kitt Peak	Spacewatch	·	1.8 km	MPC · JPL
429668	2011 GB_{67}	—	November 10, 2009	Kitt Peak	Spacewatch	·	1.7 km	MPC · JPL
429669	2011 GK_{67}	—	April 22, 2007	Catalina	CSS	·	3.1 km	MPC · JPL
429670	2011 GA_{68}	—	December 20, 2009	Mount Lemmon	Mount Lemmon Survey	BRA	1.8 km	MPC · JPL
429671	2011 GN_{75}	—	March 27, 2011	Kitt Peak	Spacewatch	·	1.6 km	MPC · JPL
429672	2011 GN_{81}	—	February 7, 2006	Mount Lemmon	Mount Lemmon Survey	·	1.6 km	MPC · JPL
429673	2011 GK_{84}	—	October 28, 2008	Mount Lemmon	Mount Lemmon Survey	BRA	1.3 km	MPC · JPL
429674	2011 GX_{87}	—	February 20, 2006	Kitt Peak	Spacewatch	EUN	1.2 km	MPC · JPL
429675	2011 HO_{1}	—	December 25, 2005	Kitt Peak	Spacewatch	·	1.9 km	MPC · JPL
429676	2011 HZ_{2}	—	August 22, 2004	Kitt Peak	Spacewatch	·	1.4 km	MPC · JPL
429677	2011 HB_{5}	—	March 15, 2011	Mount Lemmon	Mount Lemmon Survey	·	1.8 km	MPC · JPL
429678	2011 HA_{6}	—	October 22, 2008	Mount Lemmon	Mount Lemmon Survey	·	1.4 km	MPC · JPL
429679	2011 HE_{6}	—	March 14, 2007	Siding Spring	SSS	·	1.7 km	MPC · JPL
429680	2011 HQ_{6}	—	October 1, 2008	Mount Lemmon	Mount Lemmon Survey	·	1.6 km	MPC · JPL
429681	2011 HZ_{6}	—	May 24, 2006	Kitt Peak	Spacewatch	·	1.9 km	MPC · JPL
429682	2011 HV_{9}	—	October 6, 2008	Mount Lemmon	Mount Lemmon Survey	·	1.7 km	MPC · JPL
429683	2011 HC_{10}	—	September 22, 2008	Socorro	LINEAR	·	2.0 km	MPC · JPL
429684	2011 HY_{10}	—	May 10, 2007	Mount Lemmon	Mount Lemmon Survey	·	1.3 km	MPC · JPL
429685	2011 HA_{25}	—	September 23, 2008	Kitt Peak	Spacewatch	·	1.8 km	MPC · JPL
429686	2011 HJ_{25}	—	December 1, 2008	Kitt Peak	Spacewatch	·	3.4 km	MPC · JPL
429687	2011 HU_{29}	—	April 10, 2002	Socorro	LINEAR	·	1.6 km	MPC · JPL
429688	2011 HL_{33}	—	March 8, 2005	Mount Lemmon	Mount Lemmon Survey	EOS	2.3 km	MPC · JPL
429689	2011 HT_{38}	—	April 20, 2007	Mount Lemmon	Mount Lemmon Survey	·	1.3 km	MPC · JPL
429690	2011 HG_{43}	—	December 4, 2005	Kitt Peak	Spacewatch	·	1.1 km	MPC · JPL
429691	2011 HK_{43}	—	January 4, 2006	Kitt Peak	Spacewatch	·	1.4 km	MPC · JPL
429692	2011 HT_{43}	—	May 24, 2006	Kitt Peak	Spacewatch	BRA	1.5 km	MPC · JPL
429693	2011 HN_{51}	—	January 8, 2010	Kitt Peak	Spacewatch	·	3.1 km	MPC · JPL
429694	2011 HW_{51}	—	November 21, 2009	Mount Lemmon	Mount Lemmon Survey	EOS	2.1 km	MPC · JPL
429695	2011 HZ_{51}	—	June 27, 1998	Kitt Peak	Spacewatch	·	1.8 km	MPC · JPL
429696	2011 HB_{55}	—	November 18, 2009	Mount Lemmon	Mount Lemmon Survey	·	1.8 km	MPC · JPL
429697	2011 HC_{57}	—	December 18, 2009	Kitt Peak	Spacewatch	·	1.7 km	MPC · JPL
429698	2011 HK_{58}	—	March 13, 2010	WISE	WISE	·	2.0 km	MPC · JPL
429699	2011 HX_{62}	—	March 14, 2010	WISE	WISE	·	3.4 km	MPC · JPL
429700	2011 HL_{63}	—	February 25, 2006	Mount Lemmon	Mount Lemmon Survey	·	1.6 km	MPC · JPL

== 429701–429800 ==
back to top

Designation			Discovery			Properties		Ref
Permanent	Provisional	Named after	Date	Site	Discoverer(s)	Category	Diam.	Ref
429701	2011 HO_{74}	—	January 26, 2006	Catalina	CSS	·	1.8 km	MPC · JPL
429702	2011 HM_{75}	—	April 1, 2011	Mount Lemmon	Mount Lemmon Survey	·	1.5 km	MPC · JPL
429703	2011 HD_{76}	—	June 12, 2007	Kitt Peak	Spacewatch	·	1.2 km	MPC · JPL
429704	2011 HL_{77}	—	April 5, 2011	Kitt Peak	Spacewatch	·	2.2 km	MPC · JPL
429705	2011 HL_{79}	—	April 27, 2011	Kitt Peak	Spacewatch	VER	3.1 km	MPC · JPL
429706	2011 HU_{81}	—	September 24, 2008	Mount Lemmon	Mount Lemmon Survey	·	1.7 km	MPC · JPL
429707	2011 HO_{89}	—	March 28, 2011	Kitt Peak	Spacewatch	·	1.4 km	MPC · JPL
429708	2011 HA_{95}	—	April 10, 2010	WISE	WISE	·	2.6 km	MPC · JPL
429709	2011 HN_{98}	—	March 14, 2011	Kitt Peak	Spacewatch	·	1.4 km	MPC · JPL
429710	2011 HC_{100}	—	December 18, 2009	Mount Lemmon	Mount Lemmon Survey	·	2.1 km	MPC · JPL
429711	2011 HB_{101}	—	March 28, 2010	WISE	WISE	·	3.8 km	MPC · JPL
429712	2011 JF_{1}	—	November 30, 2005	Mount Lemmon	Mount Lemmon Survey	·	2.0 km	MPC · JPL
429713	2011 JB_{2}	—	April 17, 2007	Catalina	CSS	·	1.2 km	MPC · JPL
429714	2011 JS_{5}	—	April 25, 2007	Mount Lemmon	Mount Lemmon Survey	·	1.2 km	MPC · JPL
429715	2011 JD_{7}	—	November 12, 2005	Kitt Peak	Spacewatch	·	1.1 km	MPC · JPL
429716	2011 JH_{12}	—	April 13, 2011	Catalina	CSS	·	1.9 km	MPC · JPL
429717	2011 JZ_{26}	—	November 6, 2008	Catalina	CSS	·	2.5 km	MPC · JPL
429718	2011 JT_{27}	—	May 8, 2011	Mount Lemmon	Mount Lemmon Survey	·	3.0 km	MPC · JPL
429719	2011 JB_{29}	—	October 11, 2007	Kitt Peak	Spacewatch	·	2.3 km	MPC · JPL
429720	2011 JG_{29}	—	June 8, 2007	Kitt Peak	Spacewatch	·	1.3 km	MPC · JPL
429721	2011 KW	—	November 20, 2008	Kitt Peak	Spacewatch	·	2.2 km	MPC · JPL
429722	2011 KA_{2}	—	April 30, 2011	Mount Lemmon	Mount Lemmon Survey	·	1.7 km	MPC · JPL
429723	2011 KS_{5}	—	November 19, 2008	Kitt Peak	Spacewatch	EOS	2.3 km	MPC · JPL
429724	2011 KA_{14}	—	February 28, 2010	WISE	WISE	·	3.3 km	MPC · JPL
429725	2011 KW_{22}	—	February 9, 2010	Kitt Peak	Spacewatch	·	3.0 km	MPC · JPL
429726	2011 KH_{24}	—	May 21, 2011	Mount Lemmon	Mount Lemmon Survey	·	1.6 km	MPC · JPL
429727	2011 KC_{26}	—	December 25, 2005	Kitt Peak	Spacewatch	·	1.3 km	MPC · JPL
429728	2011 KD_{28}	—	November 17, 2009	Mount Lemmon	Mount Lemmon Survey	·	1.9 km	MPC · JPL
429729	2011 KF_{29}	—	June 10, 2007	Siding Spring	SSS	·	1.6 km	MPC · JPL
429730	2011 KQ_{43}	—	February 24, 2006	Kitt Peak	Spacewatch	·	1.6 km	MPC · JPL
429731	2011 KP_{47}	—	December 19, 2009	Mount Lemmon	Mount Lemmon Survey	·	1.6 km	MPC · JPL
429732	2011 LZ_{8}	—	January 30, 2009	Mount Lemmon	Mount Lemmon Survey	T_{j} (2.98)	3.5 km	MPC · JPL
429733 Gilbertbaker	2011 LX_{10}	Gilbertbaker	June 6, 2011	Catalina	CSS	AMO +1km	1.7 km	MPC · JPL
429734	2011 LM_{11}	—	December 17, 2009	Mount Lemmon	Mount Lemmon Survey	GEF	1.5 km	MPC · JPL
429735	2011 MA	—	June 19, 2011	Siding Spring	SSS	·	2.1 km	MPC · JPL
429736	2011 MB_{2}	—	June 24, 2011	Siding Spring	SSS	APO	320 m	MPC · JPL
429737	2011 NC_{1}	—	February 28, 2009	Mount Lemmon	Mount Lemmon Survey	·	3.3 km	MPC · JPL
429738	2011 OD_{3}	—	February 25, 2004	Socorro	LINEAR	·	5.3 km	MPC · JPL
429739	2011 OA_{6}	—	June 13, 2011	Mount Lemmon	Mount Lemmon Survey	CYB	3.4 km	MPC · JPL
429740	2011 OD_{25}	—	February 3, 2009	Mount Lemmon	Mount Lemmon Survey	·	3.3 km	MPC · JPL
429741	2011 OT_{59}	—	February 17, 2004	Kitt Peak	Spacewatch	·	3.4 km	MPC · JPL
429742	2011 QG_{28}	—	January 25, 2009	Kitt Peak	Spacewatch	·	3.8 km	MPC · JPL
429743	2011 QP_{52}	—	April 6, 2005	Mount Lemmon	Mount Lemmon Survey	·	4.1 km	MPC · JPL
429744	2011 QN_{53}	—	January 22, 2010	WISE	WISE	·	3.9 km	MPC · JPL
429745	2011 QC_{66}	—	July 21, 2010	WISE	WISE	LIX	5.3 km	MPC · JPL
429746	2011 SA_{16}	—	September 18, 2011	Haleakala	Pan-STARRS 1	AMO +1km	1.3 km	MPC · JPL
429747	2011 SM_{61}	—	February 16, 2010	WISE	WISE	·	4.2 km	MPC · JPL
429748	2011 SD_{97}	—	August 26, 1998	Kitt Peak	Spacewatch	H	530 m	MPC · JPL
429749	2011 SC_{113}	—	March 9, 2005	Socorro	LINEAR	H	540 m	MPC · JPL
429750	2011 SC_{202}	—	August 29, 2000	Socorro	LINEAR	·	2.0 km	MPC · JPL
429751	2011 SS_{249}	—	December 25, 2009	Kitt Peak	Spacewatch	H	880 m	MPC · JPL
429752	2011 UO_{10}	—	October 1, 2000	Socorro	LINEAR	·	3.9 km	MPC · JPL
429753	2011 UZ_{20}	—	April 11, 2010	Kitt Peak	Spacewatch	H	610 m	MPC · JPL
429754	2011 UB_{29}	—	June 16, 2005	Kitt Peak	Spacewatch	H	560 m	MPC · JPL
429755	2011 UM_{106}	—	October 23, 2011	Kitt Peak	Spacewatch	H	540 m	MPC · JPL
429756	2011 UW_{159}	—	April 10, 2010	Kitt Peak	Spacewatch	H	560 m	MPC · JPL
429757	2011 UV_{271}	—	March 20, 2010	Kitt Peak	Spacewatch	H	540 m	MPC · JPL
429758	2011 WO_{65}	—	October 12, 2010	Mount Lemmon	Mount Lemmon Survey	L4	9.4 km	MPC · JPL
429759	2011 WR_{72}	—	September 21, 2008	Mount Lemmon	Mount Lemmon Survey	L4	10 km	MPC · JPL
429760	2011 WV_{129}	—	May 28, 2000	Socorro	LINEAR	H	510 m	MPC · JPL
429761	2012 BP_{134}	—	August 27, 2005	Anderson Mesa	LONEOS	H	580 m	MPC · JPL
429762	2012 DN_{13}	—	February 21, 2012	Kitt Peak	Spacewatch	·	660 m	MPC · JPL
429763	2012 DN_{15}	—	February 20, 2012	Kitt Peak	Spacewatch	·	830 m	MPC · JPL
429764	2012 DZ_{43}	—	September 6, 2002	Socorro	LINEAR	H	490 m	MPC · JPL
429765	2012 DF_{45}	—	October 14, 2010	Mount Lemmon	Mount Lemmon Survey	·	700 m	MPC · JPL
429766	2012 DY_{45}	—	February 26, 2012	Kitt Peak	Spacewatch	·	680 m	MPC · JPL
429767	2012 DA_{56}	—	January 7, 2002	Kitt Peak	Spacewatch	·	530 m	MPC · JPL
429768	2012 DX_{73}	—	September 5, 2010	Mount Lemmon	Mount Lemmon Survey	·	630 m	MPC · JPL
429769	2012 DJ_{76}	—	September 3, 2010	Mount Lemmon	Mount Lemmon Survey	·	650 m	MPC · JPL
429770	2012 DP_{79}	—	February 21, 2001	Socorro	LINEAR	H	750 m	MPC · JPL
429771	2012 EF_{1}	—	November 14, 2007	Kitt Peak	Spacewatch	·	690 m	MPC · JPL
429772	2012 EO_{12}	—	October 16, 2007	Mount Lemmon	Mount Lemmon Survey	·	560 m	MPC · JPL
429773	2012 FU_{4}	—	September 4, 2010	Mount Lemmon	Mount Lemmon Survey	·	480 m	MPC · JPL
429774	2012 FT_{29}	—	April 2, 2009	Kitt Peak	Spacewatch	·	690 m	MPC · JPL
429775	2012 FT_{52}	—	February 2, 2005	Kitt Peak	Spacewatch	(2076)	750 m	MPC · JPL
429776	2012 GK_{1}	—	February 8, 2008	Kitt Peak	Spacewatch	·	1.3 km	MPC · JPL
429777	2012 GS_{21}	—	September 20, 2006	Catalina	CSS	·	900 m	MPC · JPL
429778	2012 GK_{22}	—	December 14, 2010	Mount Lemmon	Mount Lemmon Survey	·	860 m	MPC · JPL
429779	2012 GZ_{26}	—	September 27, 2000	Kitt Peak	Spacewatch	·	780 m	MPC · JPL
429780	2012 GB_{37}	—	September 19, 2006	Kitt Peak	Spacewatch	·	950 m	MPC · JPL
429781	2012 GX_{37}	—	May 6, 2005	Catalina	CSS	·	840 m	MPC · JPL
429782	2012 GY_{39}	—	April 26, 2001	Anderson Mesa	LONEOS	·	1.6 km	MPC · JPL
429783	2012 HZ_{6}	—	March 28, 2012	Kitt Peak	Spacewatch	·	610 m	MPC · JPL
429784	2012 HJ_{7}	—	April 18, 2012	Kitt Peak	Spacewatch	·	720 m	MPC · JPL
429785	2012 HA_{18}	—	January 10, 2008	Mount Lemmon	Mount Lemmon Survey	·	770 m	MPC · JPL
429786	2012 HO_{21}	—	June 17, 2009	Kitt Peak	Spacewatch	·	730 m	MPC · JPL
429787	2012 HP_{23}	—	October 19, 2006	Kitt Peak	Spacewatch	·	600 m	MPC · JPL
429788	2012 HN_{27}	—	March 10, 2005	Mount Lemmon	Mount Lemmon Survey	·	580 m	MPC · JPL
429789	2012 HR_{27}	—	March 14, 2012	Mount Lemmon	Mount Lemmon Survey	·	680 m	MPC · JPL
429790	2012 HT_{27}	—	April 11, 2005	Kitt Peak	Spacewatch	·	630 m	MPC · JPL
429791	2012 HB_{29}	—	November 6, 2010	Mount Lemmon	Mount Lemmon Survey	·	620 m	MPC · JPL
429792	2012 HJ_{37}	—	February 23, 2012	Mount Lemmon	Mount Lemmon Survey	·	640 m	MPC · JPL
429793	2012 HU_{37}	—	April 21, 2002	Kitt Peak	Spacewatch	PHO	820 m	MPC · JPL
429794	2012 HH_{39}	—	December 17, 2007	Mount Lemmon	Mount Lemmon Survey	·	830 m	MPC · JPL
429795	2012 HE_{55}	—	March 10, 2005	Anderson Mesa	LONEOS	·	660 m	MPC · JPL
429796	2012 HW_{55}	—	February 9, 2005	Kitt Peak	Spacewatch	·	670 m	MPC · JPL
429797	2012 HQ_{58}	—	September 25, 2006	Kitt Peak	Spacewatch	·	610 m	MPC · JPL
429798	2012 HN_{67}	—	December 5, 2007	Kitt Peak	Spacewatch	·	690 m	MPC · JPL
429799	2012 HJ_{82}	—	May 1, 2003	Kitt Peak	Spacewatch	·	4.7 km	MPC · JPL
429800	2012 HT_{83}	—	March 6, 2008	Mount Lemmon	Mount Lemmon Survey	·	960 m	MPC · JPL

== 429801–429900 ==
back to top

Designation			Discovery			Properties		Ref
Permanent	Provisional	Named after	Date	Site	Discoverer(s)	Category	Diam.	Ref
429801	2012 JW_{1}	—	January 26, 2011	Mount Lemmon	Mount Lemmon Survey	·	1.4 km	MPC · JPL
429802	2012 JL_{2}	—	February 28, 2008	Kitt Peak	Spacewatch	·	1.4 km	MPC · JPL
429803	2012 JX_{8}	—	October 19, 2003	Kitt Peak	Spacewatch	·	760 m	MPC · JPL
429804	2012 JM_{12}	—	October 2, 2005	Mount Lemmon	Mount Lemmon Survey	·	1.7 km	MPC · JPL
429805	2012 JY_{15}	—	October 19, 2006	Kitt Peak	Deep Ecliptic Survey	MAS	680 m	MPC · JPL
429806	2012 JB_{17}	—	December 31, 2007	Kitt Peak	Spacewatch	·	670 m	MPC · JPL
429807	2012 JT_{20}	—	November 14, 2010	Mount Lemmon	Mount Lemmon Survey	·	740 m	MPC · JPL
429808	2012 JD_{24}	—	March 6, 2008	Mount Lemmon	Mount Lemmon Survey	PHO	2.7 km	MPC · JPL
429809	2012 JW_{24}	—	December 8, 1996	Kitt Peak	Spacewatch	·	790 m	MPC · JPL
429810	2012 JY_{25}	—	February 9, 2008	Kitt Peak	Spacewatch	·	830 m	MPC · JPL
429811	2012 JM_{50}	—	May 8, 2005	Mount Lemmon	Mount Lemmon Survey	·	810 m	MPC · JPL
429812	2012 JP_{50}	—	December 4, 2007	Mount Lemmon	Mount Lemmon Survey	·	600 m	MPC · JPL
429813	2012 JW_{58}	—	March 29, 2012	Kitt Peak	Spacewatch	·	800 m	MPC · JPL
429814	2012 KB_{3}	—	November 27, 2010	Mount Lemmon	Mount Lemmon Survey	·	1.1 km	MPC · JPL
429815	2012 KM_{15}	—	May 5, 2008	Mount Lemmon	Mount Lemmon Survey	·	1.2 km	MPC · JPL
429816	2012 KR_{32}	—	February 28, 2008	Kitt Peak	Spacewatch	·	1.1 km	MPC · JPL
429817	2012 KG_{38}	—	May 28, 2008	Mount Lemmon	Mount Lemmon Survey	(5)	1.1 km	MPC · JPL
429818	2012 KN_{43}	—	July 3, 2005	Mount Lemmon	Mount Lemmon Survey	·	850 m	MPC · JPL
429819	2012 KR_{46}	—	May 21, 2012	Mount Lemmon	Mount Lemmon Survey	·	850 m	MPC · JPL
429820	2012 KC_{48}	—	October 22, 2003	Kitt Peak	Spacewatch	·	680 m	MPC · JPL
429821	2012 KO_{48}	—	February 18, 2008	Mount Lemmon	Mount Lemmon Survey	·	950 m	MPC · JPL
429822	2012 KK_{51}	—	January 13, 2011	Kitt Peak	Spacewatch	·	1.2 km	MPC · JPL
429823	2012 LX_{21}	—	November 24, 1997	Kitt Peak	Spacewatch	·	1.9 km	MPC · JPL
429824	2012 MC_{8}	—	May 30, 2012	Mount Lemmon	Mount Lemmon Survey	·	1.8 km	MPC · JPL
429825	2012 NW_{1}	—	December 18, 2009	Kitt Peak	Spacewatch	·	2.1 km	MPC · JPL
429826	2012 PS	—	December 5, 2008	Mount Lemmon	Mount Lemmon Survey	·	4.1 km	MPC · JPL
429827	2012 PS_{3}	—	September 19, 2003	Kitt Peak	Spacewatch	·	2.4 km	MPC · JPL
429828	2012 PC_{4}	—	September 10, 2007	Kitt Peak	Spacewatch	·	2.7 km	MPC · JPL
429829	2012 PU_{4}	—	September 5, 2008	Kitt Peak	Spacewatch	·	1.5 km	MPC · JPL
429830	2012 PK_{12}	—	December 18, 2003	Kitt Peak	Spacewatch	EOS	2.2 km	MPC · JPL
429831	2012 PB_{15}	—	May 30, 2006	Mount Lemmon	Mount Lemmon Survey	·	2.7 km	MPC · JPL
429832	2012 PF_{22}	—	January 26, 2006	Mount Lemmon	Mount Lemmon Survey	·	1.8 km	MPC · JPL
429833	2012 PM_{30}	—	January 30, 2011	Mount Lemmon	Mount Lemmon Survey	·	1.7 km	MPC · JPL
429834	2012 PW_{33}	—	November 20, 2008	Kitt Peak	Spacewatch	EOS	2.2 km	MPC · JPL
429835	2012 PX_{36}	—	December 20, 2009	Mount Lemmon	Mount Lemmon Survey	·	2.2 km	MPC · JPL
429836	2012 QB_{7}	—	December 22, 2008	Mount Lemmon	Mount Lemmon Survey	·	2.5 km	MPC · JPL
429837	2012 QR_{9}	—	January 9, 2011	Mount Lemmon	Mount Lemmon Survey	·	1.8 km	MPC · JPL
429838	2012 QU_{18}	—	October 9, 2007	Mount Lemmon	Mount Lemmon Survey	·	2.3 km	MPC · JPL
429839	2012 QC_{25}	—	February 25, 2011	Kitt Peak	Spacewatch	·	1.9 km	MPC · JPL
429840	2012 QD_{27}	—	August 24, 2001	Kitt Peak	Spacewatch	·	2.4 km	MPC · JPL
429841	2012 QN_{34}	—	February 15, 2010	Mount Lemmon	Mount Lemmon Survey	·	1.8 km	MPC · JPL
429842	2012 QP_{34}	—	August 25, 2012	Kitt Peak	Spacewatch	·	3.7 km	MPC · JPL
429843	2012 QB_{35}	—	March 13, 2010	Kitt Peak	Spacewatch	·	3.3 km	MPC · JPL
429844	2012 QL_{39}	—	September 29, 1994	Kitt Peak	Spacewatch	·	2.0 km	MPC · JPL
429845	2012 QX_{40}	—	April 25, 2004	Socorro	LINEAR	·	1.5 km	MPC · JPL
429846	2012 QK_{41}	—	March 24, 2006	Catalina	CSS	BRA	2.0 km	MPC · JPL
429847	2012 QK_{44}	—	October 30, 2005	Kitt Peak	Spacewatch	V	680 m	MPC · JPL
429848	2012 QA_{46}	—	October 25, 2008	Kitt Peak	Spacewatch	·	3.4 km	MPC · JPL
429849	2012 QC_{51}	—	June 10, 2010	WISE	WISE	·	3.3 km	MPC · JPL
429850	2012 RA_{4}	—	October 28, 2008	Kitt Peak	Spacewatch	·	1.9 km	MPC · JPL
429851	2012 RP_{5}	—	September 5, 2007	Mount Lemmon	Mount Lemmon Survey	(16286)	2.1 km	MPC · JPL
429852	2012 RW_{7}	—	January 23, 2006	Kitt Peak	Spacewatch	EUN	1.5 km	MPC · JPL
429853	2012 RH_{9}	—	August 28, 2006	Kitt Peak	Spacewatch	·	3.2 km	MPC · JPL
429854	2012 RD_{15}	—	September 22, 2003	Kitt Peak	Spacewatch	HOF	2.6 km	MPC · JPL
429855	2012 RF_{18}	—	September 13, 1996	Kitt Peak	Spacewatch	·	2.3 km	MPC · JPL
429856	2012 RH_{18}	—	December 2, 2008	Kitt Peak	Spacewatch	·	2.1 km	MPC · JPL
429857	2012 RG_{20}	—	September 24, 2008	Kitt Peak	Spacewatch	·	2.0 km	MPC · JPL
429858	2012 RC_{28}	—	February 28, 2009	Mount Lemmon	Mount Lemmon Survey	·	3.1 km	MPC · JPL
429859	2012 RA_{31}	—	February 1, 2009	Kitt Peak	Spacewatch	·	3.2 km	MPC · JPL
429860	2012 RN_{31}	—	June 15, 2004	Siding Spring	SSS	PHO	1.1 km	MPC · JPL
429861	2012 RG_{38}	—	November 2, 2007	Mount Lemmon	Mount Lemmon Survey	·	4.1 km	MPC · JPL
429862	2012 SO_{6}	—	January 13, 2005	Socorro	LINEAR	L5	10 km	MPC · JPL
429863	2012 SQ_{9}	—	November 9, 2007	Mount Lemmon	Mount Lemmon Survey	·	2.9 km	MPC · JPL
429864	2012 SQ_{10}	—	September 19, 2012	Mount Lemmon	Mount Lemmon Survey	L4	9.6 km	MPC · JPL
429865	2012 SX_{11}	—	August 10, 2007	Kitt Peak	Spacewatch	KOR	1.2 km	MPC · JPL
429866	2012 SH_{14}	—	September 17, 2012	Kitt Peak	Spacewatch	·	2.2 km	MPC · JPL
429867	2012 SV_{15}	—	September 15, 2006	Kitt Peak	Spacewatch	ELF	3.9 km	MPC · JPL
429868	2012 SO_{18}	—	November 8, 2007	Socorro	LINEAR	EOS	2.4 km	MPC · JPL
429869	2012 ST_{19}	—	May 9, 2010	Mount Lemmon	Mount Lemmon Survey	·	3.5 km	MPC · JPL
429870	2012 SC_{21}	—	February 14, 2004	Kitt Peak	Spacewatch	EOS	2.6 km	MPC · JPL
429871	2012 SX_{24}	—	October 14, 2001	Socorro	LINEAR	VER	3.7 km	MPC · JPL
429872	2012 SC_{30}	—	March 15, 2010	Kitt Peak	Spacewatch	·	2.2 km	MPC · JPL
429873	2012 SZ_{31}	—	April 7, 2005	Kitt Peak	Spacewatch	·	2.8 km	MPC · JPL
429874	2012 SS_{39}	—	February 18, 2010	Mount Lemmon	Mount Lemmon Survey	·	2.7 km	MPC · JPL
429875	2012 SY_{40}	—	September 21, 2008	Kitt Peak	Spacewatch	·	1.2 km	MPC · JPL
429876	2012 SO_{42}	—	September 15, 2007	Mount Lemmon	Mount Lemmon Survey	·	2.4 km	MPC · JPL
429877	2012 SL_{46}	—	March 1, 2011	Mount Lemmon	Mount Lemmon Survey	EUN	990 m	MPC · JPL
429878	2012 SO_{51}	—	January 28, 2000	Kitt Peak	Spacewatch	·	2.1 km	MPC · JPL
429879	2012 SR_{51}	—	September 13, 2007	Kitt Peak	Spacewatch	·	2.6 km	MPC · JPL
429880	2012 SM_{62}	—	February 3, 2009	Kitt Peak	Spacewatch	·	2.8 km	MPC · JPL
429881	2012 TL_{3}	—	September 16, 2012	Mount Lemmon	Mount Lemmon Survey	·	2.7 km	MPC · JPL
429882	2012 TM_{7}	—	May 14, 2005	Mount Lemmon	Mount Lemmon Survey	EOS	1.8 km	MPC · JPL
429883	2012 TD_{14}	—	March 3, 2009	Kitt Peak	Spacewatch	CYB	3.7 km	MPC · JPL
429884	2012 TE_{16}	—	September 26, 2003	Socorro	LINEAR	·	2.0 km	MPC · JPL
429885	2012 TT_{16}	—	September 15, 2007	Mount Lemmon	Mount Lemmon Survey	EOS	1.8 km	MPC · JPL
429886	2012 TG_{21}	—	October 12, 2004	Kitt Peak	Spacewatch	3:2 · SHU	4.7 km	MPC · JPL
429887	2012 TS_{25}	—	October 14, 2007	Kitt Peak	Spacewatch	·	1.9 km	MPC · JPL
429888	2012 TY_{35}	—	September 20, 2008	Kitt Peak	Spacewatch	MAR	1.1 km	MPC · JPL
429889	2012 TH_{38}	—	January 25, 2009	Kitt Peak	Spacewatch	·	2.6 km	MPC · JPL
429890	2012 TQ_{42}	—	November 4, 2007	Mount Lemmon	Mount Lemmon Survey	EOS	2.1 km	MPC · JPL
429891	2012 TY_{49}	—	October 15, 2001	Kitt Peak	Spacewatch	·	3.0 km	MPC · JPL
429892	2012 TU_{69}	—	September 9, 2007	Kitt Peak	Spacewatch	BRA	1.3 km	MPC · JPL
429893	2012 TB_{70}	—	April 11, 2005	Mount Lemmon	Mount Lemmon Survey	HYG	2.9 km	MPC · JPL
429894	2012 TO_{72}	—	May 6, 2006	Mount Lemmon	Mount Lemmon Survey	·	2.8 km	MPC · JPL
429895	2012 TB_{79}	—	March 12, 2011	Siding Spring	SSS	·	2.5 km	MPC · JPL
429896	2012 TU_{87}	—	April 11, 2010	Mount Lemmon	Mount Lemmon Survey	·	2.5 km	MPC · JPL
429897	2012 TS_{90}	—	November 2, 2007	Kitt Peak	Spacewatch	·	3.0 km	MPC · JPL
429898	2012 TR_{91}	—	December 5, 2008	Kitt Peak	Spacewatch	KOR	1.8 km	MPC · JPL
429899	2012 TV_{91}	—	September 3, 2007	Catalina	CSS	·	2.4 km	MPC · JPL
429900	2012 TG_{94}	—	April 22, 2007	Catalina	CSS	JUN	1.0 km	MPC · JPL

== 429901–430000 ==
back to top

Designation			Discovery			Properties		Ref
Permanent	Provisional	Named after	Date	Site	Discoverer(s)	Category	Diam.	Ref
429901	2012 TO_{96}	—	October 20, 2006	Kitt Peak	Spacewatch	·	3.1 km	MPC · JPL
429902	2012 TZ_{96}	—	March 14, 2011	Mount Lemmon	Mount Lemmon Survey	·	1.5 km	MPC · JPL
429903	2012 TF_{101}	—	September 19, 2006	Catalina	CSS	·	5.6 km	MPC · JPL
429904	2012 TG_{103}	—	April 10, 2010	Mount Lemmon	Mount Lemmon Survey	·	2.9 km	MPC · JPL
429905	2012 TA_{108}	—	April 5, 1994	Kitt Peak	Spacewatch	·	1.5 km	MPC · JPL
429906	2012 TV_{126}	—	March 16, 2010	Mount Lemmon	Mount Lemmon Survey	·	3.0 km	MPC · JPL
429907	2012 TU_{134}	—	October 19, 1995	Kitt Peak	Spacewatch	·	1.6 km	MPC · JPL
429908	2012 TN_{138}	—	October 21, 2007	Mount Lemmon	Mount Lemmon Survey	·	3.1 km	MPC · JPL
429909	2012 TK_{139}	—	November 7, 2007	Kitt Peak	Spacewatch	·	3.6 km	MPC · JPL
429910	2012 TK_{141}	—	February 1, 2009	Mount Lemmon	Mount Lemmon Survey	·	2.5 km	MPC · JPL
429911	2012 TG_{148}	—	August 19, 2006	Kitt Peak	Spacewatch	·	2.3 km	MPC · JPL
429912	2012 TM_{152}	—	April 5, 2005	Mount Lemmon	Mount Lemmon Survey	THM	2.3 km	MPC · JPL
429913	2012 TR_{152}	—	September 14, 2007	Mount Lemmon	Mount Lemmon Survey	·	1.7 km	MPC · JPL
429914	2012 TN_{167}	—	November 9, 2007	Kitt Peak	Spacewatch	·	3.0 km	MPC · JPL
429915	2012 TU_{169}	—	April 15, 2007	Kitt Peak	Spacewatch	·	1.6 km	MPC · JPL
429916	2012 TB_{171}	—	April 17, 2005	Kitt Peak	Spacewatch	·	2.7 km	MPC · JPL
429917	2012 TF_{174}	—	September 9, 2004	Kitt Peak	Spacewatch	·	1.1 km	MPC · JPL
429918	2012 TY_{179}	—	November 4, 2007	Mount Lemmon	Mount Lemmon Survey	EOS	1.9 km	MPC · JPL
429919	2012 TR_{185}	—	January 18, 2009	XuYi	PMO NEO Survey Program	EOS	2.1 km	MPC · JPL
429920	2012 TQ_{200}	—	November 1, 2005	Mount Lemmon	Mount Lemmon Survey	3:2	4.0 km	MPC · JPL
429921	2012 TT_{210}	—	September 15, 2012	Catalina	CSS	·	2.7 km	MPC · JPL
429922	2012 TN_{218}	—	September 15, 2006	Kitt Peak	Spacewatch	·	3.2 km	MPC · JPL
429923	2012 TQ_{221}	—	November 14, 2007	Kitt Peak	Spacewatch	·	2.5 km	MPC · JPL
429924	2012 TR_{223}	—	November 4, 2007	Kitt Peak	Spacewatch	·	2.6 km	MPC · JPL
429925	2012 TD_{228}	—	September 28, 2006	Kitt Peak	Spacewatch	VER	3.0 km	MPC · JPL
429926	2012 TF_{234}	—	September 12, 2007	Mount Lemmon	Mount Lemmon Survey	·	1.9 km	MPC · JPL
429927	2012 TW_{238}	—	March 18, 2004	Kitt Peak	Spacewatch	·	3.2 km	MPC · JPL
429928	2012 TP_{240}	—	May 13, 2005	Kitt Peak	Spacewatch	EOS	2.0 km	MPC · JPL
429929	2012 TD_{253}	—	February 2, 2009	Kitt Peak	Spacewatch	HYG	2.5 km	MPC · JPL
429930	2012 TX_{265}	—	August 28, 2006	Kitt Peak	Spacewatch	·	2.5 km	MPC · JPL
429931	2012 TF_{274}	—	March 17, 2004	Kitt Peak	Spacewatch	·	3.5 km	MPC · JPL
429932	2012 TS_{275}	—	November 18, 2001	Kitt Peak	Spacewatch	·	4.1 km	MPC · JPL
429933	2012 TS_{284}	—	December 29, 2008	Mount Lemmon	Mount Lemmon Survey	·	3.0 km	MPC · JPL
429934	2012 TC_{286}	—	October 7, 2004	Kitt Peak	Spacewatch	3:2	5.0 km	MPC · JPL
429935	2012 TD_{287}	—	January 1, 2009	Mount Lemmon	Mount Lemmon Survey	·	2.9 km	MPC · JPL
429936	2012 TW_{287}	—	October 20, 2006	Mount Lemmon	Mount Lemmon Survey	CYB	4.2 km	MPC · JPL
429937	2012 TG_{302}	—	September 16, 2006	Anderson Mesa	LONEOS	·	3.2 km	MPC · JPL
429938	2012 TU_{307}	—	January 20, 2009	Mount Lemmon	Mount Lemmon Survey	VER	4.8 km	MPC · JPL
429939	2012 TG_{309}	—	August 27, 2006	Kitt Peak	Spacewatch	·	3.8 km	MPC · JPL
429940	2012 TU_{312}	—	September 19, 1995	Kitt Peak	Spacewatch	·	3.3 km	MPC · JPL
429941	2012 TC_{313}	—	June 7, 2008	Catalina	CSS	·	3.2 km	MPC · JPL
429942	2012 TF_{313}	—	October 6, 2007	Kitt Peak	Spacewatch	·	2.5 km	MPC · JPL
429943	2012 TZ_{314}	—	October 2, 1991	Kitt Peak	Spacewatch	·	1.7 km	MPC · JPL
429944	2012 UZ_{4}	—	February 14, 2010	Kitt Peak	Spacewatch	·	2.7 km	MPC · JPL
429945	2012 UP_{8}	—	April 7, 2005	Kitt Peak	Spacewatch	EOS	1.7 km	MPC · JPL
429946	2012 UA_{11}	—	November 2, 2008	Kitt Peak	Spacewatch	·	1.5 km	MPC · JPL
429947	2012 UH_{24}	—	August 18, 2006	Kitt Peak	Spacewatch	EOS	2.2 km	MPC · JPL
429948	2012 UK_{37}	—	February 22, 2009	Kitt Peak	Spacewatch	·	3.5 km	MPC · JPL
429949	2012 UO_{46}	—	February 14, 2010	Mount Lemmon	Mount Lemmon Survey	·	1.6 km	MPC · JPL
429950	2012 UA_{99}	—	April 10, 2010	Mount Lemmon	Mount Lemmon Survey	·	2.9 km	MPC · JPL
429951	2012 UU_{112}	—	November 11, 2006	Kitt Peak	Spacewatch	CYB	4.4 km	MPC · JPL
429952	2012 UZ_{113}	—	September 15, 2006	Kitt Peak	Spacewatch	·	3.8 km	MPC · JPL
429953	2012 UR_{139}	—	September 14, 2006	Catalina	CSS	·	3.4 km	MPC · JPL
429954	2012 UL_{140}	—	October 10, 2012	Mount Lemmon	Mount Lemmon Survey	·	2.1 km	MPC · JPL
429955	2012 UM_{157}	—	September 20, 2001	Socorro	LINEAR	·	2.7 km	MPC · JPL
429956	2012 US_{168}	—	November 1, 2007	Kitt Peak	Spacewatch	·	3.5 km	MPC · JPL
429957	2012 UG_{172}	—	October 8, 2012	Mount Lemmon	Mount Lemmon Survey	3:2	4.4 km	MPC · JPL
429958	2012 UQ_{176}	—	November 20, 2007	Kitt Peak	Spacewatch	·	3.8 km	MPC · JPL
429959	2012 VB_{14}	—	September 16, 2003	Kitt Peak	Spacewatch	·	1.6 km	MPC · JPL
429960	2012 VD_{29}	—	February 11, 2010	WISE	WISE	·	3.8 km	MPC · JPL
429961	2012 VS_{50}	—	September 19, 2006	Kitt Peak	Spacewatch	VER	2.7 km	MPC · JPL
429962	2012 VV_{61}	—	May 7, 2010	Mount Lemmon	Mount Lemmon Survey	·	3.4 km	MPC · JPL
429963	2012 VR_{64}	—	November 5, 2007	Kitt Peak	Spacewatch	·	2.8 km	MPC · JPL
429964	2012 VX_{64}	—	October 11, 2007	Kitt Peak	Spacewatch	EOS	1.8 km	MPC · JPL
429965	2012 VG_{65}	—	April 10, 2010	Kitt Peak	Spacewatch	·	2.7 km	MPC · JPL
429966	2012 VK_{81}	—	November 12, 2012	Mount Lemmon	Mount Lemmon Survey	3:2	5.1 km	MPC · JPL
429967	2012 XC_{51}	—	October 20, 2001	Socorro	LINEAR	·	1.2 km	MPC · JPL
429968	2012 XF_{114}	—	February 2, 2009	Mount Lemmon	Mount Lemmon Survey	EOS	2.4 km	MPC · JPL
429969	2013 AU_{32}	—	September 9, 2008	Mount Lemmon	Mount Lemmon Survey	L4	9.8 km	MPC · JPL
429970	2013 AQ_{54}	—	December 27, 2000	Kitt Peak	Spacewatch	L4	9.1 km	MPC · JPL
429971	2013 AH_{60}	—	September 27, 2006	Catalina	CSS	T_{j} (2.95)	5.0 km	MPC · JPL
429972	2013 AR_{131}	—	July 25, 2010	WISE	WISE	·	5.3 km	MPC · JPL
429973	2013 AH_{144}	—	September 18, 2009	Kitt Peak	Spacewatch	L4	8.4 km	MPC · JPL
429974	2013 BM_{26}	—	February 20, 2002	Kitt Peak	Spacewatch	L4 · ERY	8.0 km	MPC · JPL
429975	2013 CP_{210}	—	January 10, 2013	Kitt Peak	Spacewatch	L4	10 km	MPC · JPL
429976	2013 JG_{1}	—	November 20, 2006	Kitt Peak	Spacewatch	H	540 m	MPC · JPL
429977	2013 LN_{7}	—	January 11, 2010	Kitt Peak	Spacewatch	H	540 m	MPC · JPL
429978	2013 LC_{11}	—	November 3, 2007	Mount Lemmon	Mount Lemmon Survey	·	880 m	MPC · JPL
429979	2013 LH_{30}	—	March 16, 2007	Catalina	CSS	H	650 m	MPC · JPL
429980	2013 MM_{4}	—	December 4, 2010	Mount Lemmon	Mount Lemmon Survey	·	680 m	MPC · JPL
429981	2013 NE	—	December 26, 2006	Kitt Peak	Spacewatch	H	480 m	MPC · JPL
429982	2013 NV_{11}	—	December 9, 2006	Kitt Peak	Spacewatch	·	1.6 km	MPC · JPL
429983	2013 OA_{5}	—	December 7, 1999	Kitt Peak	Spacewatch	MAS	690 m	MPC · JPL
429984	2013 PF_{3}	—	September 23, 2000	Socorro	LINEAR	H	790 m	MPC · JPL
429985	2013 PS_{7}	—	February 21, 2012	Kitt Peak	Spacewatch	·	610 m	MPC · JPL
429986	2013 PE_{28}	—	January 2, 2011	Mount Lemmon	Mount Lemmon Survey	EUN	1.3 km	MPC · JPL
429987	2013 PC_{36}	—	September 29, 2009	Mount Lemmon	Mount Lemmon Survey	·	1.5 km	MPC · JPL
429988	2013 PZ_{36}	—	October 1, 2003	Anderson Mesa	LONEOS	·	770 m	MPC · JPL
429989	2013 PK_{37}	—	November 3, 2005	Mount Lemmon	Mount Lemmon Survey	·	1.1 km	MPC · JPL
429990	2013 PL_{37}	—	November 2, 2006	Mount Lemmon	Mount Lemmon Survey	·	1.6 km	MPC · JPL
429991	2013 PR_{37}	—	October 31, 2010	Kitt Peak	Spacewatch	·	660 m	MPC · JPL
429992	2013 PU_{38}	—	June 18, 2005	Mount Lemmon	Mount Lemmon Survey	·	1.7 km	MPC · JPL
429993	2013 PN_{56}	—	December 4, 2005	Mount Lemmon	Mount Lemmon Survey	MIS	1.8 km	MPC · JPL
429994	2013 PG_{68}	—	November 9, 2009	Catalina	CSS	·	2.2 km	MPC · JPL
429995	2013 QQ_{3}	—	September 26, 2006	Mount Lemmon	Mount Lemmon Survey	·	790 m	MPC · JPL
429996	2013 QC_{13}	—	November 26, 2009	Mount Lemmon	Mount Lemmon Survey	·	1.2 km	MPC · JPL
429997	2013 QH_{18}	—	February 14, 2010	Mount Lemmon	Mount Lemmon Survey	·	3.0 km	MPC · JPL
429998	2013 QM_{26}	—	December 13, 2010	Mount Lemmon	Mount Lemmon Survey	·	2.1 km	MPC · JPL
429999	2013 QJ_{30}	—	August 17, 2009	Catalina	CSS	EUN	1.3 km	MPC · JPL
430000	2013 QT_{44}	—	October 27, 2009	Mount Lemmon	Mount Lemmon Survey	·	1.5 km	MPC · JPL

back to top

== Meaning of names ==
As minor planet discoveries are confirmed, they are given a permanent number by the IAU's Minor Planet Center (MPC), and the discoverers can then submit names for them, following the IAU's naming conventions. The list below concerns those minor planets in the specified number-range that have received names, and explains the meanings of those names.

Official naming citations of newly named small Solar System bodies are approved and published in a bulletin by IAU's Working Group for Small Bodies Nomenclature (WGSBN). Before May 2021, citations were published in MPC's Minor Planet Circulars for many decades. Recent citations can also be found on the JPL Small-Body Database (SBDB). Until his death in 2016, German astronomer Lutz D. Schmadel compiled these citations into the Dictionary of Minor Planet Names (DMP) and regularly updated the collection.

Based on Paul Herget's The Names of the Minor Planets, Schmadel also researched the unclear origin of numerous asteroids, most of which had been named prior to World War II. This article incorporates text from this source, which is in the public domain: SBDB New namings may only be added to this list below after official publication as the preannouncement of names is condemned. The WGSBN publishes a comprehensive guideline for the naming rules of non-cometary small Solar System bodies.

Named minor planet	Provisional	This minor planet was named for...	Ref · Catalog
429031 Hannavonhoerner	2009 CJ_{4}	Hanna von Hoerner (1942–2014) was a German astrophysicist and space entrepreneur. After studying physics at Heidelberg University she founded a company involved in the development of space instrumentation, primarily for solar system missions, such as Rosetta's COSIMA mass spectrometer	JPL · 429031
429032 Sebvonhoerner	2009 CN_{4}	Sebastian von Hoerner (1919–2003) was a German astrophysicist and radio astronomer. After graduation and habilitation at Heidelberg he moved to the Green Bank radio observatory, contributing to the optimisation of radio telescope designs. He became one of the pioneers of the search for extraterrestrial intelligence	JPL · 429032
429033 Günterwendt	2009 CF_{5}	Günter Wendt (1924–2010) was a German aeronautical engineer. After World War II he moved to the US and joined the crewed spaceflight program. He was pad leader during the Mercury, Gemini, Apollo and Skylab missions and was the person who closed the spacecraft hatch and bade farewell to launching astronauts	JPL · 429033
429084 Dietrichrex	2009 RN_{27}	Dietrich Rex (1934–2016), a German physicist, university professor and head of the Spaceflight and Reactor Technology Institute of the Brunswick University of Technology.	JPL · 429084
429120 Mikhaillavrov	2009 SW_{267}	Mikhail Ivanovich Lavrov (1927–2002) was an astrophysicist and a professor at Kazan University. He was a brilliant teacher of practical astrophysics, researcher on eclipsing binary stars, and one of the pioneers of computer analysis and modeling of light curves in the 1970s.	JPL · 429120
429136 Corsali	2009 TJ_{8}	Andrea Corsali (1487–?) was an Italian explorer who traveled to Asia and the south seas aboard a Portuguese merchant vessel. He identified, located, illustrated and named the constellation now known as the Southern Cross.	IAU · 429136
429733 Gilbertbaker	2011 LX_{10}	Gilbert Baker (1951–2017), American artist, civil rights advocate, and flag designer.	IAU · 429733
