= Hanna von Hoerner =

German astrophysicist and physicist (1942–2014)

- Born: 14 November 1942; Görlitz, Germany
- Died: 4 July 2014 (aged 71); Oftersheim, Germany
- Education: PhD
- Alma mater: University Heidelberg University
- Awards: 2013 Order of Merit of the Federal Republic of Germany 2009 Order of Merit of Baden-Württemberg

Hanna von Hoerner (14 November 1942 – 4 July 2014) was a German astrophysicist. She founded the company von Hoerner & Sulger which produces scientific instruments, notably cosmic dust analyzers used on space missions by the European Space Agency (ESA) and NASA.

== Early life ==
Hanna von Hoerner was born in Görlitz in 1942. Her father was the astrophysicist Sebastian von Hoerner. With his help and encouragement, she repaired radios when she was six and built an oscilloscope at the age of fourteen.

In the early 1960s, after she had graduated from her secondary school, her father moved to the National Radio Astronomy Observatory (NRAO) in the US. Von Hoerner completed an electronics education in the United States and worked as a research assistant at the National Radio Astronomy Observatory.

== Education ==
In 1965, von Hoerner returned to West Germany to study experimental physics at Heidelberg University. In 1971 she earned an undergraduate degree and in 1974 her PhD, both at Heidelberg University.

== Career ==
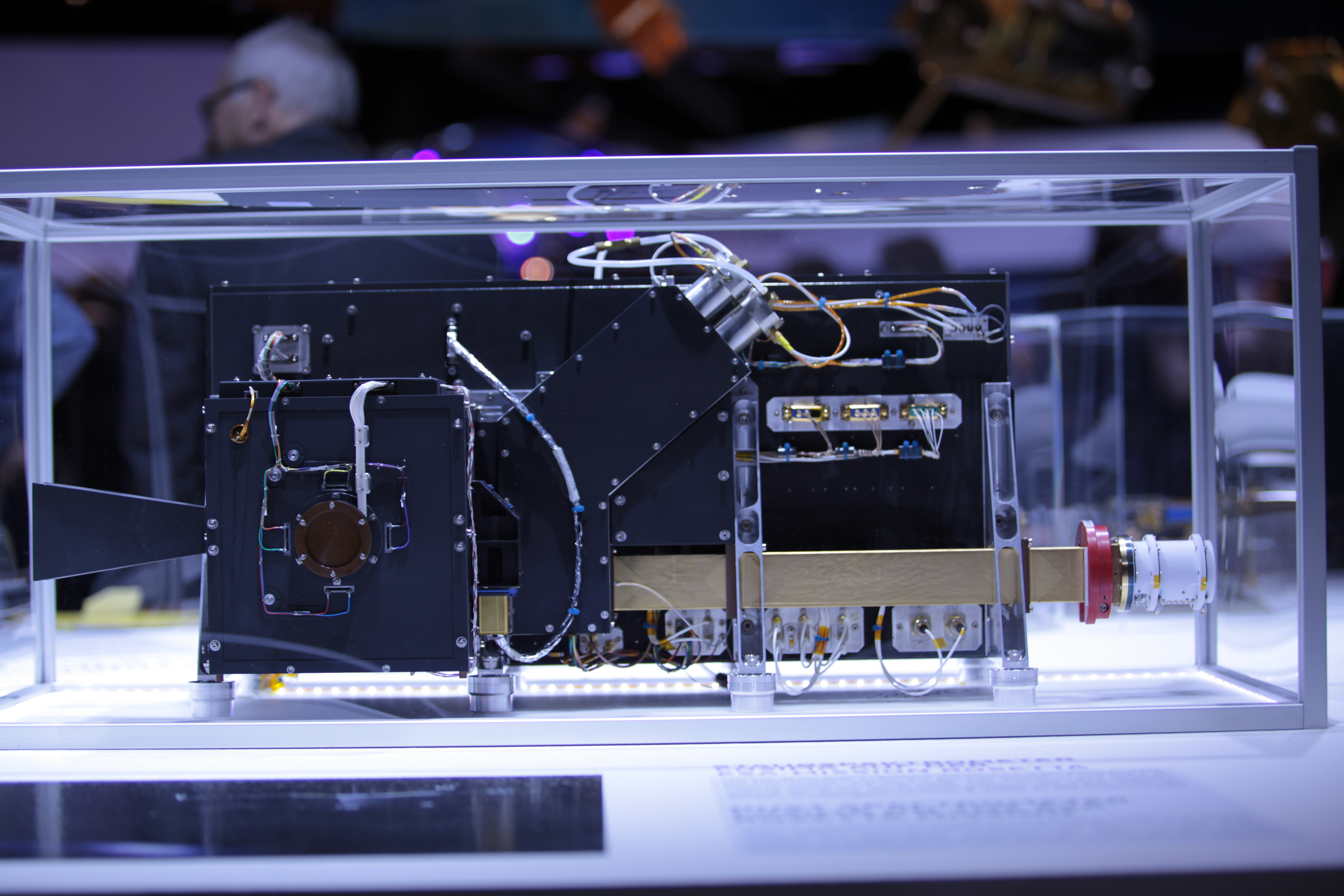
COSIMA Staubspektrometer – COSIMA dust spectrometer (14237329074)

Von Hoerner, in 1973 while still working on her PhD, founded the company von Hoerner & Sulger. Based in Schwetzingen and produces scientific instruments for use in space and medicine. In 1980 von Hoerner & Sulger developed the first mass spectrometer that worked in space In 1979 van Hoerner's company was commissioned by the Max Planck Institute for Solar System Research to design a cosmic dust detector for use in the Vega program missions to Venus. In 1999 Von Hoerner & Sulger designed CIDA (Cometary and Interstellar Dust Analyzer), a dust analysis instrument on board the NASA spacecraft Stardust, which launched in 1999. The company is famous for the design of COSIMA (Cometary Secondary Ion Mass Analyser), an instrument on board the Rosetta spacecraft that analyses the composition of dust particles using secondary ion mass spectrometry. Early data included images of dust particles collected in the environment of Comet 67P/C-G from the nucleus approach phase until along with secondary ion mass spectra for some of those particles.

=== Reflections on Hanna von Hoerner ===
The interstellar dust collector is one of the prime examples of space measuring instruments with which the Baden-based small company von Hoerner & Sulger (vH & S) has made a name for itself. With just 20 employees and a turnover of 7.7 million euros last year, according to managing director Hanna von Hoerner,

— Veronika Szentpetery, in Technology Review 1997

== Awards and recognition ==
- 2009 Von Hoerner was awarded the Order of Merit of Baden-Württemberg
- 2013 Order of Merit of the Federal Republic of Germany First Class for her contributions to space science in Germany.
- 2016 A comet was named after her.
- Member of the Space Forum in the BDLI (Bundesverband der Deutschen Luft- und Raumfahrtindustrie / German Aerospace Industries Association)
- Board of Trustees of the Max Planck Institute for Solar System Research
- DLR Space Program Committee

== Publications ==
- COSIMA: High Resolution Time-of-Flight Secondary Mass Spectrometer for the Analysis of Cometary Dust Particles Onboard ROSETTA.
- COSIMA Cometary Dust Analysis in the inner coma of Comet 67P/Churyumov-Gerasimenko authors: Hilchenbach, Martin; Kissel, Jochen; Briois, Christelle; von Hoerner, Hanna; November 2014 AAS Division for Planetary Sciences Meeting Abstracts
- Search for satellites near comet 67P/Churyumov-Gerasimenko using Rosetta/OSIRIS images Astronomy & Astrophysics. vol.583: A19.
