= Sebastian von Hoerner =

German astrophysicist and radio astronomer

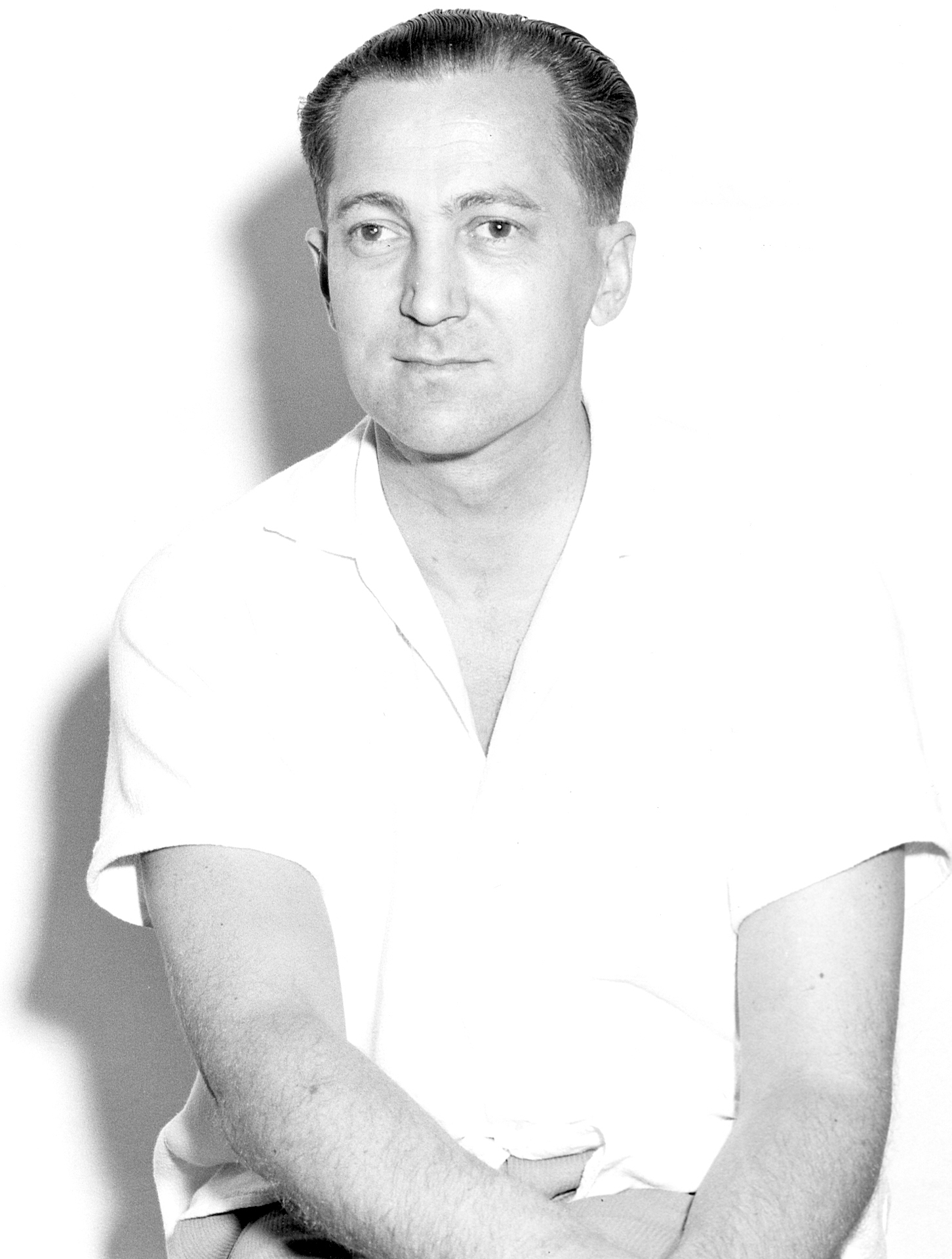
- Born: Sebastian Rudolf Karl von Hoerner; April 15, 1919; Görlitz, Lower Silesia, Germany
- Died: January 7, 2003 (aged 83); Esslingen am Neckar, Baden-Württemberg, Germany
- Education: University of Göttingen, University of Heidelberg
- Scientific career
- Fields: Radio astronomy

Sebastian Rudolf Karl von Hoerner (15 April 1919 – 7 January 2003) was a German astrophysicist and radio astronomer.

He was born in Görlitz, Lower Silesia. During World War II, von Hoerner served in the German Army on the Eastern Front. A bullet struck a pair of binoculars he was wearing on a strap around his neck, ricocheted up and blinded him in one eye. He was sent to Germany to recover and was there when the Front collapsed. After the end of World War II he studied physics at University of Göttingen. He obtained his doctorate at the same university in 1951 as Carl Friedrich von Weizsäcker. Together they conducted simulations that studied the formation of stars and globular clusters. He continued this work at Astronomical Calculation Institute (University of Heidelberg) with Walter Fricke. He obtained his habilitation in 1959 at the University of Heidelberg. In 1962 he moved to National Radio Astronomy Observatory (Green Bank, West Virginia), where he collaborated, inter alia, with Frank Drake. He worked there, among others on the analysis of work and technical optimization of radio telescopes. His research led to the development of a new method for the construction of radio telescopes, homology, later used in the construction of many of them. During this time, he was actively involved in discussions on SETI, the number of advanced civilizations in the galaxy, and the possibility of interstellar travel. He was skeptical on these issues.

In 1961, he published an article in which he was not optimistic about the survival time of species using machines. At the outset, he noted that the current state of mind (primacy of science, developing technology, searching for interstellar communication) is just one of many possibilities and in the future it can be replaced by other interests. Moreover, according to him, the progress of science and technology on Earth was driven by two factors – the struggle for domination and the desire for an easy life. The former leads to complete destruction, the latter to biological or psychical degeneration. Von Hoerner assumed that any civilization must disappear after some time and listed four possible causes of such a catastrophe:

1. total destruction of life on the planet
2. destroying only intelligent beings
3. mental or physical degeneration
4. loss of scientific and research interests (related to cause 3.)

He estimated the average duration of civilization at 6,500 years. He suggested the succession of technological species on a given planet over a time distance of hundreds of millions of years, and each habitable planet (one in 3 million stars) during its existence "produces" an average of 4 technological species. With these assumptions, the average distance between civilizations in the Milky Way is 1,000 light-years. Von Hoerner's calculations also show that the probability of establishing first contact with a civilization in the same phase of development as the earthly one is 0.5%. The most likely such contact is with a civilization that will be 12,000 years old and with a 75% probability that it will not be the first civilization on this planet.

Hoerner died in Esslingen am Neckar, Baden-Württemberg, at age 83. His daughter, Hanna von Hoerner, was also an astrophysicist.

== Publications ==
- von Hoerner S., 1960, Z. Astrophys. 50, 184
- von Hoerner S., 1963, Z. Astrophys. 57, 47
