= Thomas P. Stafford Airport =

- IATA: none; ICAO: KOJA; FAA LID: OJA

Summary
- Airport type: Public
- Owner: City of Weatherford
- Serves: Weatherford, Oklahoma
- Elevation AMSL: 1,605 ft / 489 m
- Coordinates: 35°32′45″N 098°40′07″W
- Website: https://cityofweatherford.com/transportation

Map
- Location of airport in Oklahoma OJA (the United States)

Runways
| Direction | Length | | Surface |
| Direction | ft | m | Surface |
|---|---|---|---|
| 17/35 | 5,100 | 1,554 | Concrete |

Statistics (2018)
- Aircraft operations (year ending 6/13/2018): 8,000
- Based aircraft: 30
- Source: Federal Aviation Administration

Thomas P. Stafford Airport (ICAO: KOJA, FAA LID: OJA, formerly F91) is a city-owned, public-use airport located two nautical miles (4 km) northeast of the central business district of Weatherford, a city in Custer County, Oklahoma. Named after NASA astronaut and Weatherford native Thomas P. Stafford, it is included in the National Plan of Integrated Airport Systems for 2011–2015, which categorized it as a general aviation facility.

Although many U.S. airports use the same three-letter location identifier for the FAA and IATA, this airport is assigned OJA by the FAA but has no designation from the IATA.

The Stafford Air & Space Museum, which is also named for Thomas P. Stafford, is located at the airport, and exhibits the Gemini 6A space capsule flown by Stafford and Wally Schirra in 1965 and the spacesuit Stafford wore during his 1969 Apollo 10 Moon mission.

== Facilities and aircraft ==
Thomas P. Stafford Airport covers an area of 167 acres (68 ha) at an elevation of 1,605 feet (489 m) above mean sea level. It has one runway designated 17/35 with a concrete surface measuring 5,100 by 75 feet (1,554 x 23 m). The runway previously had an asphalt surface measuring 4,400 by 75 feet (1,341 x 23 m).

For the 12-month period ending June 13, 2018, the airport had 8,000 aircraft operations, 98% general aviation, and 2% military, an average of 22 per day. At that time there were 30 aircraft based at this airport: 19 single-engine, 6 multi-engine, 4 jet, and 1 helicopter.

== See also ==
- List of airports in Oklahoma
