= Weatherford High School =

Weatherford High School may refer to:

- Weatherford High School (Oklahoma), Weatherford, Oklahoma
- Weatherford High School (Texas), Weatherford, Texas
