= Gemini 7 =

1965 NASA crewed spaceflight

Gemini VII
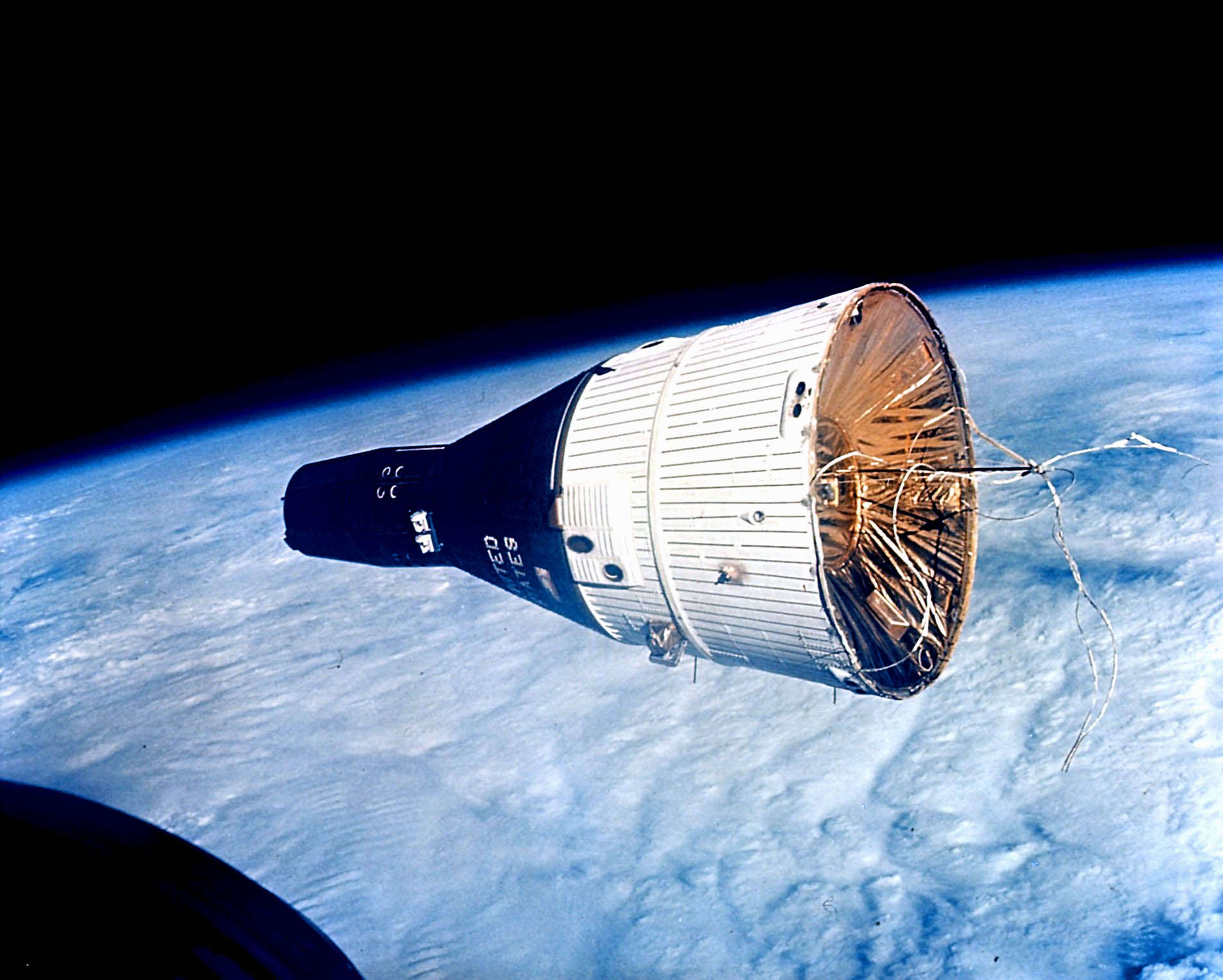
- Gemini 7 as seen by Gemini 6A
- Mission type: Endurance test
- Operator: NASA
- COSPAR ID: 1965-100A
- SATCAT no.: 01812
- Mission duration: 13 days, 18 hours, 35 minutes, 1 second
- Distance travelled: 9,030,000 km (4,876,000 nmi)
- Orbits completed: 206

Spacecraft properties
- Spacecraft: Gemini SC7
- Manufacturer: McDonnell
- Launch mass: 3,663 kg (8,076 lb)
- Landing mass: 1,958.22 kg (4,317.14 lb)

Crew
- Crew size: 2
- Members: Frank Borman; Jim Lovell

Start of mission
- Launch date: December 4, 1965, 19:30:03 UTC
- Rocket: Titan II GLV, s/n 62-12562
- Launch site: Cape Kennedy, LC-19

End of mission
- Recovered by: USS Wasp
- Landing date: December 18, 1965, 14:05:04 UTC
- Landing site: Atlantic Ocean southwest of Bermuda (25.42°N 70.10°W)

Orbital parameters
- Reference system: Geocentric orbit
- Regime: Low Earth orbit
- Perigee altitude: 299.7 km (161.8 nmi; 186.2 mi)
- Apogee altitude: 303.7 km (164.0 nmi; 188.7 mi)
- Inclination: 28.87°
- Period: 90.54 minutes
- Epoch: December 9, 1965
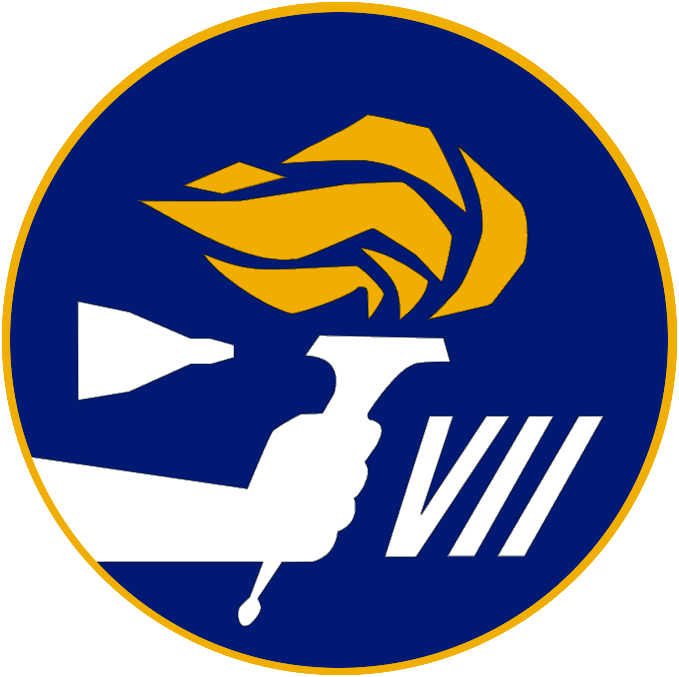
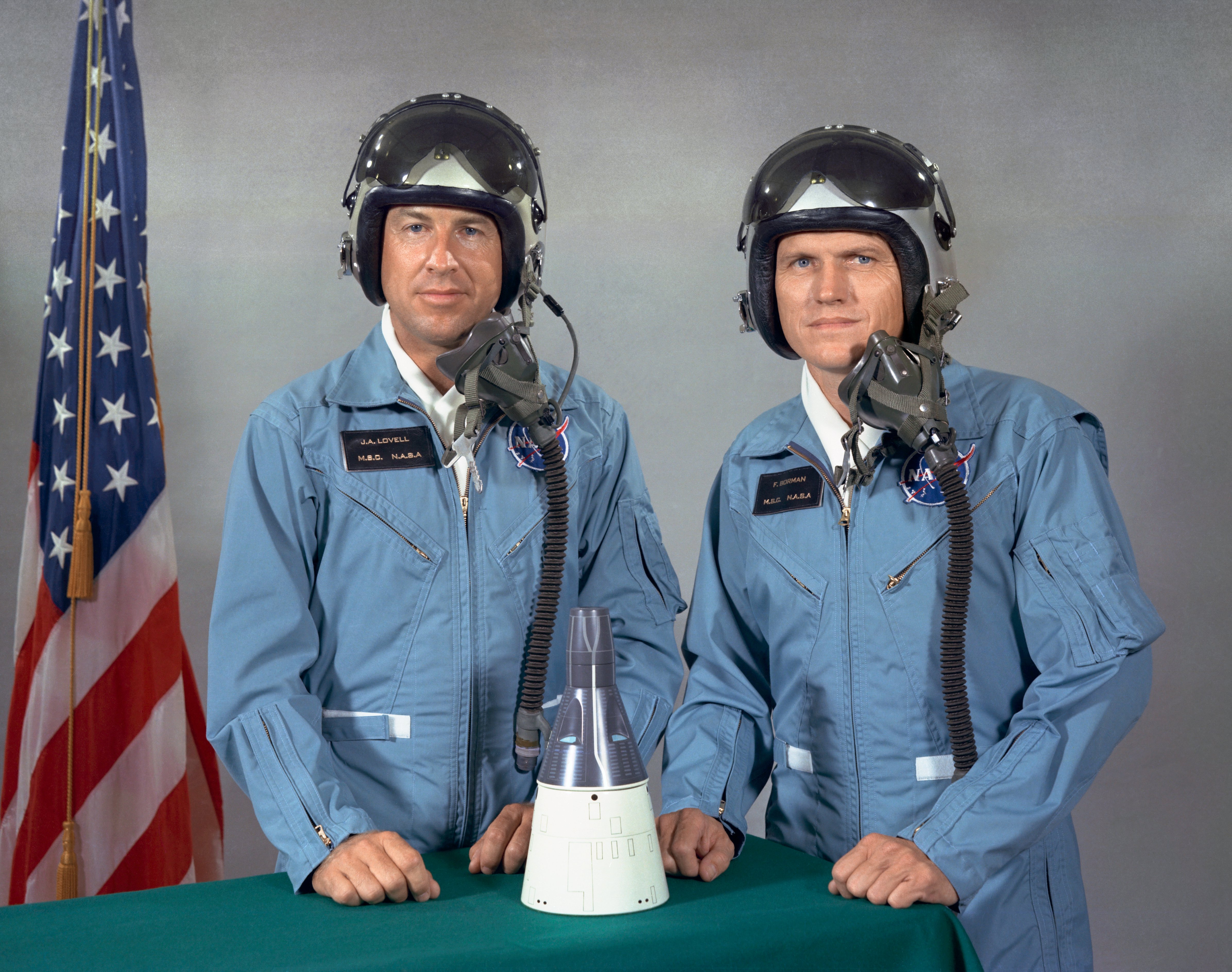
- (L-R) Lovell, Borman Project Gemini

Gemini 7 (officially Gemini VII) was a 1965 human spaceflight in NASA's Gemini program. It was the fourth crewed Gemini flight, the twelfth crewed American spaceflight, and the twentieth crewed spaceflight including Soviet flights and X-15 flights above the Kármán line. The crew of Frank Borman and Jim Lovell spent nearly 14 days in space, making a total of 206 orbits. Their spacecraft was the passive target for the first crewed space rendezvous performed by the crew of Gemini 6A.

== Crew ==
| Position | Astronaut |
|---|---|
| Command Pilot | Frank F. Borman II; First spaceflight |
| Pilot | James A. Lovell Jr. First spaceflight |

=== Backup crew ===
| Position | Astronaut |
|---|---|
| Command Pilot | Edward H. White II |
| Pilot | Michael Collins |

=== Support crew ===
- Charles Bassett (Houston CAPCOM)
- Alan Bean (Cape CAPCOM)
- Eugene Cernan (Houston CAPCOM)
- Elliot See (Houston CAPCOM)

== Mission parameters ==
- Launch mass: 3,663 kilograms (8,076 lb)
- Landing mass: 1,958 kilograms (4,317 lb)

At December 9 epoch, five days after launch:

- Perigee: 299 km (161 nmi; 186 mi)
- Apogee: 302 km (163 nmi; 188 mi)
- Inclination: 28.9°
- Period: 90.54 minutes

=== Stationkeeping with GT-6A ===
- Start: December 15, 1965, 19:33 UTC
- End: December 16, 1965, 00:52 UTC
- Duration: 5 hours, 19 minutes

== Objectives ==
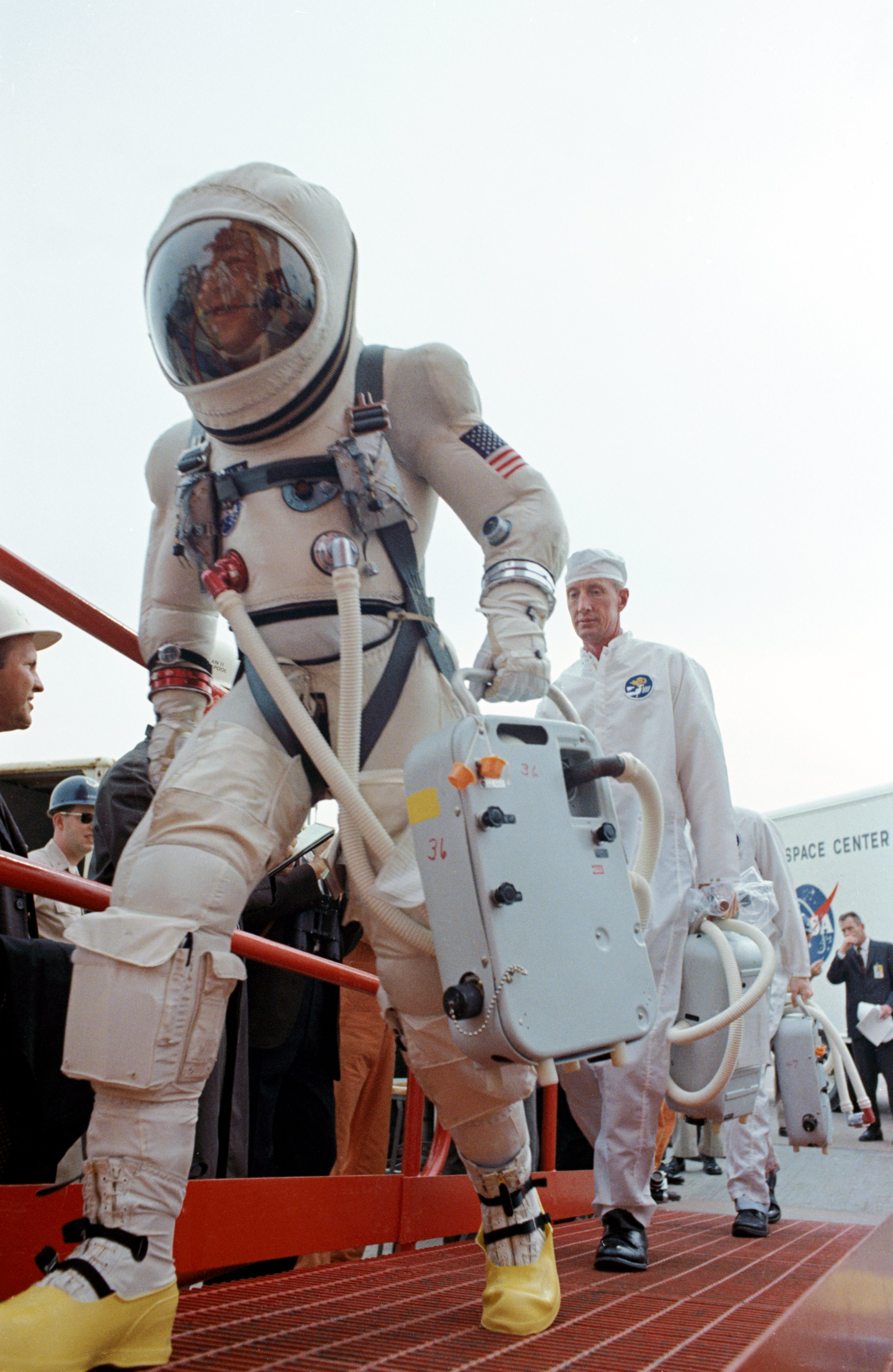
Lovell before the launch, in the special G5C spacesuit, which had a zippered hood with a visor instead of a solid helmet.

Gemini 7 was originally intended to fly after Gemini 6, but the original Gemini 6 mission was cancelled after the failure during launch of the Agena Target Vehicle with which it was meant to rendezvous and dock. The objective of rendezvous was so important, that it was decided to fly the alternate Gemini 6A mission concurrently with Gemini 7, using the latter as the rendezvous target.

This 14-day mission required NASA to solve some of the problems of long-duration space flight, such as stowage of waste (the crew had practiced stuffing waste paper behind their seats before the flight). Timing their workday to match that of the prime shift ground crews, both men worked and slept at the same time. Gemini 7 conducted twenty experiments, the most of any Gemini mission, including studies of nutrition in space. The astronauts also evaluated a lightweight spacesuit, the G5C, which proved uncomfortable when worn for a long time in the Gemini spacecraft's hot, cramped quarters. The high point of the mission came on the eleventh day with the rendezvous with Gemini 6A.

Both astronauts, heeding the advice of Pete Conrad who had flown for eight days on Gemini 5, took books along to read. Gemini 7 held the record for the longest space flight until Soyuz 9 in June 1970, and was the longest crewed space flight in U.S. history until the Skylab 2 mission of May and June 1973.

== Flight ==
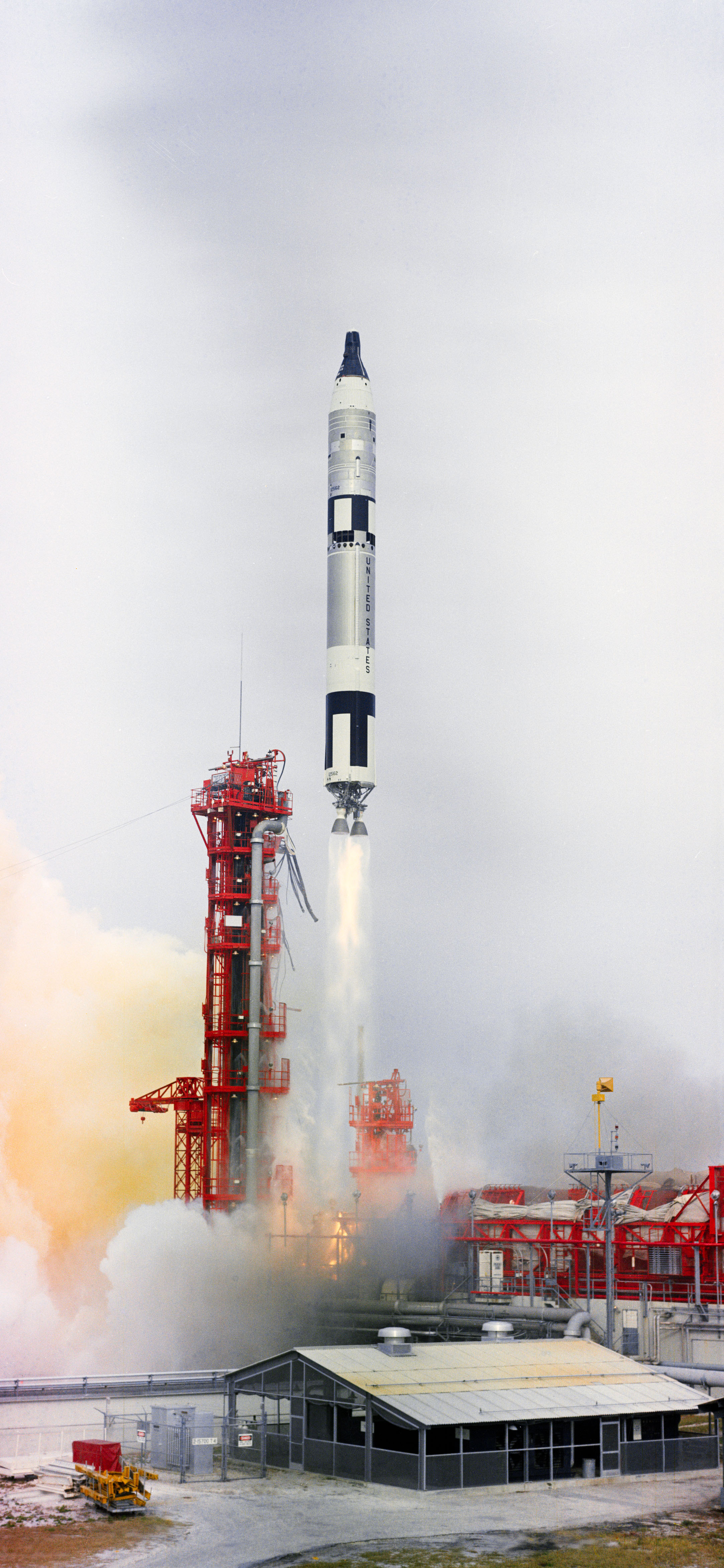
Gemini 7 heads into space

Launch went without any problems and all systems on the Titan II performed nominally. Some slight pogo vibrations were detected starting at T+110 seconds into launch, but unlike with Gemini 5 where the astronauts experienced momentary vision and speech problems, Borman reported only feeling a very light shaking sensation and Lovell nothing. After separating from the spent rocket stage, they turned the spacecraft around and proceeded to station keep with the rocket stage, a maneuver first tried on Gemini 4. The Gemini 4 attempt was unsuccessful, due to the limited knowledge at the time of the complex orbital mechanics involved. Gemini 7 flew in formation with its upper stage for fifteen minutes, at which time Borman stopped because he felt too much fuel was being consumed, and the stage was moving erratically as it vented its own remaining fuel.

They spent the rest of their first day in space doing some experiments and eating their first meal. Their sleep periods were scheduled at the same time unlike previous missions and they were able to get some sleep. The next morning they were awoken at 9:06 am EST and given the morning's news, which included the collision of two airliners over New York. For the first time during a flight, one of the crew was allowed to take off his suit. Borman and Lovell had planned to both take them off two days into the mission, when they were satisfied that the environmental system was working properly. The NASA managers did not like this idea, and said that at least one crew member had to be wearing a suit at all times. Borman wore his suit and sweated profusely, but agreed to let Lovell stay out of his suit, as Lovell was the larger of the two, and it required a lot of effort to get in and out of a suit in little more space than the front seat of a car.

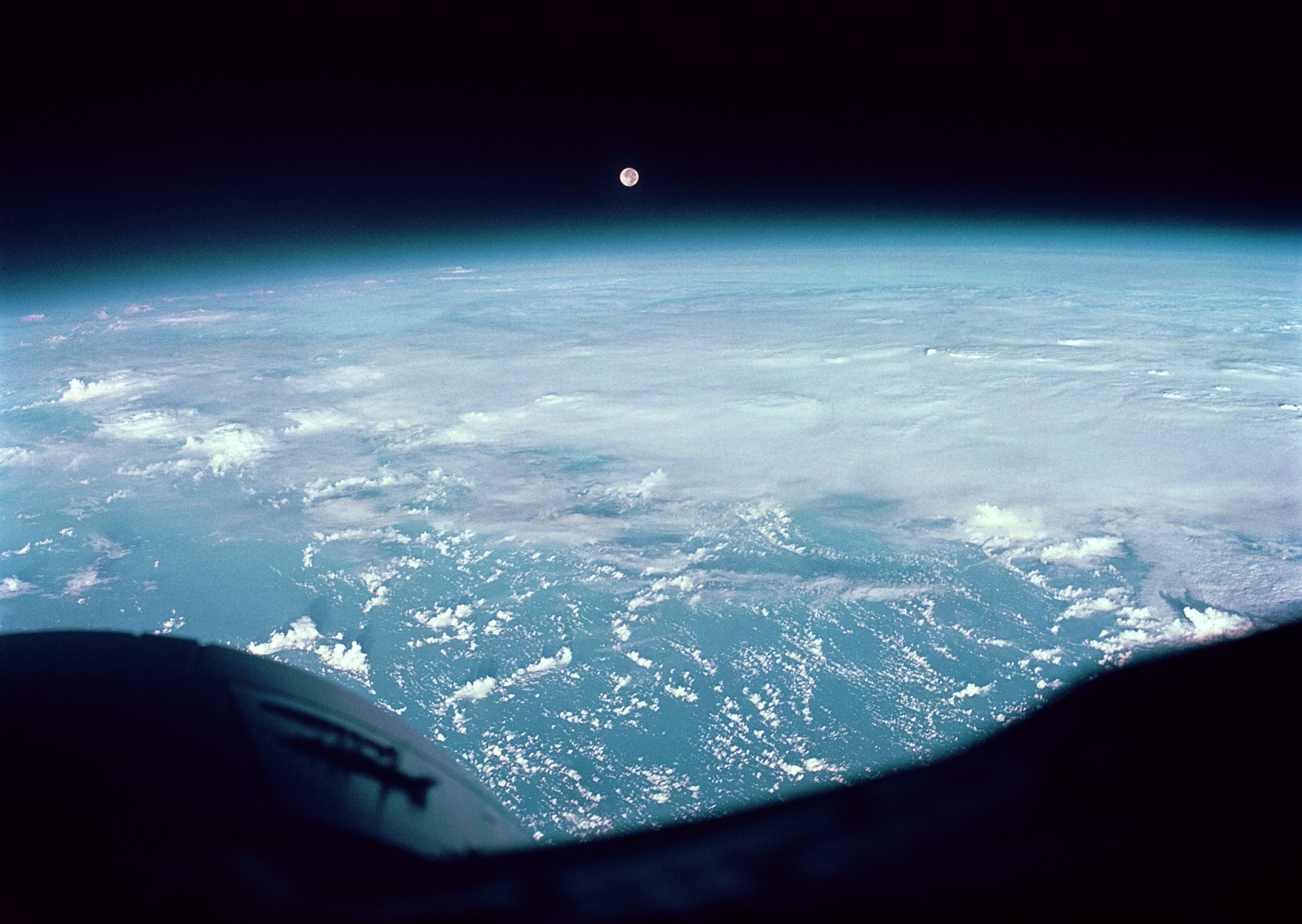
Moon and clouds over the Western Pacific as seen from Gemini 7

Later, the flight controllers ordered Lovell to don his suit, and Borman to get out of his. This was because the doctors wanted to see the effects of being suited and unsuited on the astronauts. At 148 hours into the flight, Borman got his chance to cool down. Finally, the NASA managers decided that there was little benefit in having the crew members suited, and so relented after a couple of days. Going suitless greatly improved the astronauts' comfort and mobility inside the cramped spacecraft.

The lessons learned from Gemini 5 allowed Lovell and Borman to have improved personal hygiene during their mission. They showered with an anti-dandruff shampoo for two weeks prior to the flight to curb the problems their predecessors had experienced with skin flakes accumulating inside the spacecraft and removal of the pressure suits in-flight also helped keep their skin more moist and less prone to drying out. They were also supplied with sanitation wipes which proved highly beneficial in keeping clean. Odors were not a problem except when they opened the storage bins where waste was stowed.

In their postflight debriefing, Borman and Lovell noted that the food rations had been generally of good quality, but they strongly disliked the freeze-dried protein bites and advised against them being included on future missions. They also suggested that more breakfast items would have been nice, to avoid including bite-sized food that could easily produce crumbs that get loose in the cabin, and improving the packaging of some items. Because of the lengthy mission, Gemini 7 had a significantly larger supply of food than previous flights, and the astronauts often found it difficult to remove the tightly packed food containers, some of which had also not been stowed in the correct order for the day of the flight they were intended to be eaten.

As part of the in-flight medical experiments, the crew were required to collect and save some of their bodily wastes for post-flight analysis, a task they described as less-than-enjoyable. The urine collection device proved particularly difficult and unpleasant to use, especially because of its habit of leaking urine, which happened several times during the flight. Borman suggested afterwards that a tube and valve mechanism be added to the spacecraft to simply release urine into space, an idea that would be realized on the Apollo command module.

The crew also strongly objected to the requirement that they record every use of drinking water and argued instead that they could simply use the meter on the water hose to gauge the amount consumed.

After five days, they had performed four orbital adjustment burns that put them in a circular 162-nautical-mile (300 km) orbit. This orbit would last for at least 100 days without decaying, more than stable enough for the passive target during a space rendezvous.

On their 31st orbit, Gemini 7 observed the underwater launch and exhaust trail of a Polaris missile from the submarine USS Benjamin Franklin off Florida.

=== UFO sighting ===
While in orbit, Borman unexpectedly radioed Houston with the words: "We have a bogey at ten o'clock high." Mission control immediately asked: "Gemini-7, is that the booster or is that an actual sighting?" Borman clarified: "We have debris up here — this is an actual sighting." The crew then reported "millions" and "trillions" of visible particles moving "about three or four miles" from their cabin. Lovell specifically referred to a bright, tumbling object and an indeterminate number of particles also described in the "trillions". Control queried whether what they witnessed were ejections from the booster. The source of this unidentified object (or objects) has never been determined.

=== Rendezvous ===
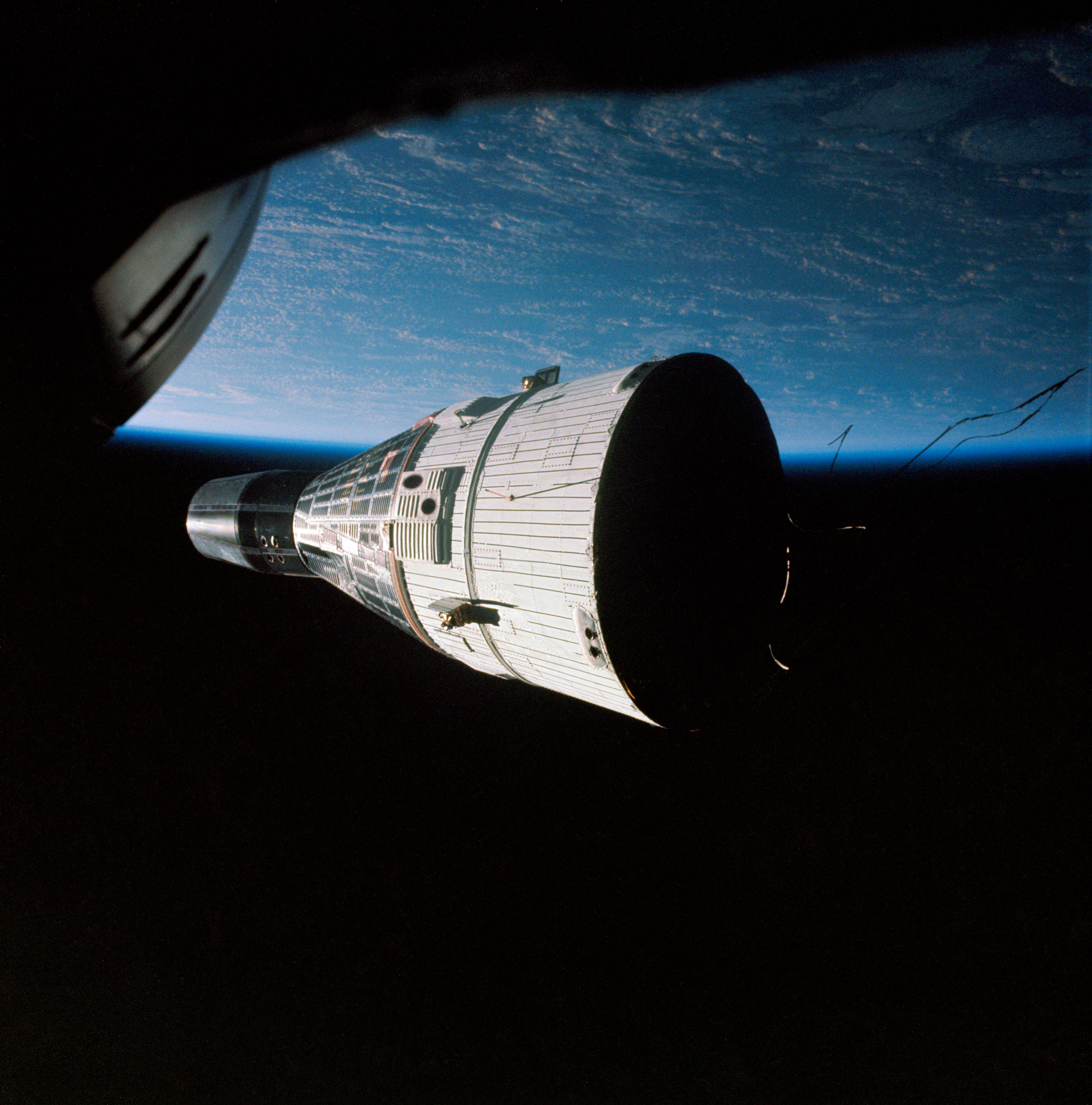
Gemini 7 as seen by Gemini 6A, December 1965

Gemini 6A was launched on December 15, after a three-day-long delay due to a malfunction and engine shutdown immediately after ignition. It entered into an 87-by-140-nautical-mile (161 by 259 km) orbit, and was briefly visible from Gemini 7 just after launch. Borman and Lovell were also able to see the contrail from the launch.

The plan called for the rendezvous to take place on the fourth orbit of Gemini 6A. Their first burn came 94 minutes after launch when they increased their velocity by 16.5 ft/s (5.0 m/s). Due to their lower orbit they were gaining on Gemini 7 and were 634 nautical miles (1,174 km) behind. The next burn was at 2 hours and 18 minutes when Gemini 6A made a phase adjustment to put them on the same orbital inclination as Gemini 7. They now only trailed by 261 nautical miles (483 km).

The radar on Gemini 6A first made contact with Gemini 7 at 3 hours and 15 minutes when they were 234 nautical miles (433 km) away. A third burn put them into a 146-by-148-nautical-mile (270 by 274 km) orbit. As they slowly gained, Walter Schirra put Gemini 6A's computer in charge of the rendezvous, and at five hours and four minutes, he saw a bright object that he at first thought was the star Sirius, but was in fact Gemini 7.

After several more burns the two spacecraft were only 130 feet (40 m) apart. The burns had only used 110 pounds (50 kg) of fuel on Gemini 6A, leaving plenty of fuel. During the next 270 minutes the crews moved as close as 1 foot (30 cm), talking over the radio. At one stage the spacecraft were station-keeping so well that neither crew had to make any burns for 20 minutes.

As the sleep periods approached, Gemini 6A made a separation burn and slowly drifted out to 16 kilometers, to prevent an accidental collision in the night. Gemini 6A reentered the next day, landing within 9.7 nautical miles (18.0 km) of the planned site, the first truly accurate atmospheric reentry.

=== Last few days ===
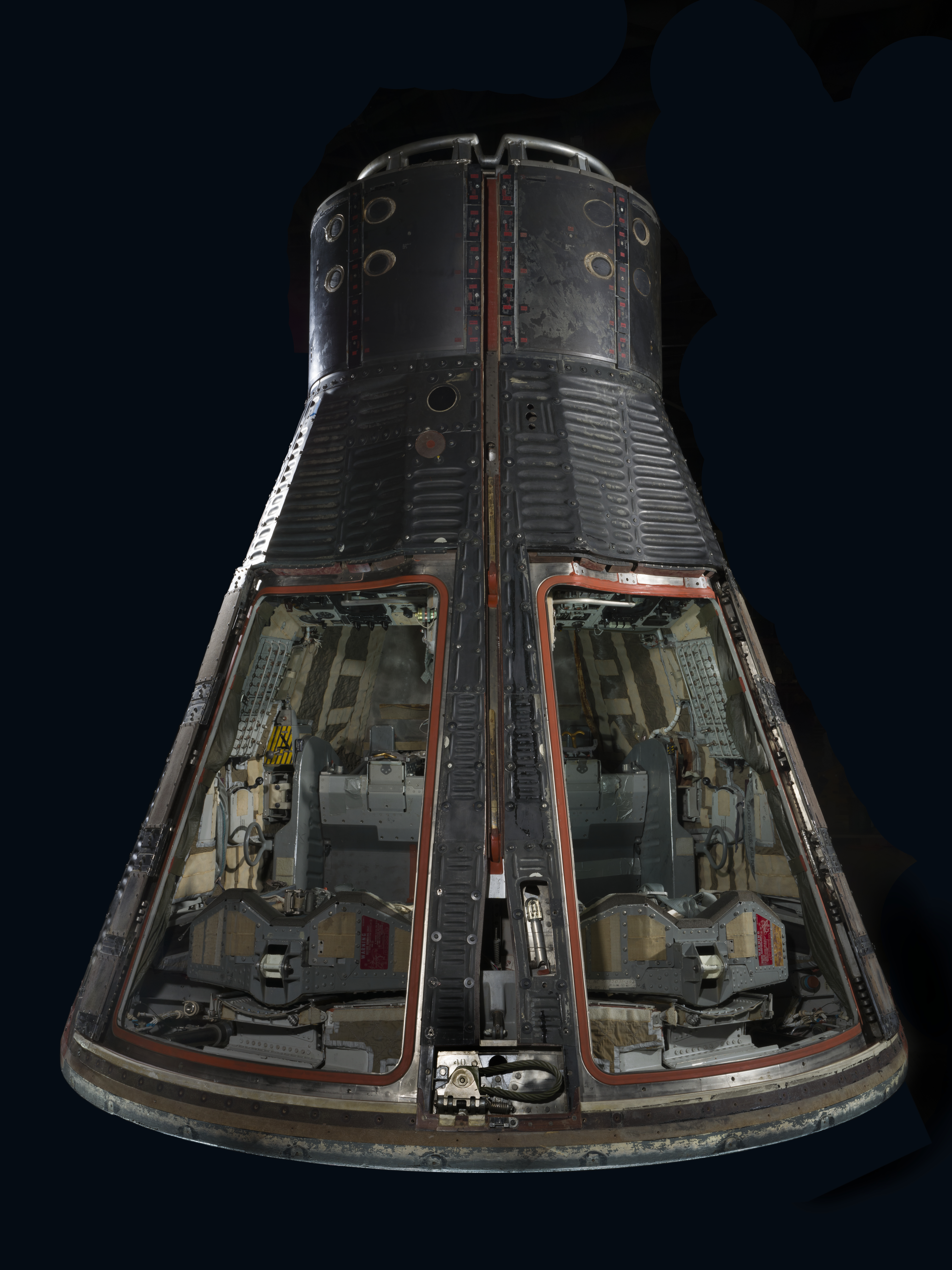
Gemini VII Capsule

By this time, the novelty of spaceflight had worn off for the crew of Gemini 7. They had spent 11 days in space and had three more to go. They were doing little more than drifting around the Earth and the incentive of the rendezvous was over. Borman read Roughing It by Mark Twain and Lovell Drums along the Mohawk by Walter D. Edmonds.

In the Discovery Channel 2008 documentary When We Left Earth: The NASA Missions second episode titled "Friends and Rivals", Borman states the last three days of the mission were "bad".

Malfunctions began: in a repeat of Gemini 5, some of the thrusters stopped working. After the flight this was traced to the fact that they had an old type of laminate in the thrust chamber. Also on the 12th day, the fuel cells started to give only a partial amount of power. The ship's batteries were enough to sustain it for the remainder of the flight.

Finally the last day of the mission arrived and the crew stored everything for reentry. The retro-rockets worked perfectly after 14 days in space. They landed within 6.4 nautical miles (11.9 km) of the targeted landing point.

The crewmen were somewhat weakened by their time in space, but both were in good health on the recovery ship USS Wasp. During recovery, they joked to Mission Control about getting married after having spent so long together in space.

The Gemini 7 and 6A missions were supported by the following U.S. Department of Defense resources: 10,125 personnel, 125 aircraft and 16 ships.

== Insignia ==
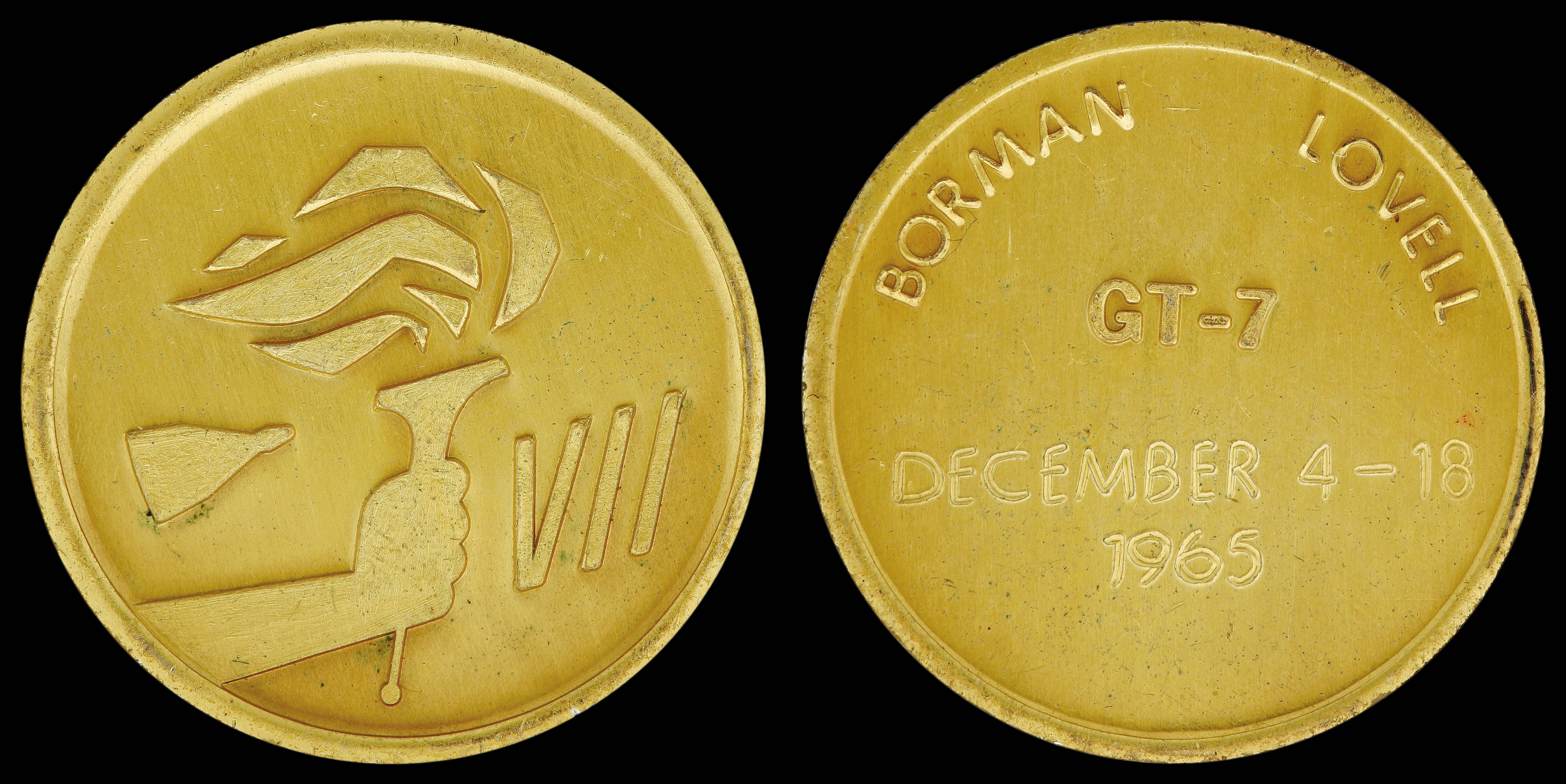
Gemini 7 space-flown Fliteline Medallion

The patch features an Olympic torch, symbolizing the marathon-like length of the mission. There is a small stylized image of a Gemini spacecraft and the Roman numeral VII. The crew did not put its names on the patch, although souvenir versions did include the flight and crew names. The crew patch was designed by Houston artist and animator Bill Bradley.

As with a few other missions, the backup crew produced a spoof of the insignia, featuring an unlit torch, a lighter and the words "NEED A LIGHT – FRANK? JIM?"

== Spacecraft location ==
The spacecraft is on display at the National Air and Space Museum, Washington, D.C.

== See also ==
- Space capsule
- Space exploration
- Space suit
- Splashdown
- U.S. space exploration history on U.S. stamps
- Timeline of longest spaceflights

== Bibliography ==
- Collins, Michael (2009). Carrying the Fire: An Astronaut's Journeys. Lindbergh, Charles (foreword). Cooper Square Press. ISBN 978-0-374-53194-2.
