= Weatherford Public Schools =

School district in Oklahoma

Weatherford Public Schools is a public school district based in Weatherford, Oklahoma, United States.

In addition to the city of Weatherford, the district also serves rural areas in southeastern Custer and northeastern Washita counties.

The mascot for Weatherford Public Schools is the Eagle.

== Schools ==
- Grades 9-12
  - Weatherford High School
- Grades 6-8
  - Weatherford Middle School
- Grades 4-5
  - Weatherford West Elementary School
- Grades 2-3
  - Weatherford East Elementary School
- Grades PK-1
  - Burcham Elementary School

== Student demographics ==
The following figures are as of October 2008

- Total District Enrollment: 1,818
- Student enrollment by campus
  - Weatherford High School (500)
  - Weatherford Middle School (379)
  - Weatherford West Elementary School (244)
  - Weatherford East Elementary School (247)
  - Burcham Elementary School (448)
- Student enrollment by ethnicity
  - White: 1,377 (75.74%)
  - Native American: 192 (10.56%)
  - Hispanic: 191 (10.50%)
  - African American: 37 (2.04%)
  - Asian: 18 (0.99%)
  - Pacific Islander: 3 (0.17%)
