= Barry Christian =

American politician (1971/72–2026)

- Born: 1971 or 1972; Sayre, Oklahoma
- Died: April 30, 2026 (aged 54)
- Occupations: Drilling consultant, politician
- Website: barrychristianok.com

Barry Christian (died 2026) was an American drilling consultant, politician and Republican Oklahoma state Senate candidate from Sayre, Oklahoma, who went missing and was found dead two days later.

== Life ==
Christian was born in Sayre, Oklahoma. He attended Weatherford High School and worked as a drilling consultant for 35 years before running for Senate. He had three children.

== Disappearance and death ==
Barry Christian was reported missing after not showing up for a scheduled meeting on April 28, 2026. He was found dead two days later inside his gray Ram truck, parked in a rural area near Oklahoma State Highway 30. On August 11th, 2026, officials determined the cause of death to be suicide. He died of a self-inflicted gunshot wound.
