= Stafford Air & Space Museum =

Museum in Weatherford, Oklahoma

Coordinates: 35°32′40″N 98°40′12″W

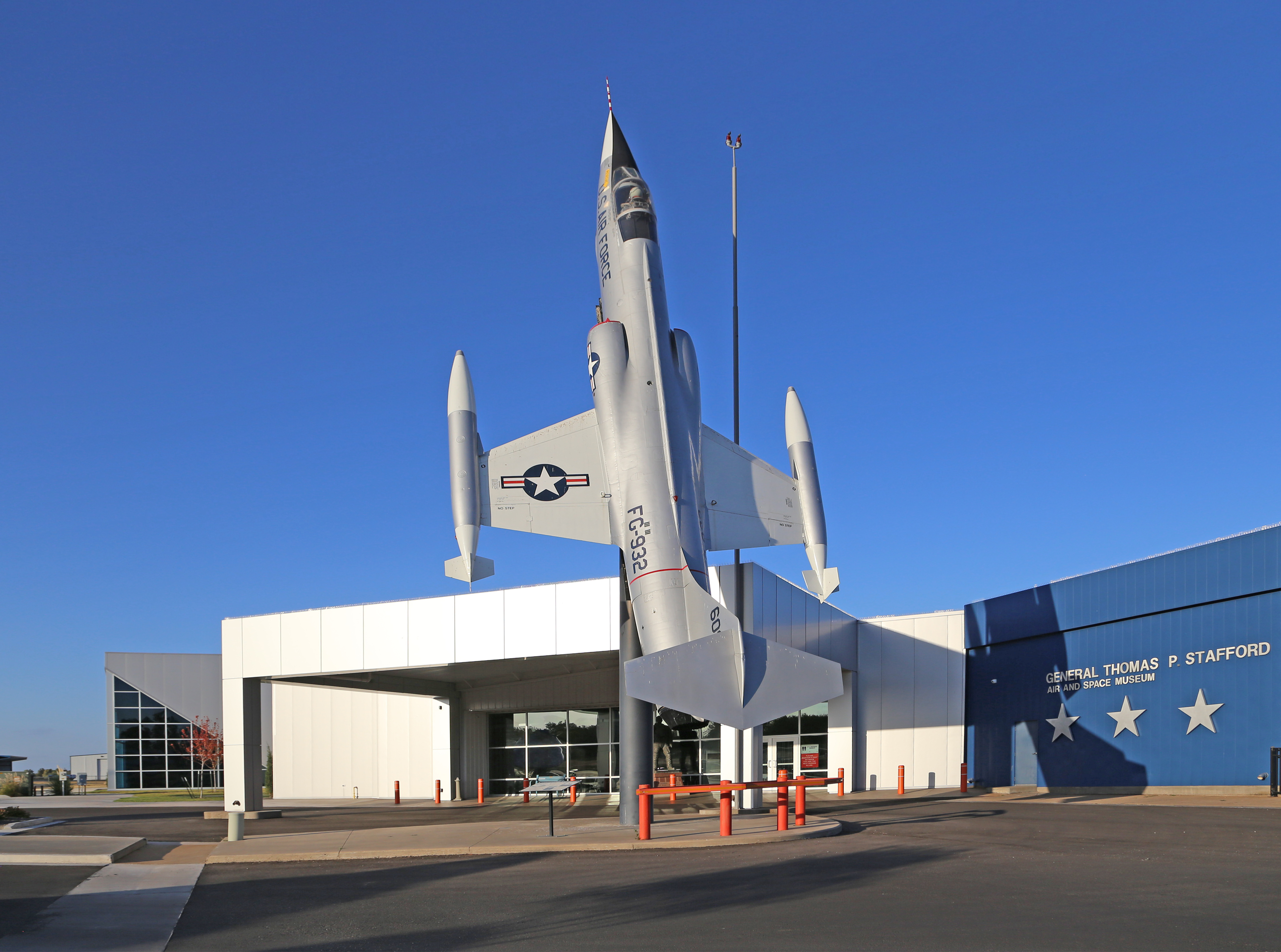
Stafford Air & Space Museum entrance

The Stafford Air & Space Museum is located in Weatherford, Oklahoma, United States. The museum, named after NASA astronaut and Weatherford native Thomas P. Stafford, became a Smithsonian Affiliate in June 2010.

The museum's displays include Stafford's Apollo 10 spacesuit, the Gemini 6A spacecraft he piloted in 1965, artifacts from the Space Shuttle program, the Hubble Space Telescope, the Mir Space Station, a Moon rock, a Titan II missile, a Mark 6 re-entry vehicle, and a collection of over 20 historic aircraft.

The museum is located at the Thomas P. Stafford Airport.

== Name ==
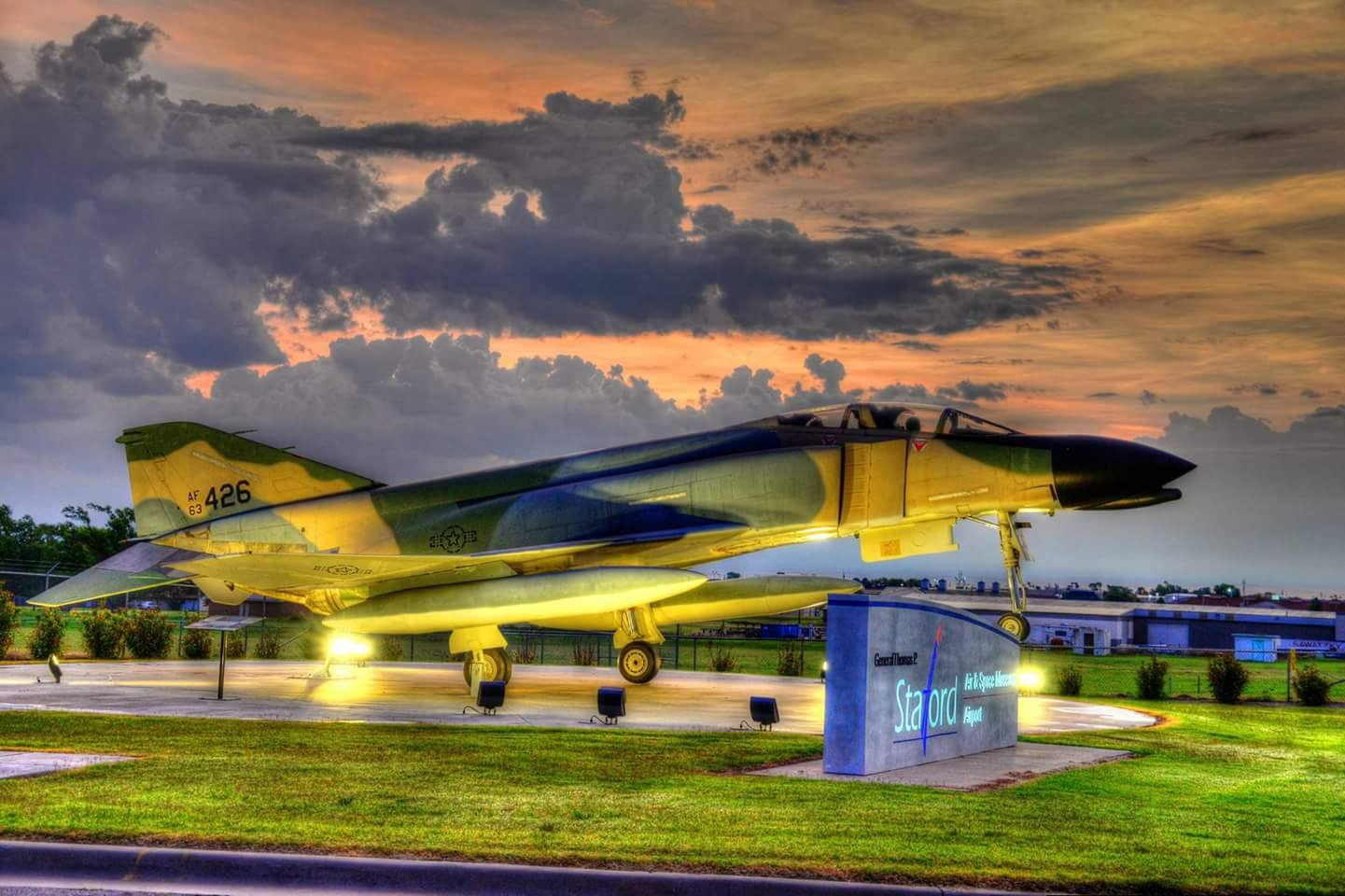
The F-4 Phantom at the entrance of the Stafford Air & Space Museum

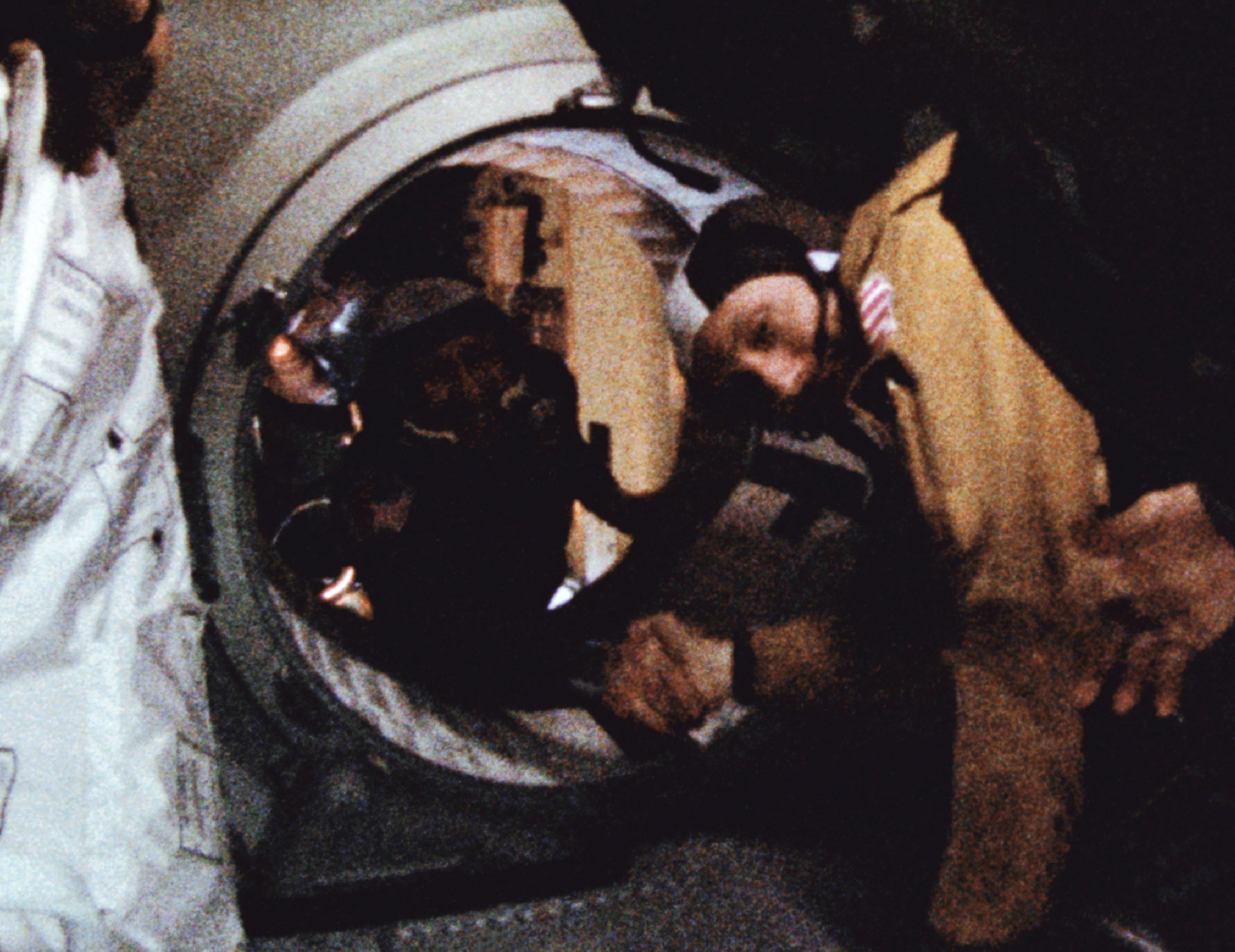
Stafford and Alexei Leonov shake hands through the hatch (on display) connecting the U.S. and Soviet capsules during the 1975 Apollo–Soyuz mission

The museum is named for astronaut and flight pioneer Lt. Gen. Thomas P. Stafford, a native of Weatherford and one of only 24 people to have traveled to the Moon. Graduating from the U.S. Naval Academy, Stafford is a recipient of the Congressional Space Medal of Honor. A veteran of four space flights, he piloted Gemini 6A in 1965, commanded Gemini 9A in 1966, flew the 1969 Moon-orbiting mission Apollo 10, and commanded the American capsule of the 1975 Apollo–Soyuz Test Project.

== History ==
The museum opened in 1983 in two rooms at the Weatherford airport. By 2006, it had expanded to four buildings.

The museum purchased a Space Shuttle simulator in 2016. It began fundraising for an 18,000 sq ft (1,700 m^{2}) expansion in 2017.

== Exhibits ==
The center boasts one of the few Titan II launch vehicles on display. The huge rocket body spans the back of a display gallery from one side of the building to the other. Numerous items acquired from the Smithsonian and on display include: a Gemini flight suit, space food, survival items flown to the Moon on Apollo 11, and the flight pressure suit Stafford wore on Apollo 10, the first flight of the Apollo Lunar Module which orbited the Moon.

The hatch through which U.S. astronauts and Russian cosmonauts docked and greeted each other in space during the 1975 Apollo–Soyuz mission is on display in the museum. Stafford is pictured reaching through the hatch, shaking hands with Russian cosmonaut Alexei Leonov. The uniforms that the two astronauts were wearing at the time are also on display.

Other exhibits include retired aircraft, such as a Russian MiG-21R and a F-16. Full-size replicas displayed include the Wright Flyer, Spirit of St. Louis, Apollo Command Module, and Gemini spacecraft. The museum also features the Rose & Tom Luczo Educational Center, which includes a flight simulation computer lab, a kids' library, and a Talon A3 Motion-Based Flight Simulator that runs X-Plane 11 and Microsoft Flight Simulator X. Also on display is a TP-82 Cosmonaut survival pistol given to Stafford by Leonov.

As of March 5, 2018, the museum has acquired a Fairchild Republic A-10 Thunderbolt II, also known as the "Warthog," which is on display outside the museum. In July 2018, the Gemini 6A spacecraft was moved to the museum.

=== Early aviation ===
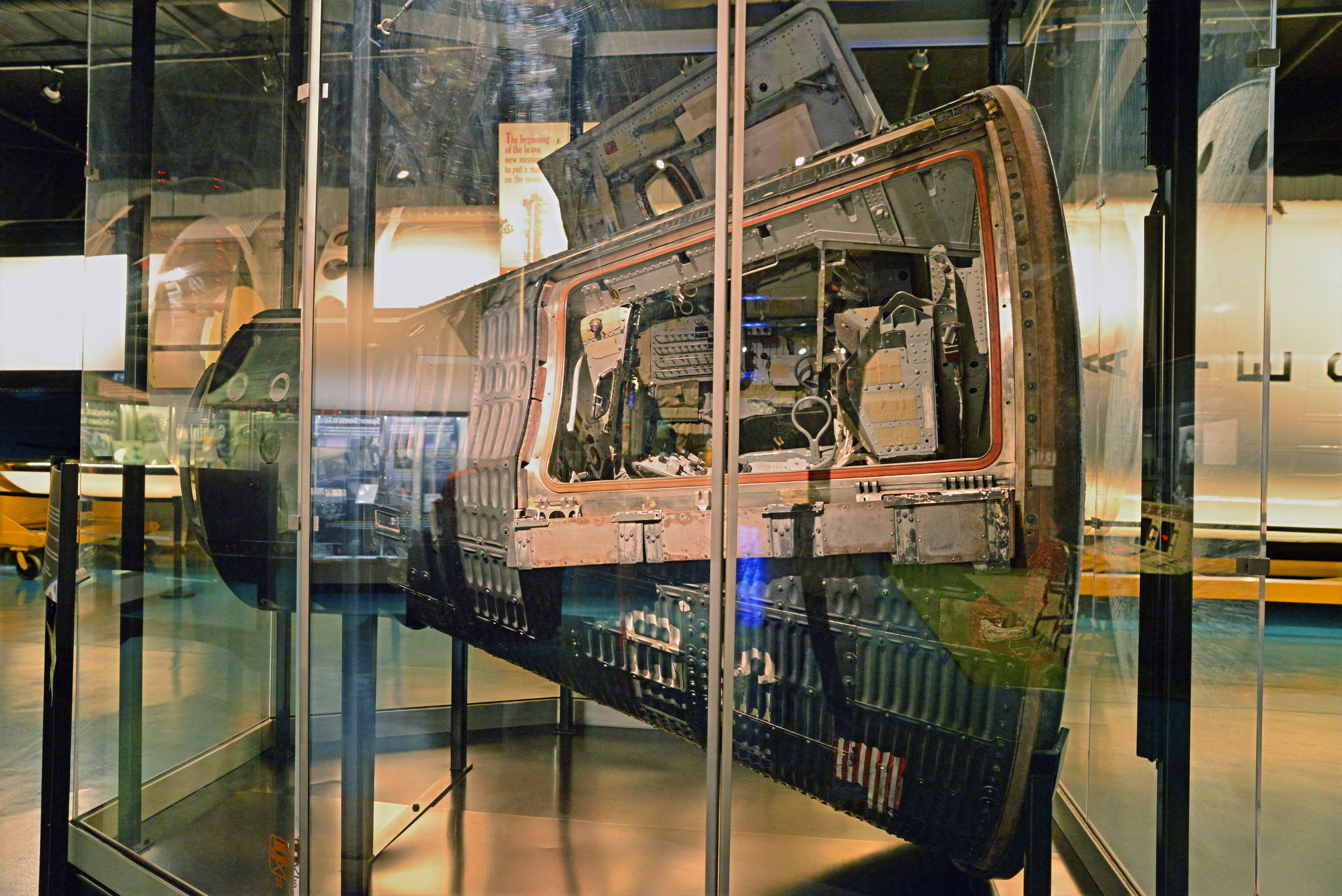
Gemini 6A spacecraft, flown in 1965 by Stafford and Wally Schirra

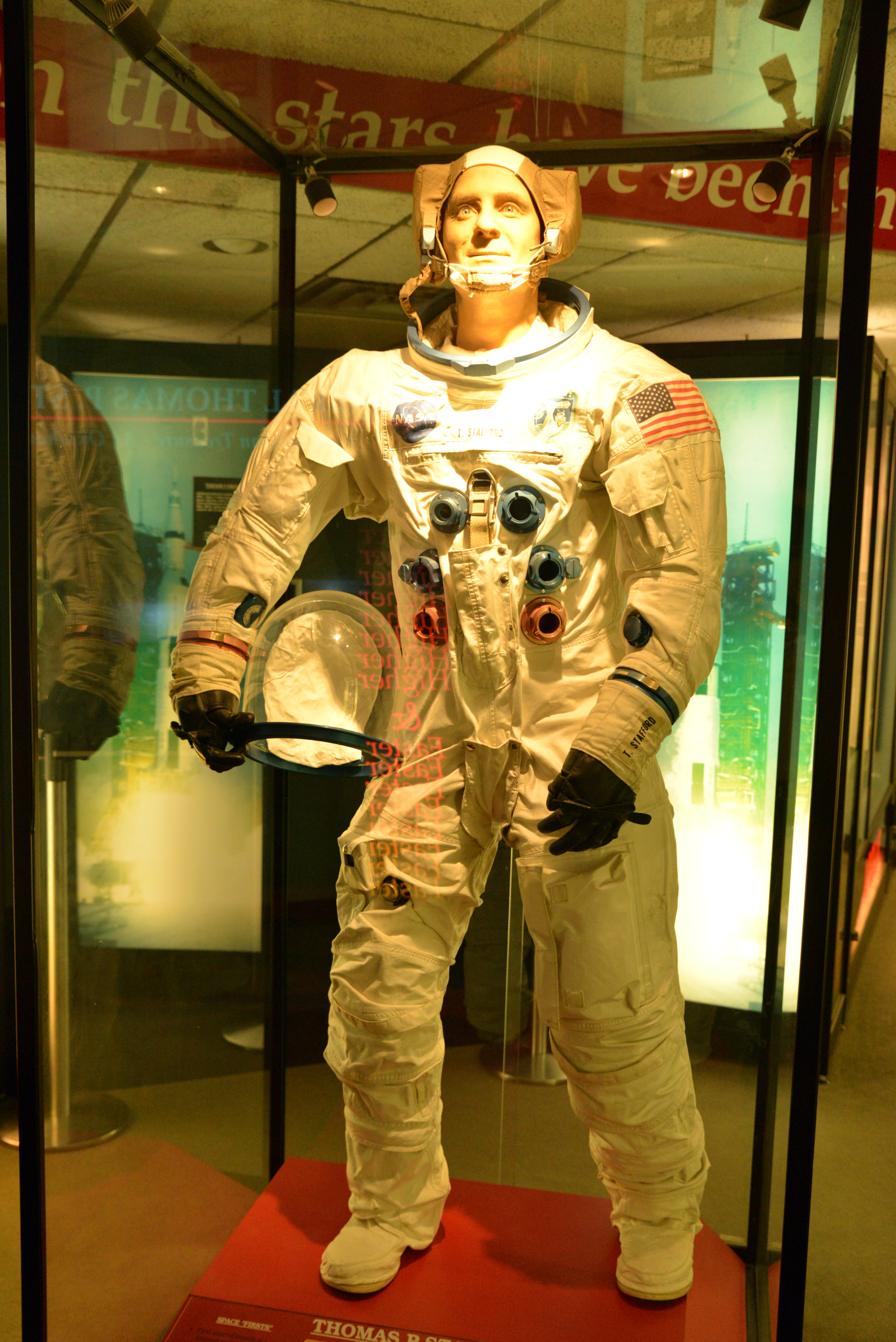
Thomas Stafford's Apollo 10 spacesuit

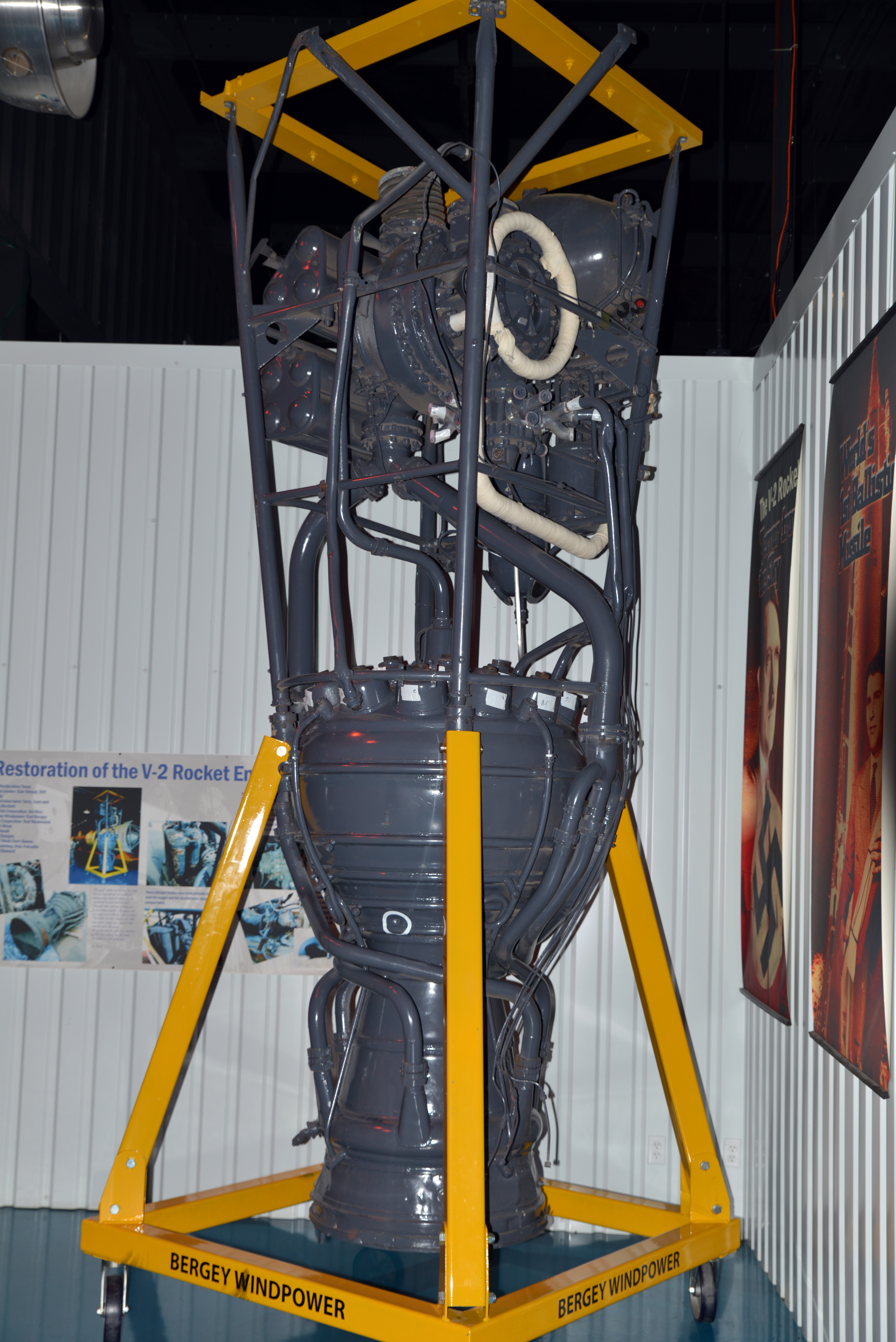
V-2 rocket engine

- Wright Flyer (full-scale, flyable replica)
- Blériot XI (full-scale replica)
- Curtiss Pusher (full-scale, flyable replica)
- Sopwith Pup (full-scale replica)
- Spirit of St. Louis (full-scale replica)

=== Early rocketry ===
- Goddard rocket (full-scale replica)
- V-2 rocket engine
- Sputnik 1 (full-scale replica)
- Explorer 1 (full-scale replica)

=== Mercury, Gemini, and Apollo programs ===
- Lunar Sample collected by Gene Cernan on Apollo 17
- Congressional Space Medal of Honor presented to Thomas P. Stafford in 1993
- Gemini 6A spacecraft
- Gen. Stafford's Gemini space suit
- Apollo 10 space suit
- Lunar Module Checklist
- Apollo–Soyuz Docking Ring
- Mission Control console from Johnson Space Center (actual used artifact)
- F-1 rocket engine
- J-2 rocket engine
- Titan II rocket
- Full scale Apollo Lunar Module replica
- Apollo Command and Service Module (full-scale replica)
- Gemini spacecraft (full-scale replica)
- 1/72 scale models of all of the man-rated rockets of the "Space Race"
- Astronaut Maneuvering Unit model

=== Modern space and aviation ===
- Space Shuttle main engine
- Shuttle solid rocket booster segment
- Mark 6 nuclear warhead
- 1/15th scale Hubble Space Telescope
- Rocket "Crawler Shoe"
- Bell X-1 (full-scale replica)
- F-86 "Sabre" fighter
- MiG-21R "Fishbed" fighter
- T-38 "Talon" trainer
- T-33 trainer
- B61 thermonuclear bomb
- F-16 "Fighting Falcon"
- F-104 "Starfighter"
- F-4 Phantom
- A-10 Thunderbolt II "Warthog"
- Lockheed F-117 Nighthawk USAF #82-0819 "Raven Beauty"
