= Weatherford High School (Oklahoma) =

Location
- 1500 N. Washington; Weatherford, Oklahoma; United States; 35.5413°N 98.6928°W

Information
- School district: Weatherford Public Schools
- Principal: Mark Shadid
- Teaching staff: 34.66 (FTE)
- Enrollment: 669 (2023-2024)
- Student to teacher ratio: 19.30
- Color
- Mascot: Eagle
- Website: whs.wpsok.org

Weatherford High School, sometimes abbreviated as WHS, is a high school in Weatherford, Oklahoma, United States.

== Notable alumni ==
- Barry Christian, politician
- Ethan Downs, NFL defensive end for the Jacksonville Jaguars
- NASA astronaut Thomas P. Stafford, Commander of Apollo 10 which orbited the Moon in 1969.
