= Weatherford, Oklahoma =

- City
- Location in Oklahoma Weatherford, Oklahoma (the United States)
- Coordinates: 35°32′16″N 98°41′07″W
- Country: United States
- State: Oklahoma
- County: Custer

Government
  - Mayor: Mike Brown

Area
  - Total: 7.66 sq mi (19.84 km^{2})
  - Land: 7.66 sq mi (19.83 km^{2})
  - Water: 0 sq mi (0.00 km^{2})
- Elevation: 1,627 ft (496 m)

Population (2020)
  - Total: 12,076
  - Density: 1,577.0/sq mi (608.87/km^{2})
- Time zone: UTC-6 (Central (CST))
  - Summer (DST): UTC-5 (CDT)
- ZIP Code: 73096
- Area code: 580
- FIPS code: 40-79450
- GNIS feature ID: 2412198
- Website: www.cityofweatherford.com

Weatherford is a city in Custer County, Oklahoma, United States. The population was 12,076 at the time of the 2020 census, an increase of about 11.5% from the 10,833 recorded in the 2010 census. Route 66 follows Main Street through the city. The Stafford Air & Space Museum honors astronaut Thomas P. Stafford.

== Geography ==
According to the United States Census Bureau, the city has a total area of 7.05 square miles (18.3 km^{2}), all land.

=== Climate ===
Climate data for Weatherford, Oklahoma (1991–2020)
Month	Jan	Feb	Mar	Apr	May	Jun	Jul	Aug	Sep	Oct	Nov	Dec	Year
Mean daily maximum °F (°C)	49.0 (9.4)	53.5 (11.9)	62.6 (17.0)	71.4 (21.9)	80.3 (26.8)	89.1 (31.7)	94.2 (34.6)	92.7 (33.7)	84.9 (29.4)	73.5 (23.1)	60.5 (15.8)	49.8 (9.9)	71.8 (22.1)
Daily mean °F (°C)	37.3 (2.9)	41.7 (5.4)	50.6 (10.3)	59.2 (15.1)	68.5 (20.3)	77.6 (25.3)	82.4 (28.0)	80.6 (27.0)	73.2 (22.9)	61.2 (16.2)	49.0 (9.4)	38.9 (3.8)	60.0 (15.6)
Mean daily minimum °F (°C)	25.7 (−3.5)	29.9 (−1.2)	38.6 (3.7)	47.0 (8.3)	56.8 (13.8)	66.1 (18.9)	70.7 (21.5)	68.5 (20.3)	61.6 (16.4)	48.8 (9.3)	37.4 (3.0)	28.1 (−2.2)	48.3 (9.0)
Average precipitation inches (mm)	1.06 (27)	1.18 (30)	2.28 (58)	2.79 (71)	4.48 (114)	3.95 (100)	2.39 (61)	3.75 (95)	2.42 (61)	3.10 (79)	1.27 (32)	1.43 (36)	30.1 (764)
Average snowfall inches (cm)	1.2 (3.0)	2.2 (5.6)	0.5 (1.3)	0.0 (0.0)	0.0 (0.0)	0.0 (0.0)	0.0 (0.0)	0.0 (0.0)	0.0 (0.0)	0.1 (0.25)	0.3 (0.76)	1.4 (3.6)	5.7 (14.51)
Source: NOAA

== History ==
Situated on land made available to homesteaders as part of the Cheyenne-Arapaho Roundup and Removal on April 19, 1892, Weatherford was incorporated on August 3, 1898, on a townsite location chosen by banking and civic leader Beeks Erick. By 1900, the town's population was 1,017. The town's original post office was located approximately two miles north of town, on William John and Lorinda Powell Weatherford's homestead. Lorinda Weatherford served as its postmaster and namesake. In its early years, farming and ranching provided the major economic base, with corn, cotton, and maize the major crops. Additionally, a brick plant, a cement plant, and a broom factory provided jobs as well as supplies for early residents.

== Demographics ==
Historical population
Census	Pop.	Note	%±
1900	1,017		—
1910	2,118		108.3%
1920	1,929		−8.9%
1930	2,417		25.3%
1940	2,504		3.6%
1950	3,529		40.9%
1960	4,499		27.5%
1970	7,959		76.9%
1980	9,640		21.1%
1990	10,124		5.0%
2000	9,859		−2.6%
2010	10,833		9.9%
2020	12,076		11.5%

=== 2020 census ===
As of the 2020 census, Weatherford had a population of 12,076. The median age was 26.0 years. 21.9% of residents were under the age of 18 and 11.8% of residents were 65 years of age or older. For every 100 females there were 95.8 males, and for every 100 females age 18 and over there were 92.5 males age 18 and over.

99.2% of residents lived in urban areas, while 0.8% lived in rural areas.

There were 4,748 households in Weatherford, of which 28.8% had children under the age of 18 living in them. Of all households, 38.9% were married-couple households, 24.1% were households with a male householder and no spouse or partner present, and 29.2% were households with a female householder and no spouse or partner present. About 33.5% of all households were made up of individuals and 8.6% had someone living alone who was 65 years of age or older.

There were 5,503 housing units, of which 13.7% were vacant. Among occupied housing units, 46.3% were owner-occupied and 53.7% were renter-occupied. The homeowner vacancy rate was 2.1% and the rental vacancy rate was 15.3%.

Racial composition as of the 2020 census
Race	Percent
White	73.2%
Black or African American	3.0%
American Indian and Alaska Native	6.4%
Asian	1.6%
Native Hawaiian and Other Pacific Islander	<0.1%
Some other race	5.1%
Two or more races	10.6%
Hispanic or Latino (of any race)	13.3%

== Economy ==
Kodak's 50-year old manufacturing plant in Weatherford was subject to a $15 million expansion in 2017 related to flexographic packaging plates.

Weatherford is a hub for multiple oil and natural gas industry leaders such as Oneok Field Services and Chesapeake Energy, as well as a location for wind power production.

== Attractions ==
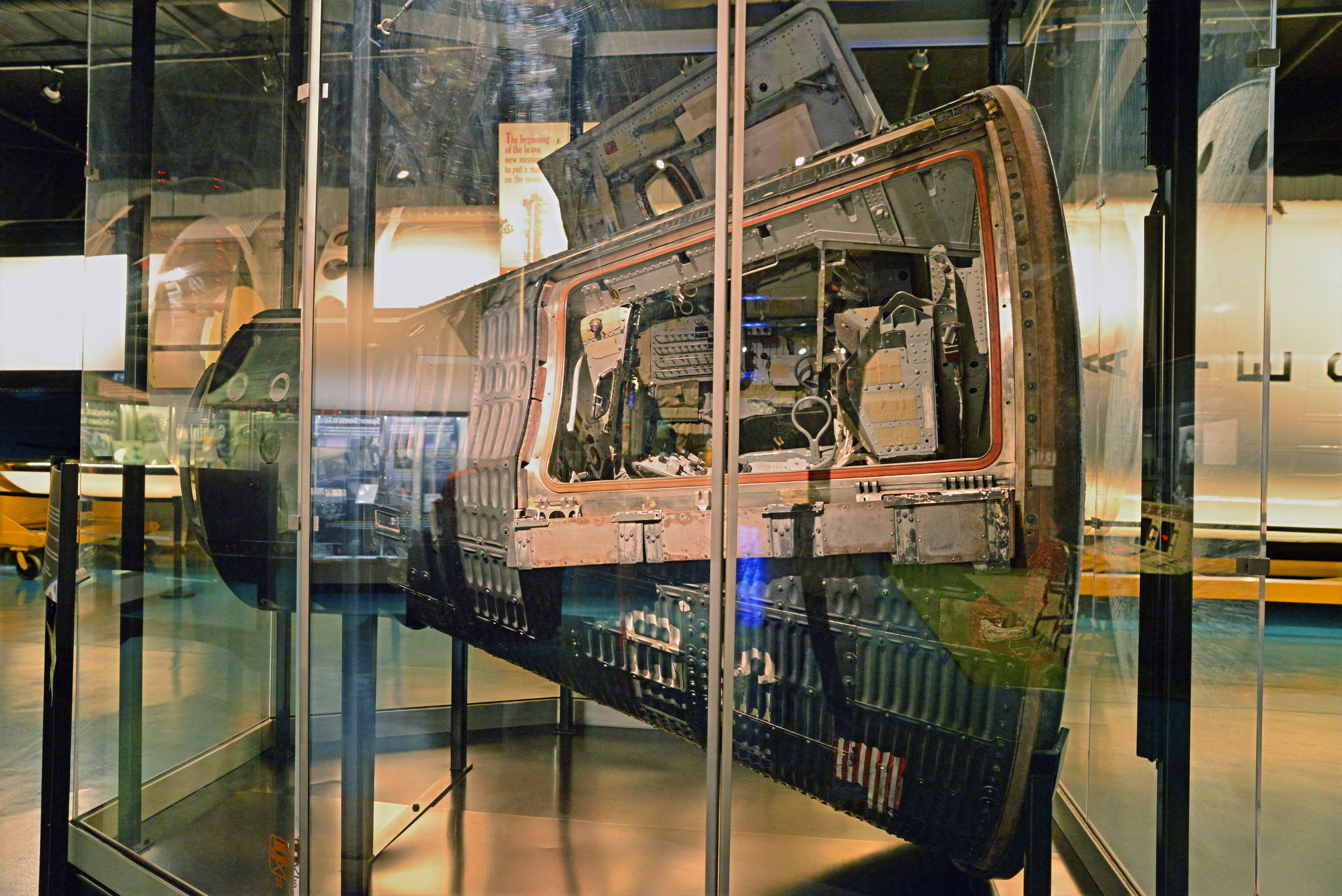
Gemini 6A space capsule at the Stafford Air & Space Museum

The 40,000-square-foot (3,700 m^{2}) Stafford Air & Space Museum is home to the Gemini 6A spacecraft, an actual Titan II missile, WWII V-2 rocket, Saturn V F-1 engine as well as flown space suits, flight equipment, Space Shuttle engines, and a Moon rock. Aircraft displays include an actual Sopwith Pup, F-86, F-104, T-33, T-38, F-16, and a rare MIG-21, as well as full-scale replicas of the Wright Flyer, Bleriot and Spirit of St. Louis. Weatherford is the hometown of astronaut Thomas P. Stafford, veteran of four space flights and commander of the Gemini 9, Apollo 10 missions and the Apollo–Soyuz project. The museum is located at the Thomas P. Stafford Airport.

Weatherford also has The Oklahoma Heartland of America Museum, which opened in 2007. The 12,000 square foot building contains many artifacts from the late 1800s through the 1950s in thirty-two major historical exhibits, including a 1931 Model A Ford sports coupe, and features three historic theme buildings (diner, school house, and blacksmith's shop) on the museum grounds.

The City of Weatherford has twelve parks containing over eight hundred acres, including Heritage Park, across from City Hall, which displays a wind turbine blade for close inspection.

=== Historic places ===
Weatherford has four NRHP-listed sites including the Owl Blacksmith Shop at 208 W. Rainey.

== Education ==
At the turn of the 20th century, Weatherford beat out several other cities vying to become the home to Southwestern Oklahoma State University (SWOSU), at the time known as Southwestern Oklahoma State College. Founded in 1901, it was first known as Southwestern State Teachers College. SWOSU became the largest institute of higher education in Western Oklahoma, with more than 4,200 undergraduates and post graduates by 2015. SWOSU is placed in Tier 2 of the "Regional Universities (West)" category in the 2016 edition of the U.S. News & World Report Education Rankings and offers associate, bachelor's, master's and professional doctorate degree programs. It is one of two universities in the state that feature an accredited school of pharmacy.

Parochial schools in the area include ACSI accredited Western Oklahoma Christian School, which has campuses in Weatherford, as well as nearby Clinton and Elk City, serving grades pre-kindergarten through six. Corn Bible Academy, located in the Washita County town of Corn, serves students in grades seven through twelve.

Weatherford Public Schools provides public education services to the city of Weatherford as well as surrounding rural areas in southeastern Custer and northeastern Washita counties. The district operates three elementary schools, one middle school, and one high school.

Western Technology Center (WTC) provides the opportunity for adults and high school students to get occupationally-specific training. Weatherford Public Schools is a member of the WTC district. As a member of the WTC district, high school juniors and seniors living in the Weatherford School District have the opportunity to attend classes at WTC. High school students who are residents of the WTC District can enroll in WTC full-time training on a tuition-free basis. Adult students are allowed to attend classes on a tuition basis.

== Wind energy ==
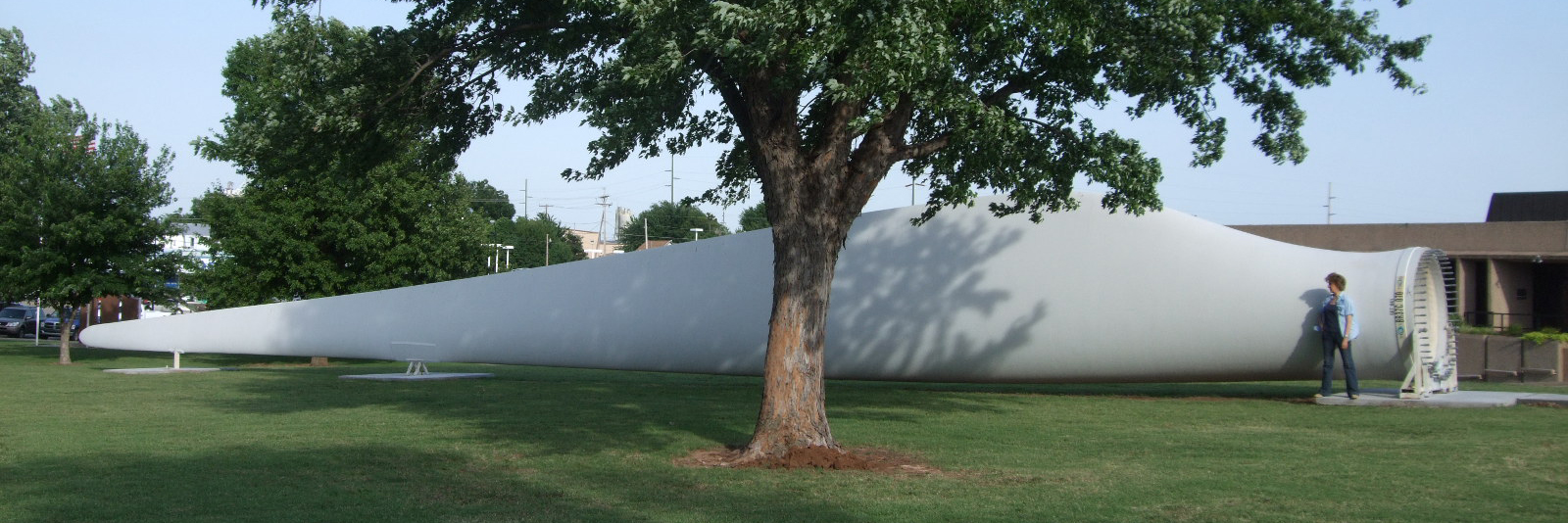
Wind turbine blade on display in Weatherford

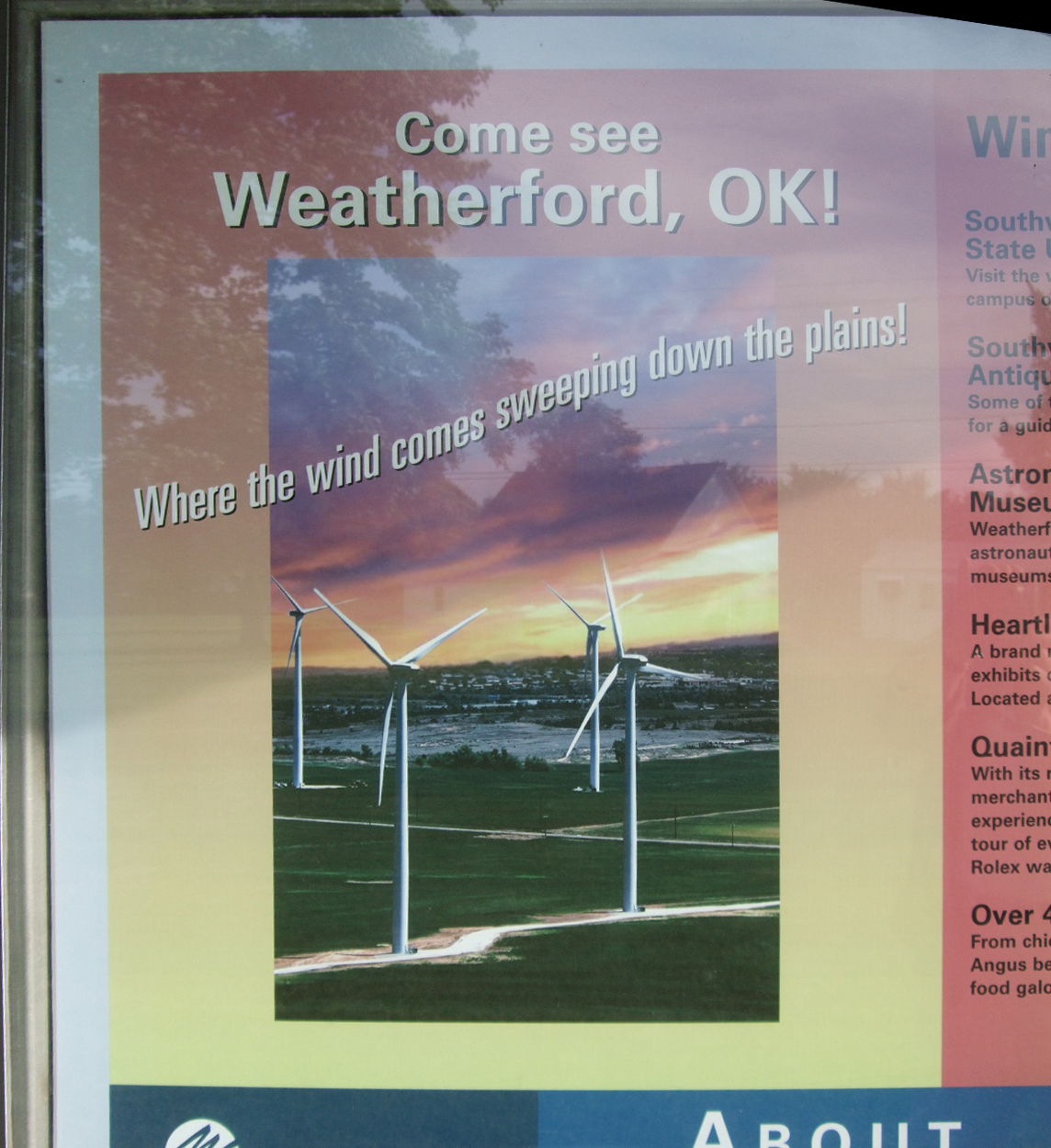
Wind power promotional poster near the blade display

Weatherford is home to the wind power facility called the Weatherford Wind Energy Center, with 98 GE 1.5 MW Wind Turbines, for a total nameplate capacity of 147 MW.

== Transportation ==
Weatherford was, for many years, situated on a main line of the now defunct Rock Island Railroad, which is still in operation by Farmrail Corporation. With the advent of the automobile, the city was initially located on State Highway 3 starting in the early 1920s, which was redesignated as U.S. Route 66 in 1926 and paved entirely across Western Oklahoma by 1932. Route 66, which followed Main Street through the city, was lined with various tourist businesses including cafes, motels and gasoline stations like most other cities along the highway. Several blocks of Main Street were also paved in brick until the mid-1950s when it was widened to a four-lane thoroughfare. Interstate 40 was completed east and west of the city in 1960 generally paralleling the old U.S. 66 alignment, which was retained as frontage road. The I-40 bypass skirting Weatherford to the south was completed in July, 1970 the same day the I-40 bypass was opened to traffic 15 miles (24 km) to the west at Clinton and followed shortly thereafter by bypasses at Elk City and Sayre. In addition to Route 66 and I-40, Weatherford is also served by north–south State Highway 54.

The Thomas P Stafford Airport (KOJA; FAA ID: OJA), features a 5100’ x 75’ paved runway.

Commercial air transportation is available at Will Rogers World Airport, about 69 miles to the east.

== Notable people ==
- Jeff Banister – Manager of the Texas Rangers (baseball)
- Brett Chapman – Attorney and advocate for Native American civil rights
- Paul D. Eaton – U.S. Army Major General (retired), former commanding general in Iraq
- Gordon Friesen – writer
- Cliff Keen – former head wrestling coach, University of Michigan
- Braden Looper – Major League Baseball pitcher
- James C. Nance – Oklahoma community newspaper chain publisher and former Speaker of the Oklahoma House of Representatives, President pro tempore of the Oklahoma Senate and member Uniform Law Commission
- Wes Sims – Professional football player
- Thomas P. Stafford – Astronaut, orbited the Moon on Apollo 10
- Stanley Vestal – Author of the American Old West
