= Gemini 6A =

1965 manned United States spaceflight in NASA's Gemini program

Gemini VI-A
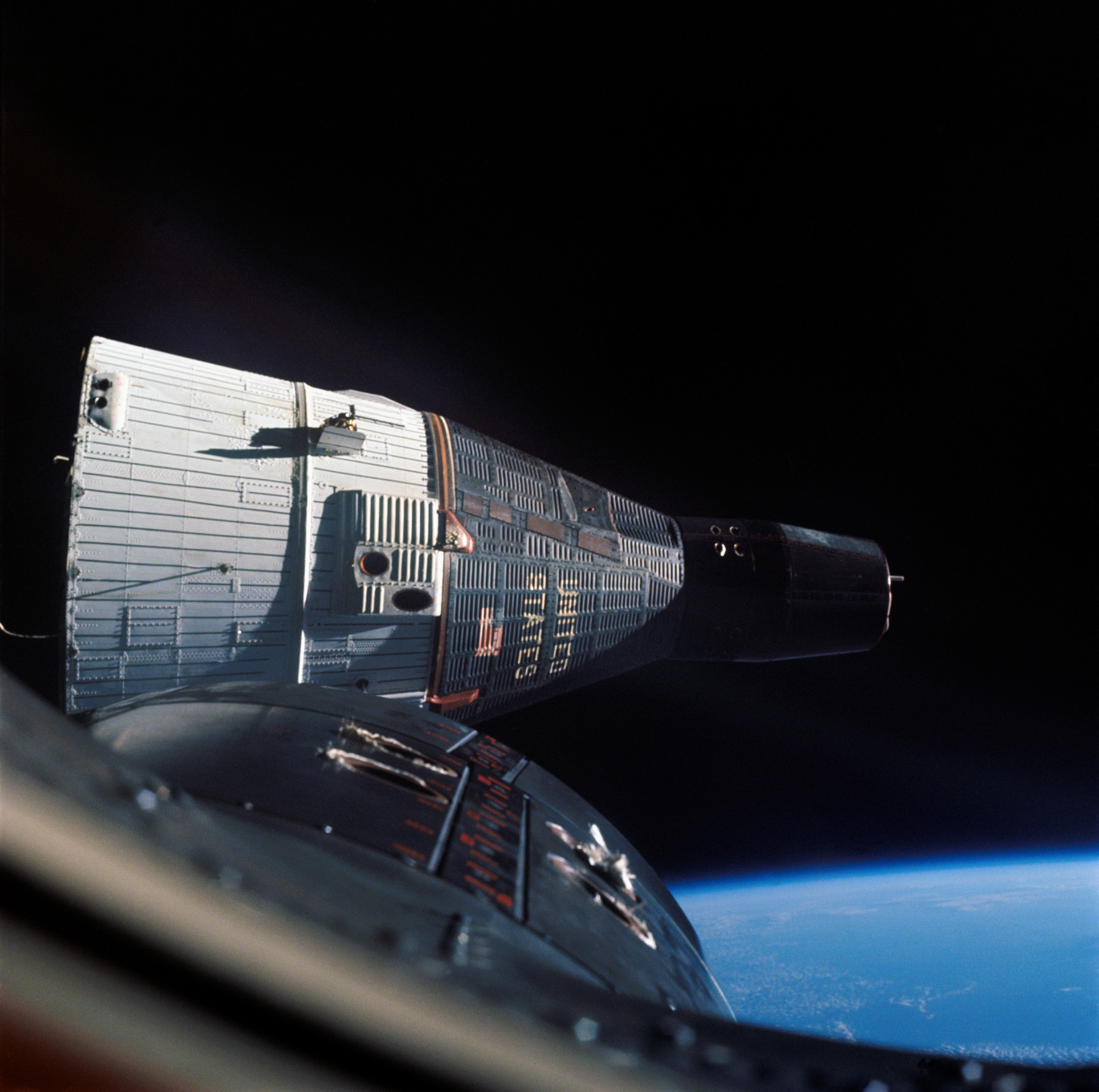
- Gemini VI-A (foreground) and Gemini VII make the first rendezvous in orbit between two crewed spacecraft
- Mission type: Space rendezvous
- Operator: NASA
- COSPAR ID: 1965-104A
- SATCAT no.: 1839
- Mission duration: 1 day, 1 hour, 51 minutes, 24 seconds
- Distance travelled: 694,415 kilometers (374,954 nautical miles)
- Orbits completed: 16

Spacecraft properties
- Spacecraft: Gemini SC6
- Manufacturer: McDonnell
- Launch mass: 3,546 kilograms (7,818 lb)

Crew
- Crew size: 2
- Members: Walter M. Schirra Jr.; Thomas P. Stafford

Start of mission
- Launch date: December 15, 1965, 13:37:26 UTC
- Rocket: Titan II GLV, s/n 62-12561
- Launch site: Cape Kennedy LC-19

End of mission
- Recovered by: USS Wasp
- Landing date: December 16, 1965, 15:28:50 UTC
- Landing site: North Atlantic Ocean; 23°35′N 67°50′W

Orbital parameters
- Reference system: Geocentric
- Regime: Low Earth orbit
- Perigee altitude: 270 kilometers (150 nautical miles)
- Apogee altitude: 274 kilometers (148 nautical miles)
- Inclination: 28.9 degrees
- Period: 89.95 minutes
- Epoch: December 15, 1965
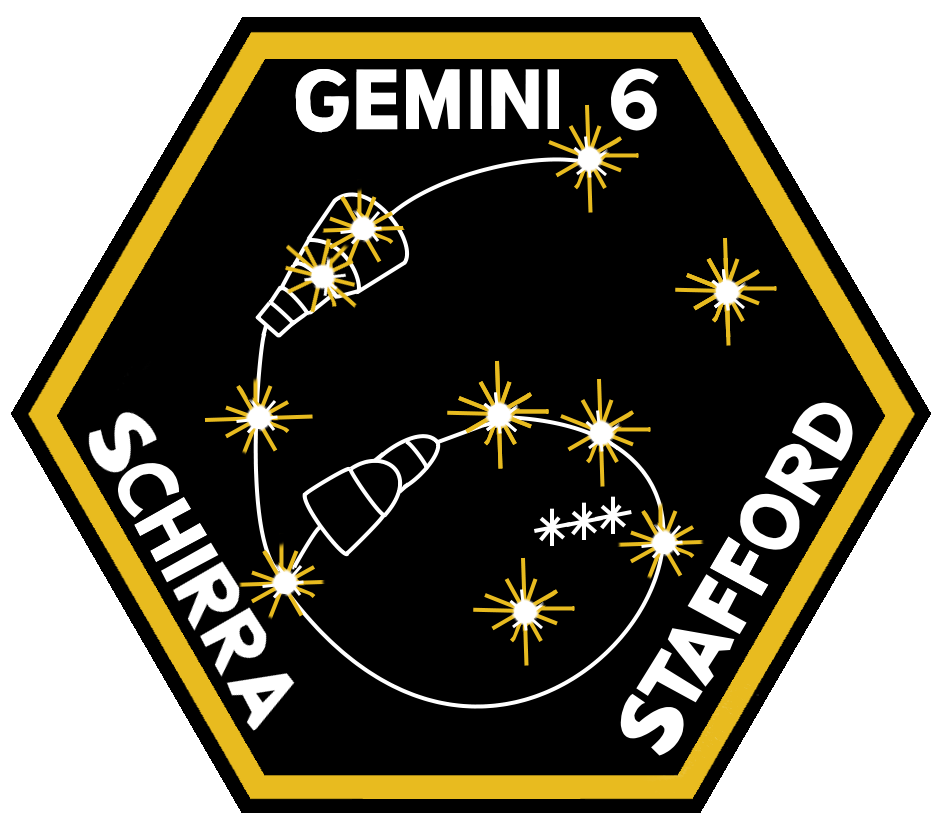
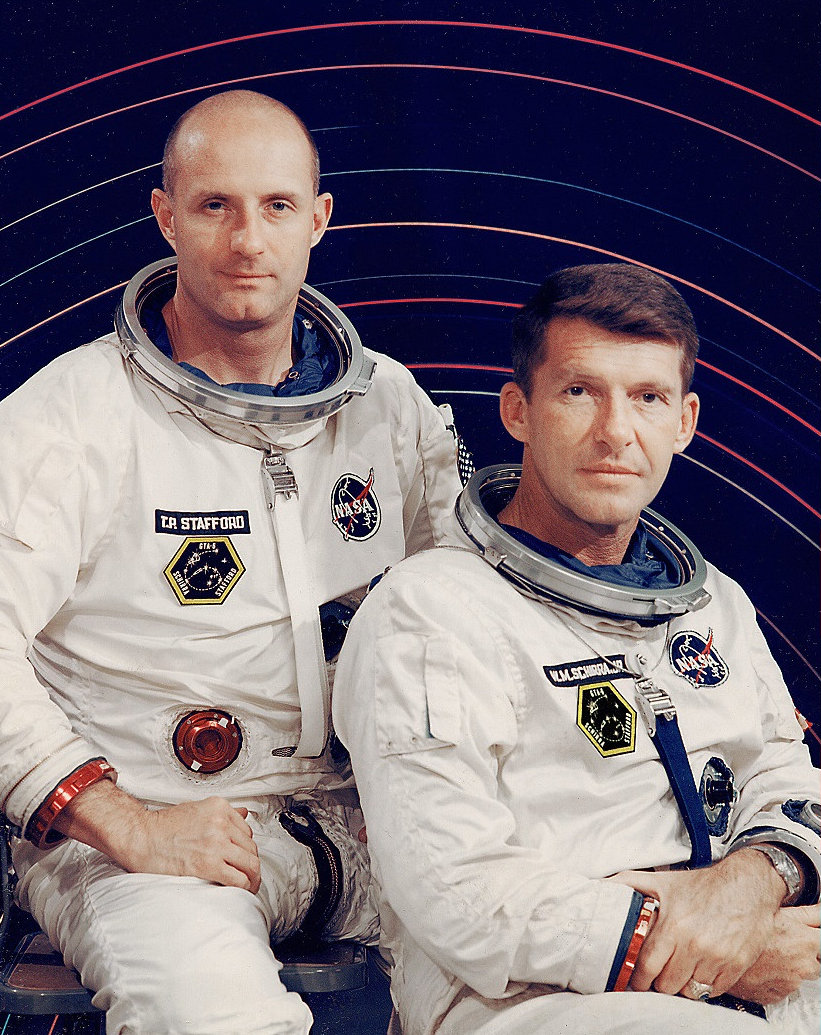
- (L-R) Stafford, Schirra Project Gemini

Gemini 6A (officially Gemini VI-A) was a 1965 crewed United States spaceflight in NASA's Gemini program. The mission, flown by Wally Schirra and Thomas P. Stafford, achieved the first crewed rendezvous with another spacecraft, its sister Gemini 7. Although the Soviet Union had twice previously launched simultaneous pairs of Vostok spacecraft, these established radio contact with each other, but they had no ability to adjust their orbits in order to rendezvous and came no closer than several kilometers of each other, while the Gemini 6 and 7 spacecraft came as close as one foot (30 cm) and could have docked had they been so equipped.

Gemini 6A was the fifth crewed Gemini flight, the 13th crewed American flight, and the 21st crewed spaceflight of all time (including two X-15 flights over 100 kilometers (54 nautical miles)).

== Crew ==
Position	Astronaut
Command Pilot	Walter M. Schirra Jr. Second spaceflight
Pilot	Thomas P. Stafford; First spaceflight

=== Backup crew ===
Position	Astronaut
Command Pilot	Virgil I. Grissom
Pilot	John W. Young
This was the prime crew of Gemini 3.

=== Support crew ===
- Charles A. Bassett II (Houston CAPCOM)
- Alan L. Bean (Cape CAPCOM)
- Eugene A. Cernan (Houston CAPCOM)
- Elliot M. See Jr. (Houston CAPCOM)

== Mission parameters ==
- Mass: 3,546 kilograms (7,818 lb)
- Perigee: 161 kilometers (100 miles)
- Apogee: 259.4 kilometers (161.2 miles)
- Inclination: 28.97°
- Period: 88.7 min

=== Stationkeeping with GT-7 ===
- Start: December 15, 1965 19:33 UTC
- End: December 16, 1965 00:52 UTC
- Duration: 5 hours, 19 minutes

== Objective ==
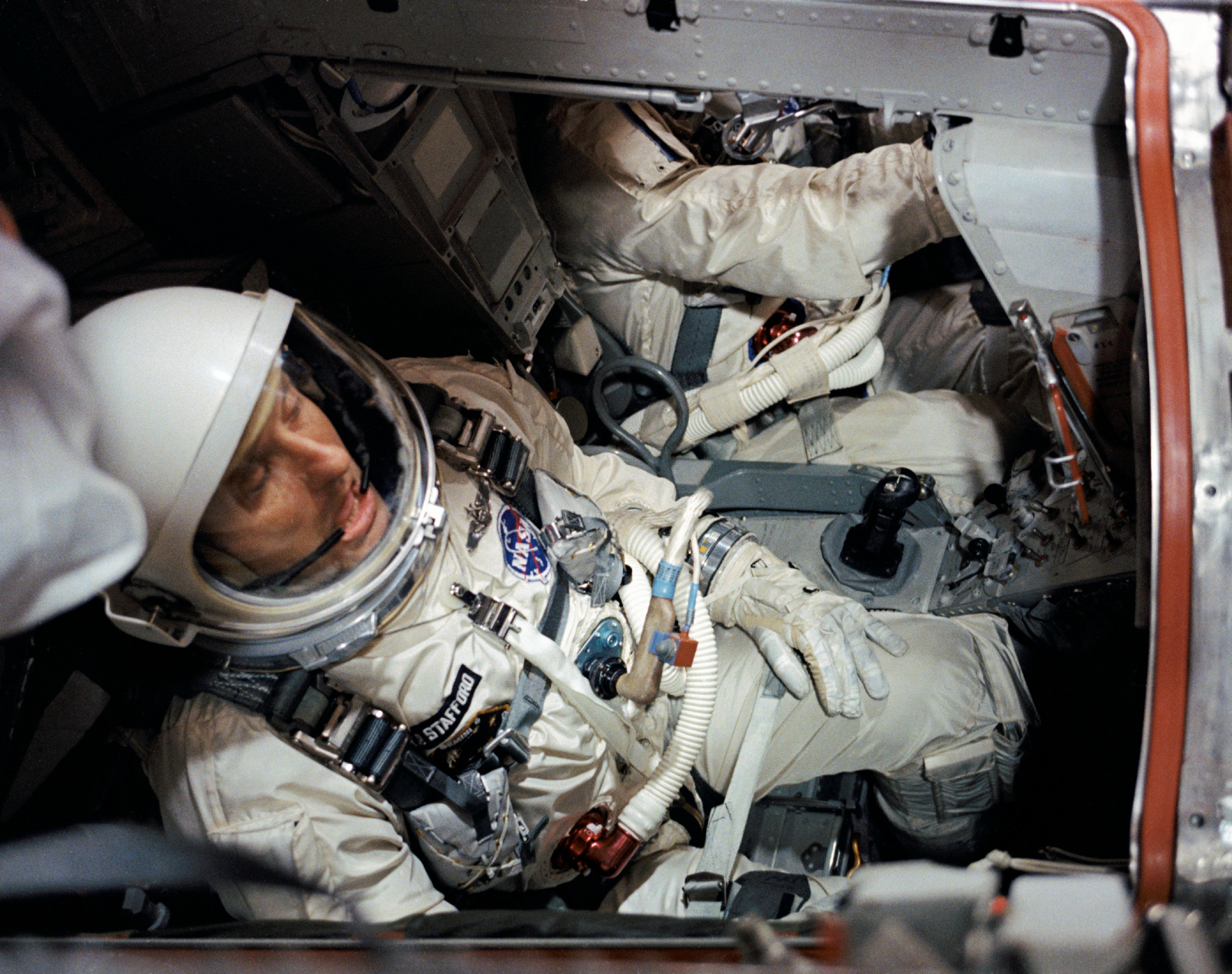
Stafford and Schirra before the pre-launch countdown

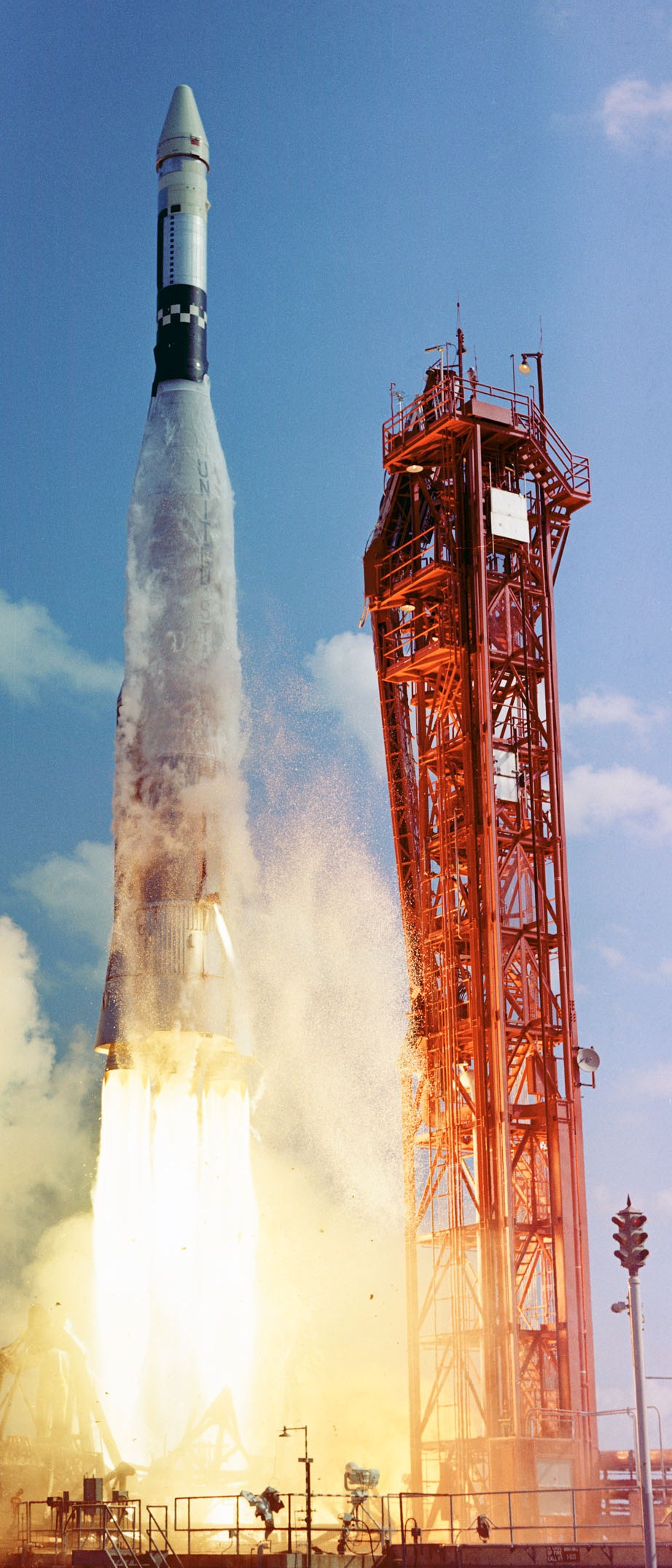
The Atlas-Agena launches the Agena Target Vehicle for the intended Gemini 6 rendezvous mission, attempted October 25, 1965 but fails.

The original Gemini 6 mission, scheduled for launch on October 25, 1965, at 11:41 am EDT, had a planned mission duration of 46 hours 47 minutes, completing a total of 29 orbits. It was to land in the western Atlantic Ocean south of Bermuda.

The mission was to include four dockings with the Agena Target Vehicle. The first docking was scheduled for five hours and forty minutes into the mission. The second was scheduled for seven hours and forty-five minutes, the third at nine hours and forty minutes, and the fourth and final docking at ten hours and five minutes into the mission. The final undocking would take place at 18 hours and 20 minutes into the mission. At 23 hours and 55 minutes into the mission, while the spacecraft passed over White Sands, New Mexico, the crew was to attempt to observe a laser beam originating from the ground. The retrorockets were scheduled to be fired at 46 hours and 10 minutes into the mission over the Pacific Ocean on the 29th orbit.

Original mission plans also included the first live television coverage of the recovery of a U.S. spacecraft at sea from the recovery ship, the U.S. aircraft carrier Wasp. The Wasp was fitted with ground station equipment by ITT to relay live television, via the Intelsat I (nicknamed the "Early Bird") satellite.

=== Original mission canceled ===
On October 25, 1965, Schirra and Stafford boarded their Gemini 6 craft to prepare for launch. Fifteen minutes later, the uncrewed Atlas-Agena target vehicle was launched. After a successful burn of the Atlas booster, the Agena's engine fired to separate it from the Atlas. But immediately after the Agena's engine fired at the six-minute mark in the flight, telemetry was lost. A catastrophic failure apparently caused the vehicle to explode, as Range Safety was tracking multiple pieces of debris falling into the Atlantic Ocean. After 50 minutes, the Gemini launch was canceled.

Gemini 6 Target Vehicle Info
Agena	GATV-5002
Mass	3,261 kilograms (7,189 lb), 7800 lbs.
Launch site	LC-14
Launch date	October 25, 1965
Launch time	15:00:04 UTC
Exploded	15:06:20 UTC

=== Revised mission ===
After reviewing the situation, NASA decided to launch an alternate Gemini 6A mission, eight days after the launch of Gemini 7, which was scheduled as a 14-day long-duration mission in December. Gemini 6A would perform the first rendezvous of two spacecraft in orbit, using Gemini 7 as the target, though they would not dock. The crews also discussed the possibility of Stafford performing an EVA from 6A to 7, swapping places with Gemini 7 pilot Jim Lovell, but the commander of Gemini 7, Frank Borman, objected, pointing out that it would require Lovell to wear an uncomfortable EVA suit on a long-duration mission.

== Flight ==
Attempt	Planned	Result	Turnaround	Reason	Decision point	Weather go (%)	Notes
1	25 Oct 1965, 11:41:00 am	Scrubbed	—	Technical	25 Oct 1965, 10:54 am		Failure of Atlas-Agena rocket to orbit. Mission plans revised and designated as Gemini 6A.
2	12 Dec 1965, 9:54:00 am	Scrubbed	47 days 22 hours 13 minutes	Technical	12 Dec 1965, 9:54 am (T+00:00:01)		Both engines shut down after ignition due to an electrical plug falling out.
3	15 Dec 1965, 8:37:26 am	Success	2 days 22 hours 43 minutes				

=== First launch attempt ===
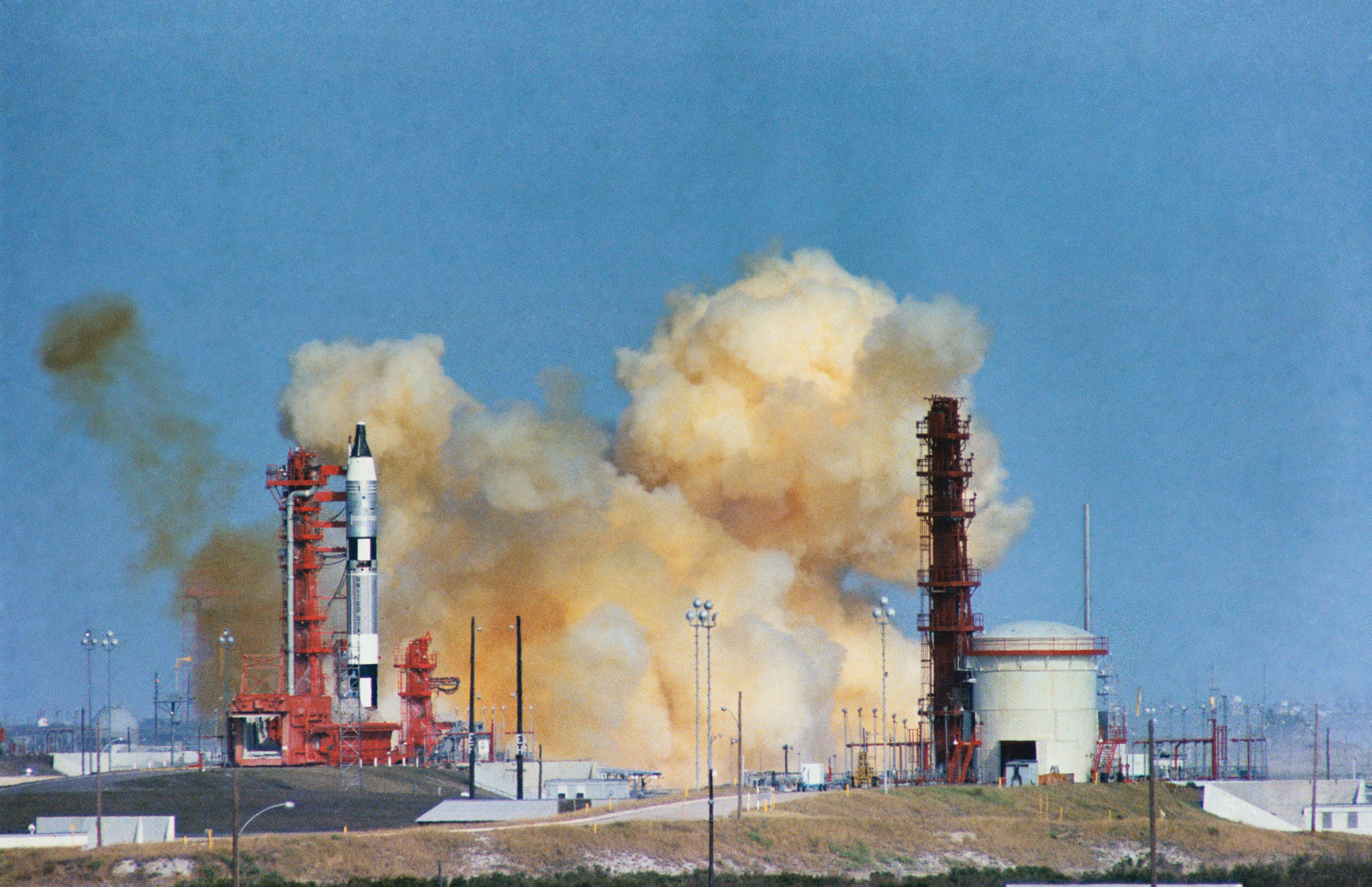
The launch abort of Gemini 6A, attempted December 12, 1965

The first attempt to launch the 6A mission (second attempt for Gemini spacecraft No. 6) was on December 12, 1965, at 9:54 a.m. EST. All went well right up to ignition; the engines ignited, but after about 1.5 seconds they abruptly shut down. Since the lift-off clock had started in the spacecraft, mission rules dictated that Wally Schirra, as the commander, had to immediately pull the D-ring between his knees and activate the ejection seats, carrying the astronauts away from the disaster that would be the result of a fully fueled Titan II falling back onto LC-19. However, Schirra did not feel any movement and knew that the booster had not lifted, so he decided not to abort. His quick thinking probably saved the mission as the reliability of the Gemini ejector seats was questionable; the astronauts could have been badly injured from high g-forces as the seats had to launch them at least 800 feet, which was deemed a safe distance from an exploding Titan II.

In addition, the cabin interior had been soaking in pure oxygen for hours. Tom Stafford, in a NASA oral history in 1997, later recalled:

So it turns out what we would have seen, had we had to do that, would have been two Roman candles going out, because we were 15 or 16 psi, pure oxygen, soaking in that for an hour and a half. You remember the tragic fire we had at the Cape. (...) Jesus, with that fire going off and that, it would have burned the suits. Everything was soaked in oxygen. So thank God. That was another thing: NASA never tested it under the conditions that they would have had if they would have had to eject. They did have some tests at China Lake where they had a simulated mock-up of Gemini capsule, but what they did is fill it full of nitrogen. They didn't have it filled full of oxygen in the sled test they had.

Even if the astronauts had not been injured or killed, ejection would ruin the spacecraft and delay the mission for months.

After the Stage I engines ignited and shut down, it still took about an hour for the booster to be made safe. The delay was due to the discovery of fuel (UDMH) leaking out of the PSV drain valve. The fuel had been ignited by the engine start, and the resulting fire was discovered when the Pad Crew inspected the engine compartment. Water spray was initiated and a cap was installed on the drain line.

After removing the propellant from the Titan II, the booster was checked out and it was found that the plug which sent the lift-off signal to the spacecraft had dropped out, causing the clock to start. Testing revealed that some plugs came out more easily than others, so they were replaced by different ones that would stay in place properly.

However, the electrical plug turned out to not be the only problem with the booster. Examination of telemetry also showed that the Titan actually began experiencing thrust decay before the plug dropped out. Engine No. 1 was unaffected and nearly reached 100% thrust at shutdown, while Engine No. 2 never transitioned to in-flight performance levels. Engineers spent all night combing through the first stage, but failed to find any cause for the thrust decay. Eventually however, one technician identified the problem, which was a plastic dust cover inside the gas generator that had been carelessly left inside when the booster was assembled months earlier at the Martin-Marietta plant, blocking the flow of oxidizer. The cover was removed and the Titan II cleared for another launch attempt.

Had the inadvertent electrical disconnect not occurred, the abort sensing system would have sent a shutoff command to the Titan at T+2.2 seconds due to the loss of Engine No. 2 chamber pressure. Since launcher release and liftoff would take place at T+3.2 seconds, a pad fallback still would not have occurred in this scenario and the astronauts would have been safe.

=== Second attempt and rendezvous ===
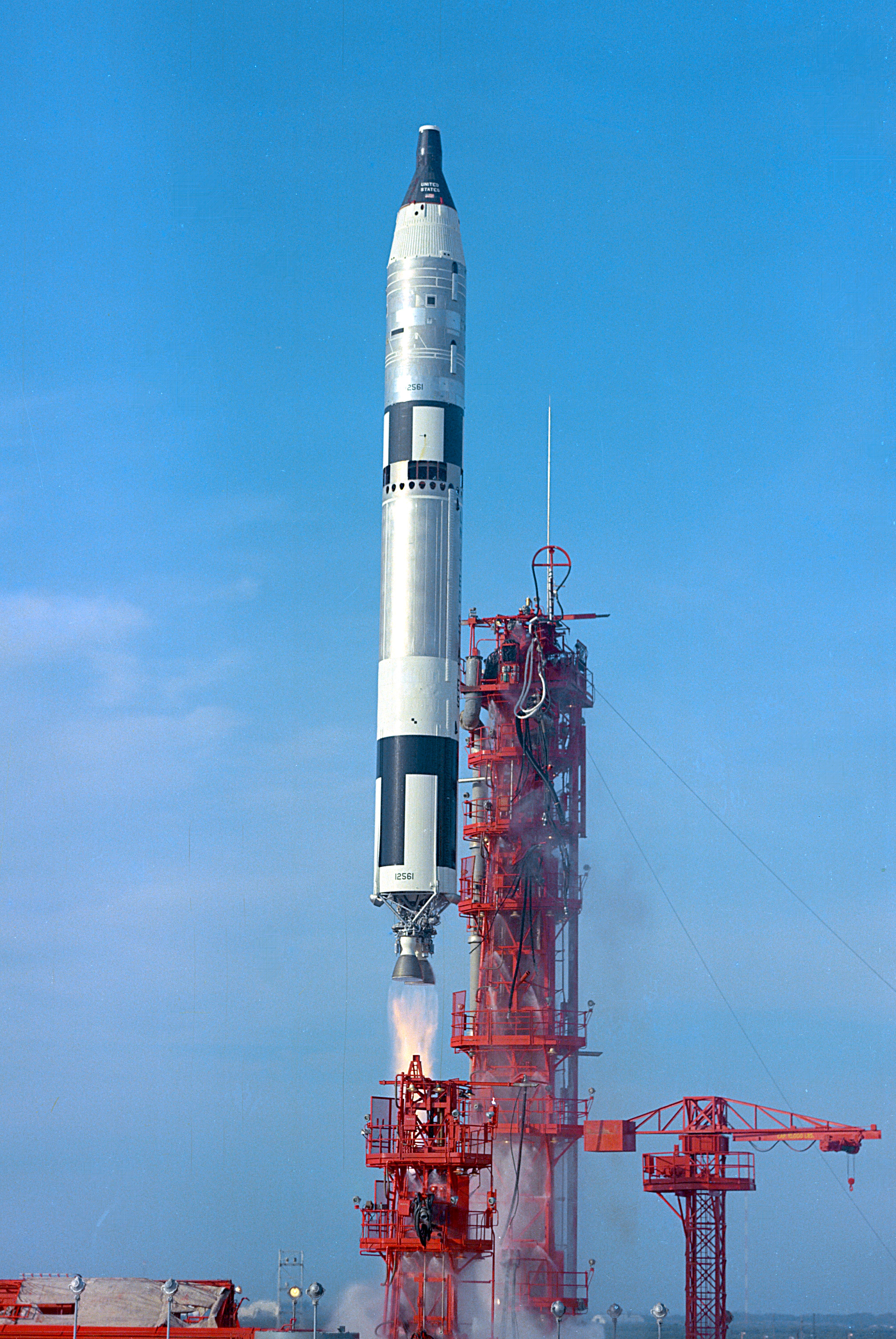
Launch of Gemini 6A from Pad 19, December 15, 1965.

The Titan's batteries were replaced and the fuel prevalves, which had opened, were removed and it was decided to launch without them. The second attempt to launch the 6A mission (third attempt for Gemini spacecraft No. 6) was successful on December 15 at 8:37:26 a.m. EST. All went well through launch and ascent; first stage cutoff occurred at T+160 seconds and second stage cutoff at T+341 seconds. Spacecraft separation occurred at T+361 seconds and the crew entered a 100-by-161-mile (161 by 259 km) orbit.

The plan called for the rendezvous to take place on the fourth orbit of Gemini 6. Their first burn came 94 minutes after launch when they increased their speed by 5 meters (16 1/2 feet) per second. Due to their lower orbit they were gaining on Gemini 7 and were only 730 miles, (or 1,175 kilometers), behind. The next burn was at two hours and eighteen minutes when Gemini 6A made a phase adjustment to put them on the same orbital inclination as Gemini 7. They now only trailed by 300 miles (483 km).

The radar on Gemini 6A first made contact with Gemini 7 at three hours and fifteen minutes when they were 434 kilometers (270 mi) away. A third burn put them into a 168-by-170-mile (270 by 274 km) orbit. As they slowly gained, Schirra put Gemini 6A's computer in charge of the rendezvous. At five hours and four minutes, he saw a bright star that he thought was Sirius, but this was in fact Gemini 7.

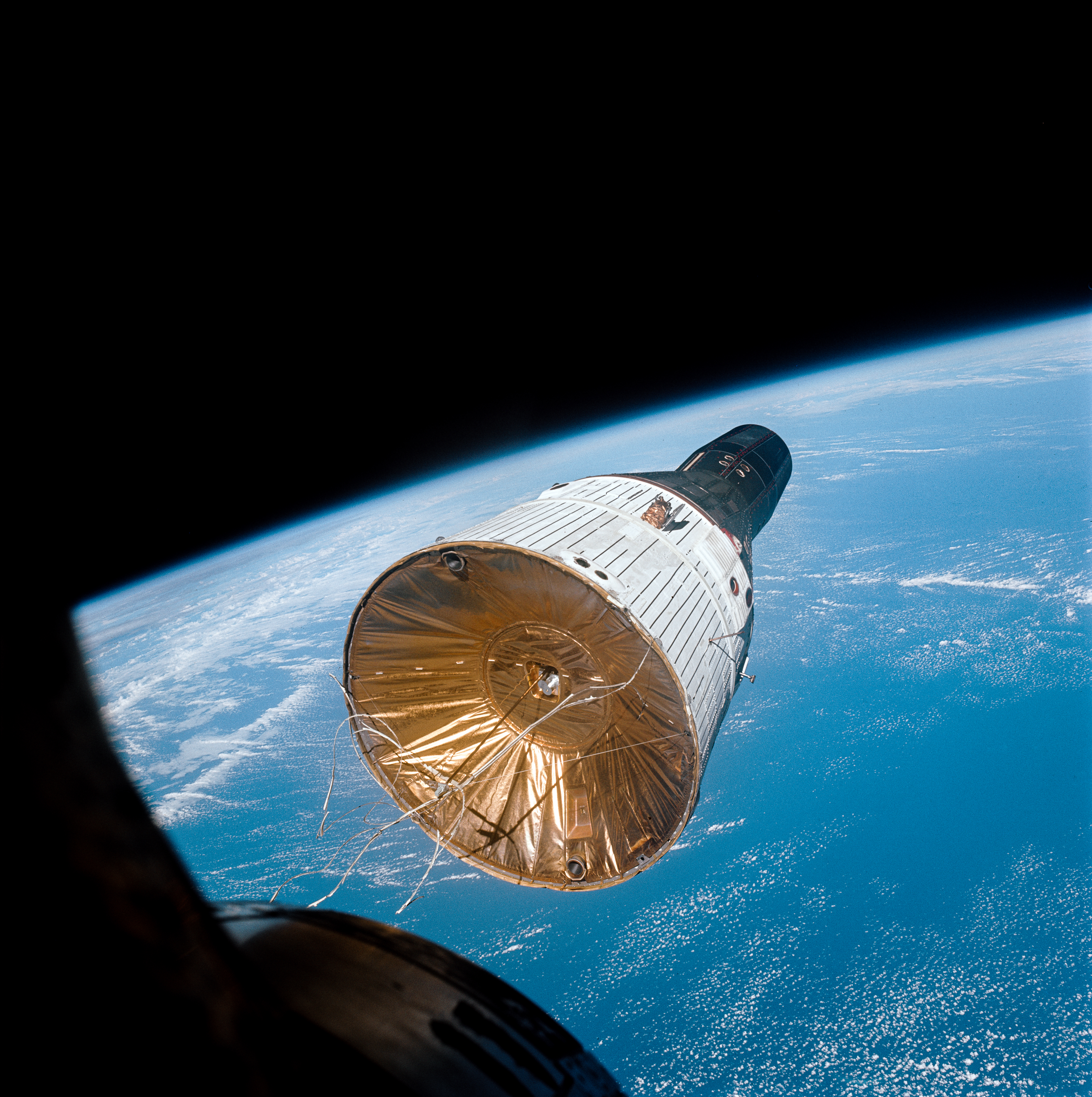
The crew of Gemini 6A took this photo of Gemini 7 when they were about 7 meters apart

After several more burns, the two spacecraft were only 130 feet (40 meters) apart. The burns had only used 112 lbs. (51 kilograms) of propellant on Gemini 6A, leaving plenty for some fly-arounds. During the next 270 minutes, the crews moved as close as one foot (30 centimeters), talking over the radio. At one stage the spacecraft were stationkeeping so well that neither crew had to make any burns for 20 minutes.

Schirra said that because there is no turbulence in space, "I was amazed at my ability to maneuver. I did a fly-around inspection of Gemini 7, literally flying rings around it, and I could move to within inches of it in perfect confidence". As the crew sleep periods approached, Gemini 6A made a separation burn and slowly drifted more than 30 kilometers (19 mi) from Gemini 7. This ensured that there would not be any accidental collisions while the astronauts slept.

=== A Christmas surprise ===
The next day, before reentry, the crew of Gemini 6A had a surprise:

...this is Gemini VI. We have an object, looks like a satellite going from north to south, up in a polar orbit. He's in a very low trajectory traveling from north to south and has a very high climbing ratio. It looks like it might even be a ... Very low. Looks like he might be going to reenter soon. Stand by one ... You might just let me try to pick up that thing.

Radio transmission
Between Gemini VI, Gemini VII and Mission Control in Houston, December 16, 1965

At that point, the sound of "Jingle Bells" was heard played on an eight-note Hohner "Little Lady" harmonica and a handful of small bells. The Smithsonian Institution claims these were the first musical instruments played in space and keeps the instruments on display.

=== Reentry ===
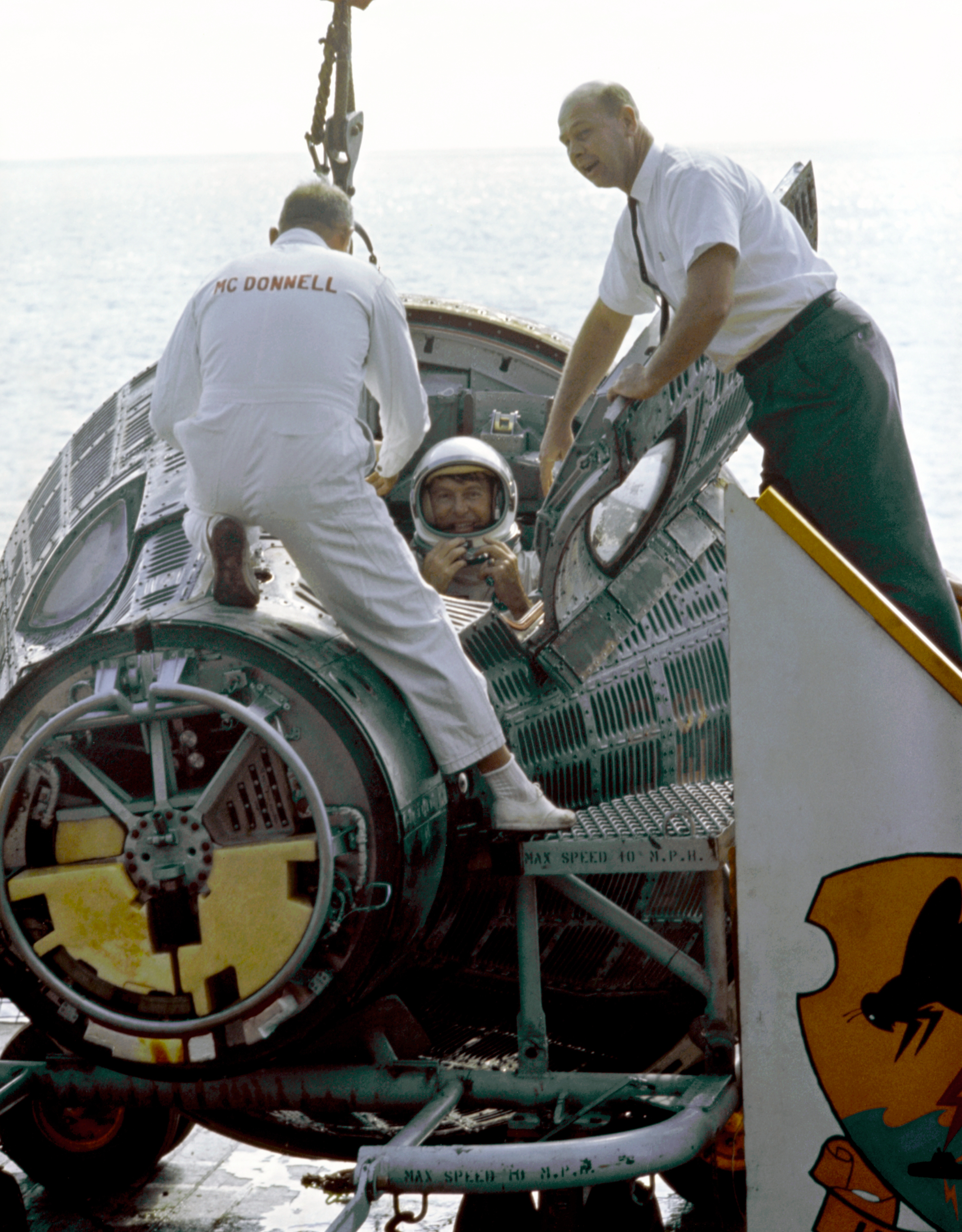
Schirra prepares to climb out of the capsule, on deck of the recovery ship

Gemini 6A fired its retro-rockets and landed within 18 kilometers (11 miles) of the planned site in the Atlantic Ocean northeast of Turks and Caicos. It was the first recovery to be televised live, through a transportable satellite earth station developed by ITT on the deck of the recovery aircraft carrier USS Wasp.

The Gemini 7 and 6A missions were supported by the following U.S. Department of Defense resources: 10,125 personnel, 125 aircraft and 16 ships.

== Insignia ==
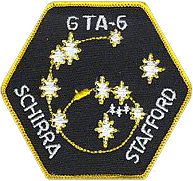
Original mission patch, showing the designation GTA-6

Walter Schirra explained the patch in the book All We Did Was Fly to the Moon:

The Gemini 6 patch is hexagonal in shape, reflecting the mission number; and the spacecraft trajectory also traces out the number "6". The Gemini 6 spacecraft is shown superimposed on the "twin stars" Castor and Pollux, for "Gemini". I designed the patch to locate in the sixth hour of celestial right ascension. This was the predicted celestial area where the rendezvous should occur (in the constellation Orion). It finally did occur there.

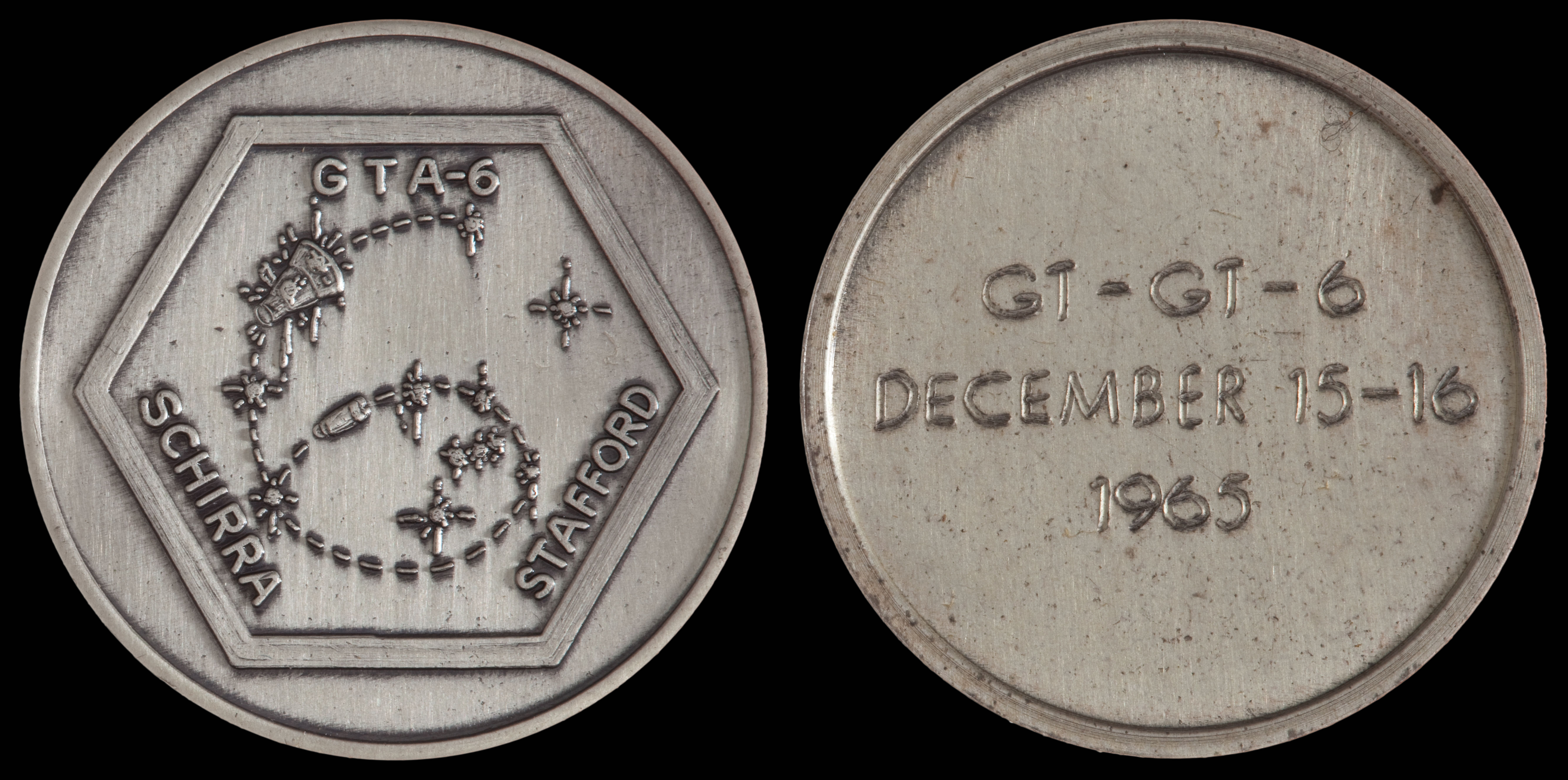
Gemini 6A space-flown Fliteline Medallion

The original patch had called the flight GTA-6 (for Gemini-Titan-Agena) and showed the Gemini craft chasing an Agena. It was changed when the mission was altered to depict two Gemini spacecraft.

== Spacecraft location ==
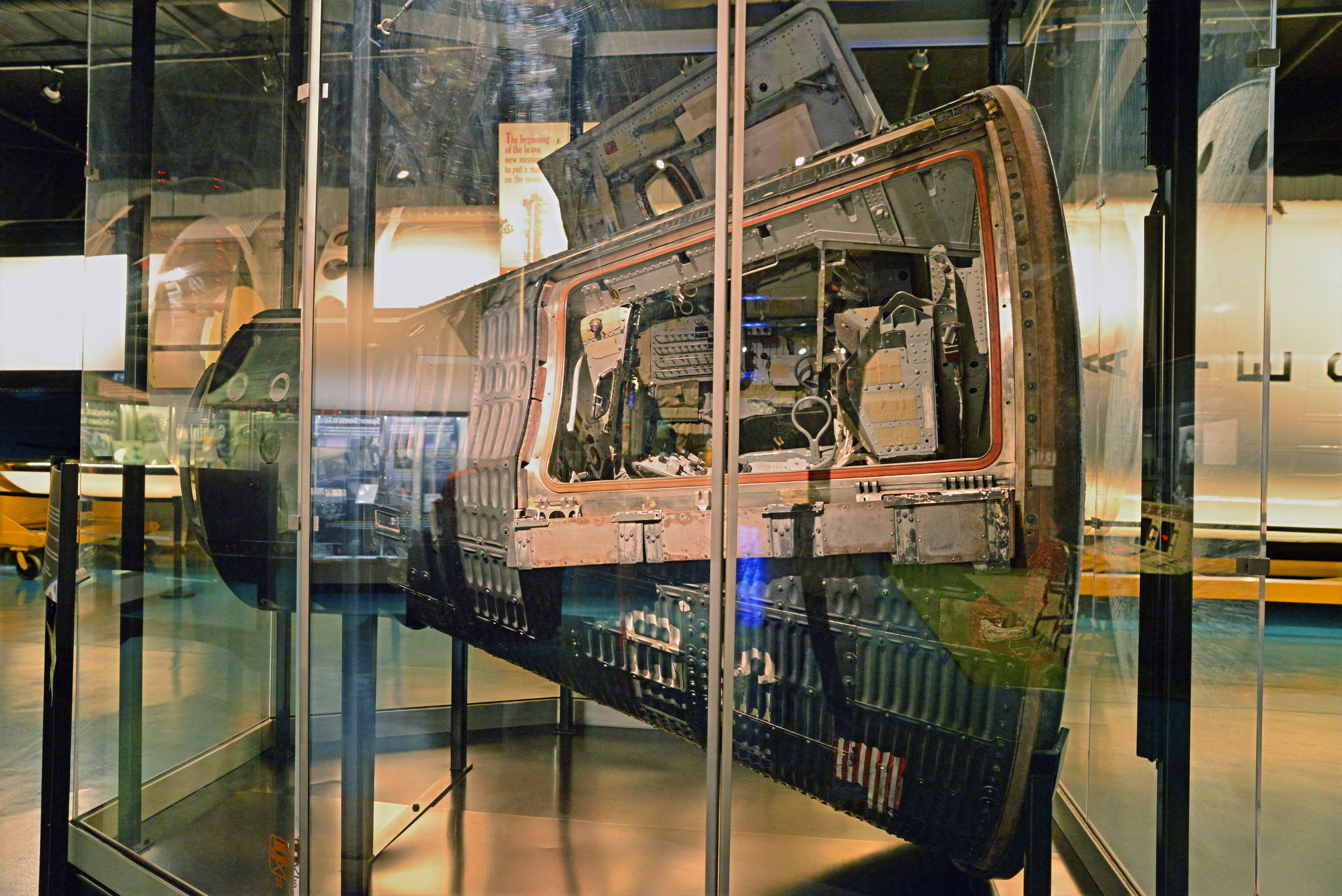
Gemini 6A at the Stafford Air & Space Museum

The spacecraft is currently on display at the Stafford Air & Space Museum in Weatherford, Oklahoma, having previously been displayed at the Oklahoma History Center in Oklahoma City. The spacecraft had previously been on display at the Omniplex Science Museum elsewhere in the city. It is on a long-term loan from the Smithsonian Institution.

Before being moved to Oklahoma, the spacecraft was displayed at the St. Louis Science Center in St. Louis, Missouri.

== See also ==
- Splashdown (spacecraft landing)
