= List of Apollo astronauts =

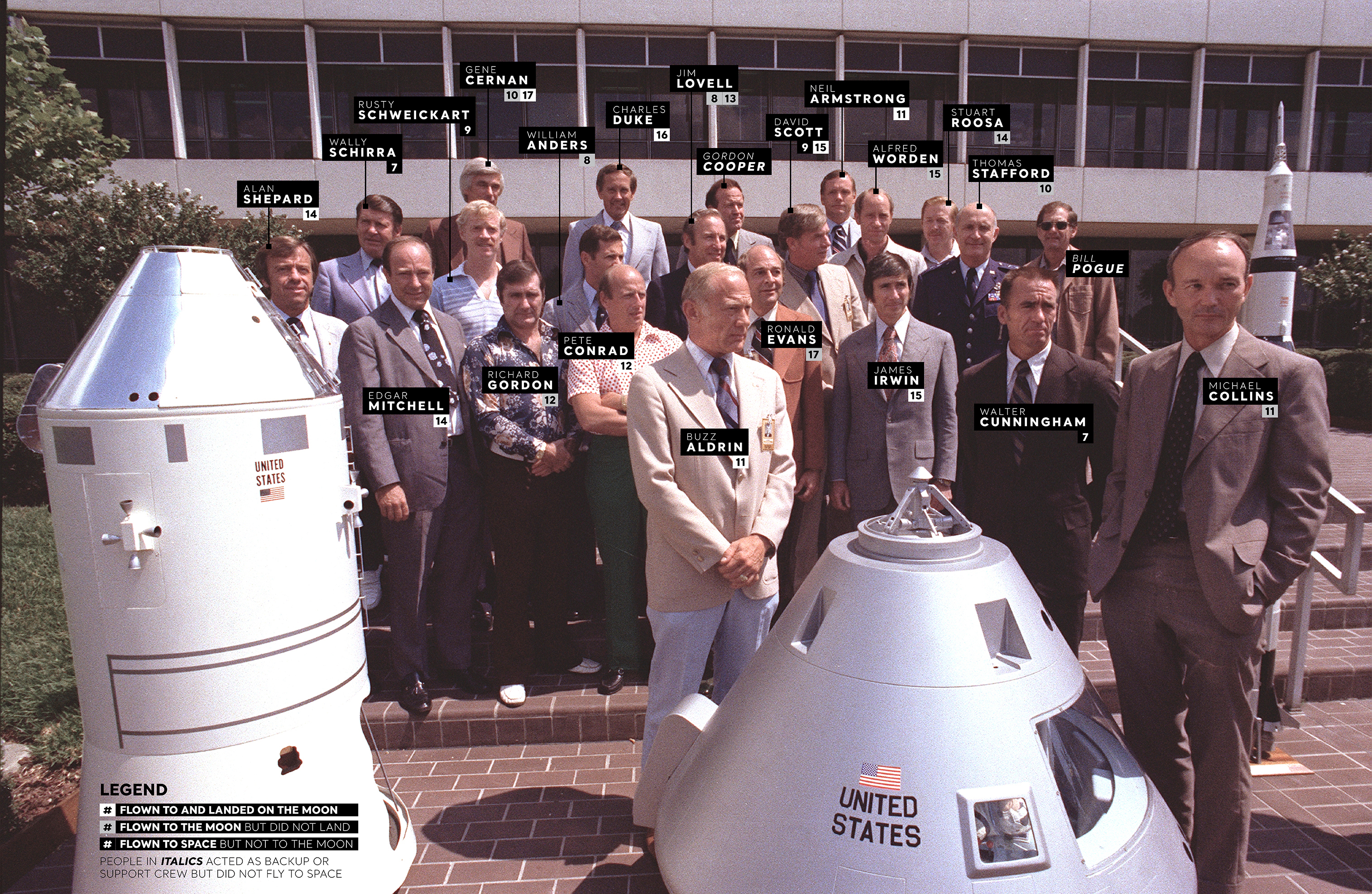
Most of the Apollo astronauts gathered at the Johnson Space Center in Houston in 1978

As part of the Apollo program by NASA, 24 astronauts flew nine lunar missions between December 1968 and December 1972. During six successful two-man landing missions, twelve men walked on the lunar surface, six of whom drove Lunar Roving Vehicles as part of the last three missions. Three men have reached the Moon twice, one on both an orbital mission and a circumlunar flight, while the other two landed once apiece after previous orbital missions. As of August 2025, five of the 24 remain alive.

Apart from these 24 men and the three men and one woman on the Artemis II lunar flyby in 2026, no human has gone beyond low Earth orbit. Several non-human animals have circled or orbited the Moon, including two tortoises, several turtles, and five mice.

Apollo 8 and 10 to 17 were the nine crewed Apollo lunar missions. Apollo 4–6 and AS-201 and AS-202 were uncrewed, while AS-203 is considered a test flight. The Apollo program included three other crewed missions: Apollo 1 (AS-204) did not launch and its crew died in a ground-based capsule fire, while Apollo 7 and Apollo 9 were low Earth orbit missions that tested spacecraft components and docking maneuvers. Apollo missions 18, 19, and 20 were canceled. Twelve astronauts later flew unused Apollo command modules in the Apollo Applications Program's Skylab and Apollo–Soyuz Test Project. Of the 24 astronauts who reached the Moon, two went on to command a Skylab mission, one commanded Apollo–Soyuz, one flew as commander for Approach and Landing Tests of the Space Shuttle, and two commanded orbital Space Shuttle missions.

== Prime crew members ==
NASA's Director of Flight Crew Operations during the Gemini and Apollo programs was Donald K. "Deke" Slayton, one of the original Mercury Seven astronauts, who was medically grounded in September 1962 due to a minor cardiac arrhythmia: paroxysmal atrial fibrillation. Slayton was responsible for making all Gemini and Apollo crew assignments. In March 1972, Slayton was restored to flight status, and flew on the 1975 Apollo–Soyuz Test Project mission.

The prime crew members selected for actual missions are here grouped by their NASA astronaut selection groups, and within each group in the order selected for flight. Two versions of the Apollo Command/Service Module (CSM) spacecraft were developed: Block I, intended for preliminary low Earth orbit testing; and Block II, redesigned for the lunar landing. The Block I crew position titles were command pilot, senior pilot (second seat), and pilot (third seat). The corresponding Block II titles were: commander, command module pilot, and lunar module pilot. The second seat pilot was given secondary responsibility for celestial navigation to keep the CSM's guidance computer accurately calibrated with the spacecraft's true position, and the third seat pilot served as a flight engineer, monitoring the health of the spacecraft systems.

== Apollo astronauts by their dates of selection by NASA ==
=== 1959 ===
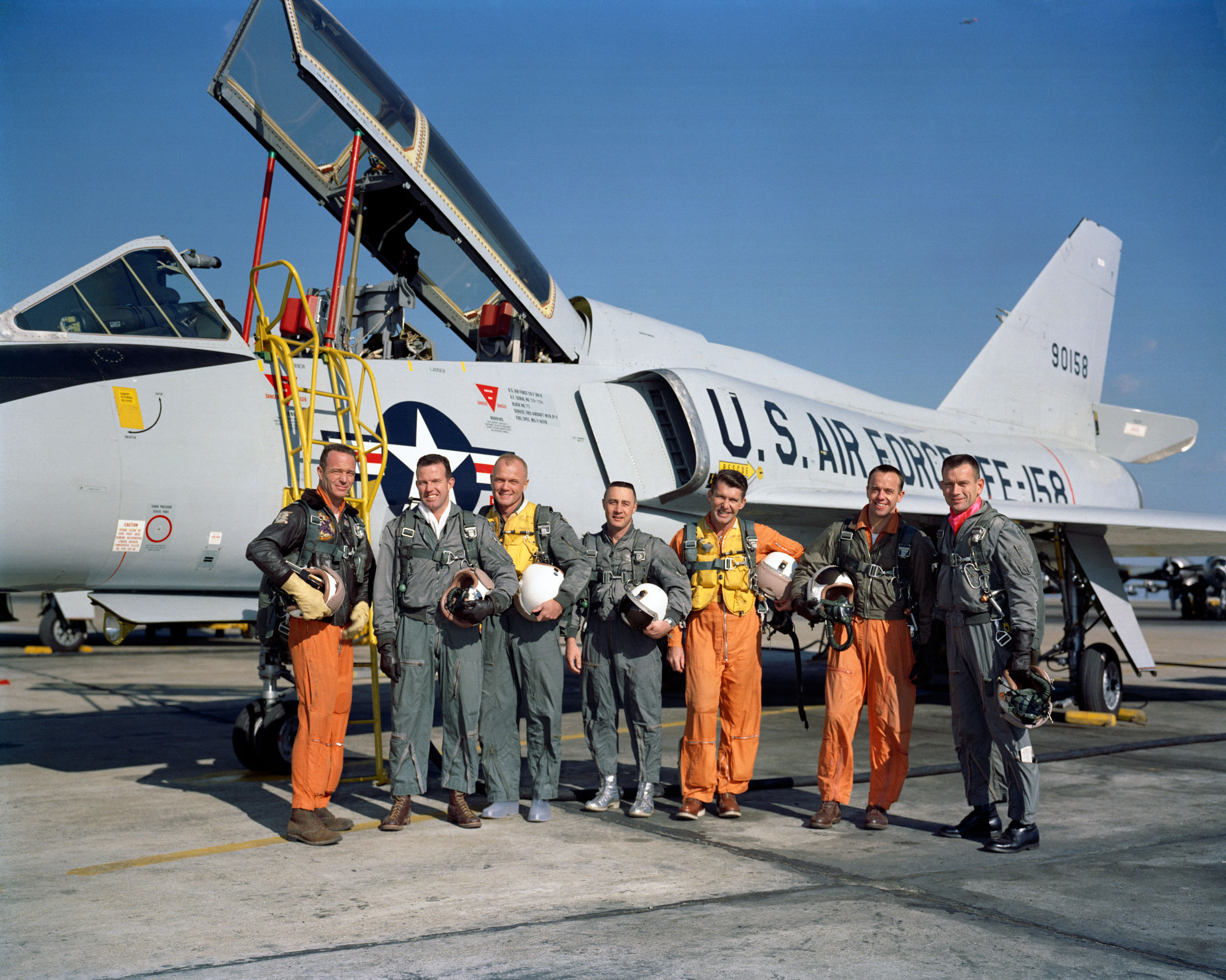
Mercury Seven astronauts (L to R): Scott Carpenter, Gordon Cooper, John Glenn, Grissom, Schirra, Shepard, and Slayton

- Virgil I. "Gus" Grissom began his career at NASA in 1959. In 1966, he was selected as command pilot for the first crewed Apollo mission, a low Earth orbit test. This mission ended a month before its scheduled launch, when a cabin fire on the launch pad killed Grissom, Ed White and Roger Chaffee on January 27, 1967.
- Walter M. Schirra Jr. also began his NASA career in 1959. He was selected in October 1968 as command pilot for Apollo 7, an 11-day, low Earth orbit shakedown test of the three-man Apollo Command/Service Module and the first crewed launch for the Apollo project.
- Alan B. Shepard Jr.: America's first man in space on Freedom 7 was originally selected to command Gemini 3, but was medically grounded for the duration of Gemini due to Ménière's disease and assisted Slayton in flight operations. After corrective surgery, Shepard was restored to flight status and commanded Apollo 14, the third successful Moon landing mission.

=== 1962 ===
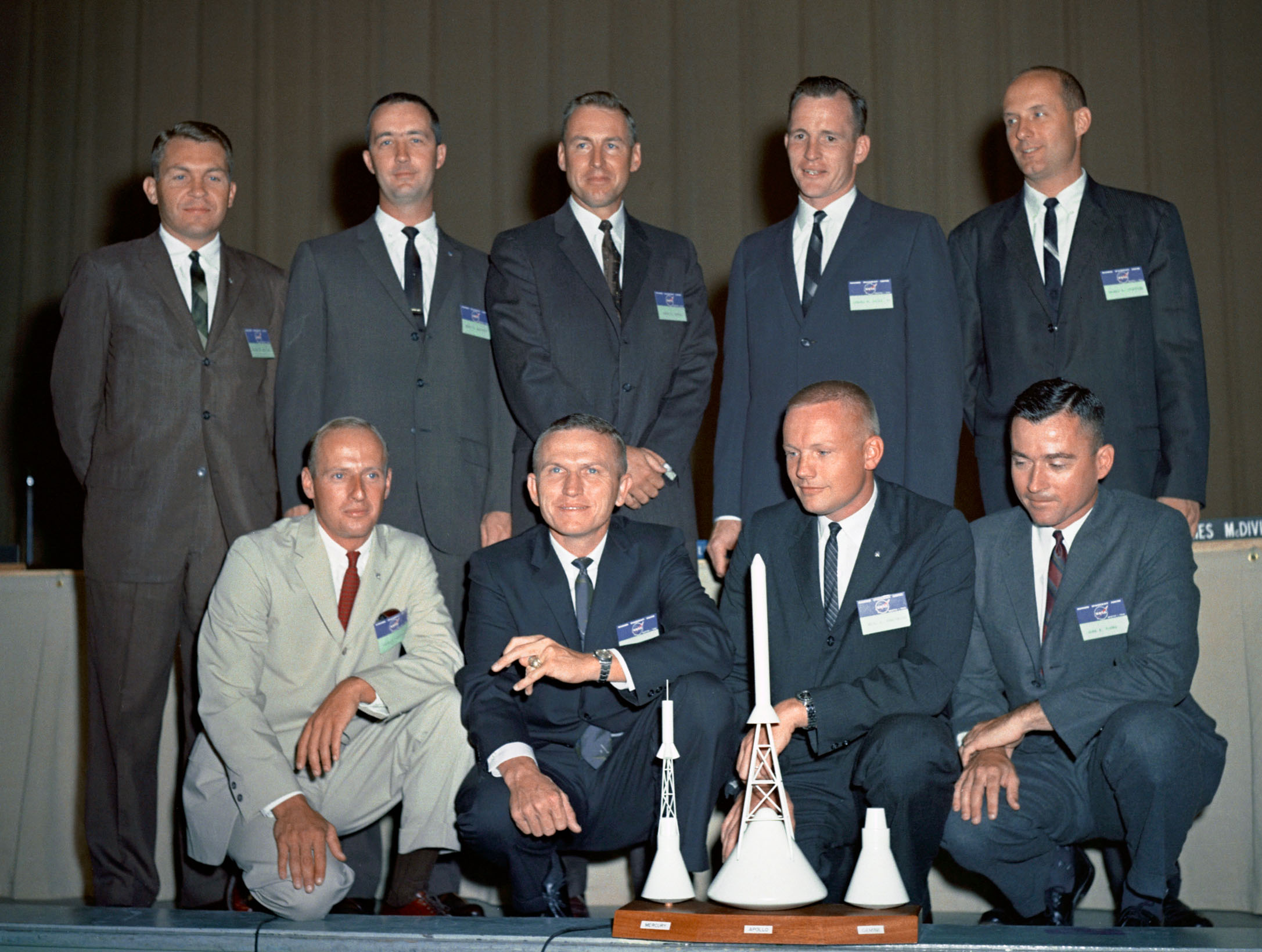
NASA Astronaut Group 2. Back row: Elliot M. See (died in Gemini training), McDivitt, Lovell, White, Stafford. Front row: Conrad, Borman, Armstrong, Young

All of these astronauts flew on Gemini, and except for White, each commanded one Gemini and one Apollo mission:

- Edward H. White II: second-seat veteran of Gemini 4 who made the United States' first walk in space; he was selected as senior pilot (second seat) on Apollo 1. White was killed in the Apollo 1 fire along with Grissom and Chaffee.
- James A. McDivitt: commander of Gemini 4; he was selected in late 1966 to command the first Earth orbital flight test of the Apollo Lunar Module with the CSM. This mission flew in March 1969 as Apollo 9. After his flight, McDivitt was promoted to Manager of Lunar Landing Operations, and in August 1969 was promoted to Manager of the Apollo Spacecraft Program.
- Frank F. Borman II: commander of Gemini 7; he was selected to command a higher Earth orbit test of the complete Apollo spacecraft, but when delays prevented the LM from being ready in time for its first flight in December 1968, Borman's mission was changed to the first lunar orbital flight of the CSM on Apollo 8.
- James A. Lovell Jr.: second-seat veteran of Gemini 7, and commander of Gemini 12; he flew as command module pilot (second seat) on Apollo 8. Lovell became the first to fly a second Apollo mission as commander of Apollo 13, the third lunar landing attempt. This mission was unsuccessful, due to a service module electrical system failure caused by an oxygen tank explosion. Lovell and his crew managed to return to Earth safely. Lovell is the only person to fly to the Moon's vicinity twice without landing there.
- Thomas P. Stafford: second-seat veteran of Gemini 6A and commander of Gemini 9A; he commanded a lunar orbital test of the Lunar Module on Apollo 10. He also commanded the Apollo–Soyuz Test Project mission.
- John W. Young: second-seat veteran of Gemini 3 and commander of Gemini 10; he flew as command module pilot on Apollo 10. Young later commanded the successful Apollo 16 lunar landing. He also commanded the first Space Shuttle flight, STS-1 Columbia, from April 12 to 14, 1981, and STS-9, also on Columbia, from November 28 to December 8, 1983.
- Neil A. Armstrong: commander of Gemini 8; he commanded Apollo 11, becoming the first human to set foot on the Moon.
- Charles "Pete" Conrad Jr.: second-seat veteran of Gemini 5 and commander of Gemini 11, as well as commanding Apollo 12, the second lunar landing. He went on to command Skylab 2, successfully completing repairs to the spacecraft that saved it for this and two subsequent missions.

=== 1963 ===
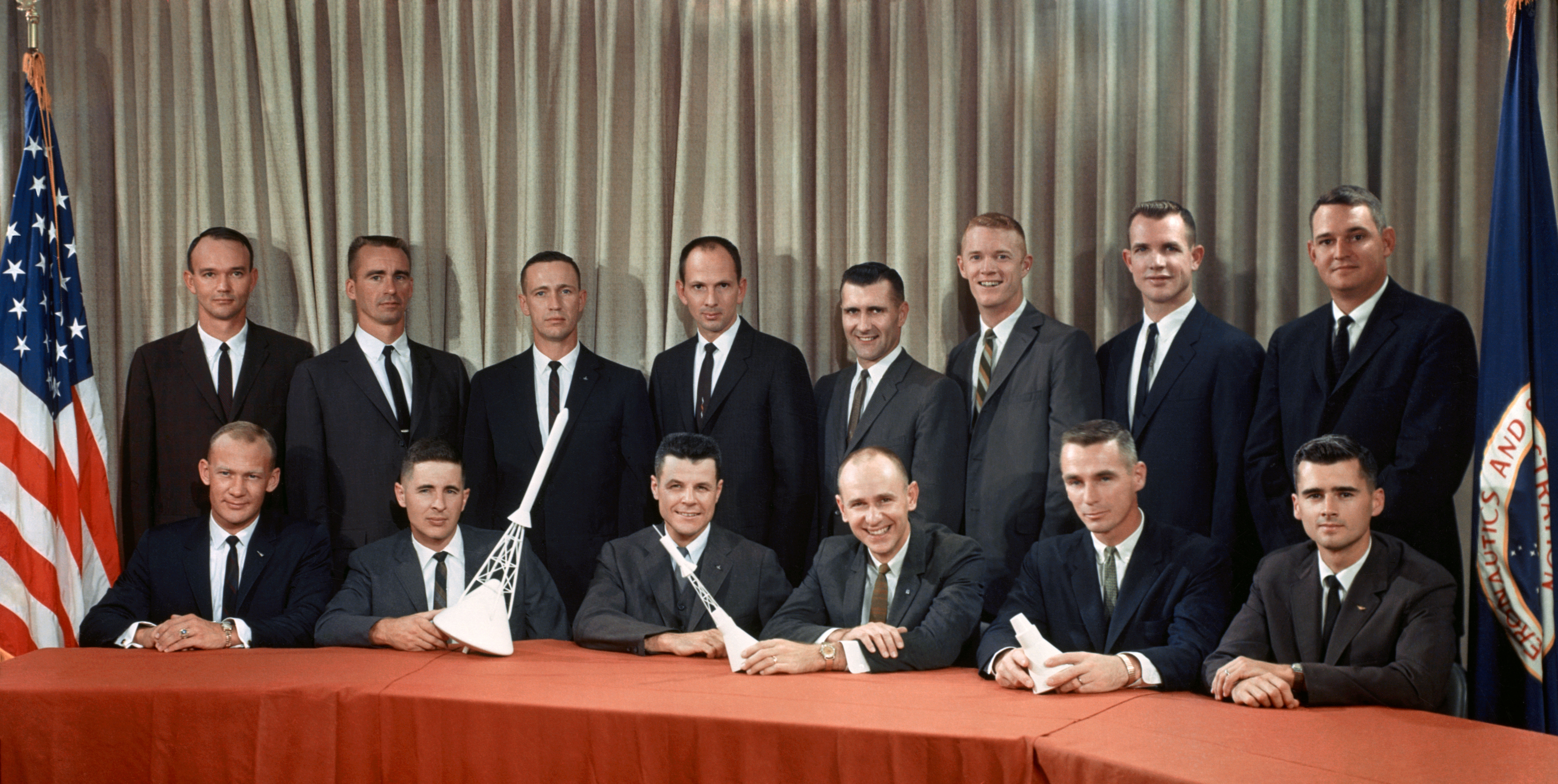
NASA Astronaut Group 3

This was the first class of astronauts for which test pilot experience was not required, but military jet fighter pilot experience was acceptable.

Five of this group got their first spaceflight experience as second seat on Gemini:

- David R. Scott: second-seat veteran of Gemini 8; he flew as command module pilot on Apollo 9, and commanded the Apollo 15 lunar landing.
- Eugene A. Cernan: second-seat veteran on Gemini 9A; he flew as lunar module pilot on Apollo 10, and commanded the final lunar landing mission Apollo 17.
- Michael Collins: second-seat veteran on Gemini 10; he flew as command module pilot on Apollo 11.
- Edwin E. "Buzz" Aldrin Jr.: second-seat veteran on Gemini 12; he flew as lunar module pilot on Apollo 11, the first Moon landing.
- Richard F. Gordon Jr.: second-seat veteran on Gemini 11; he flew as command module pilot on Apollo 12. Gordon was selected to command the Apollo 18 lunar landing, which was later canceled.

The remaining six members of this group were selected for their first space flights on Apollo:

- Roger B. Chaffee: selected as pilot (third seat) on Apollo 1, was killed with Grissom and White in the fire.
- Donn F. Eisele: flew second seat on Apollo 7.
- R. Walter Cunningham: flew third seat on Apollo 7.
- Russell L. "Rusty" Schweickart: flew as lunar module pilot on Apollo 9. Schweickart performed an EVA outside the spacecraft, testing the portable life support system used on the Moon.
- William A. Anders: flew third seat on Apollo 8.
- Alan L. Bean: flew as lunar module pilot on Apollo 12. He later served as commander for Skylab 3.

=== 1965 ===
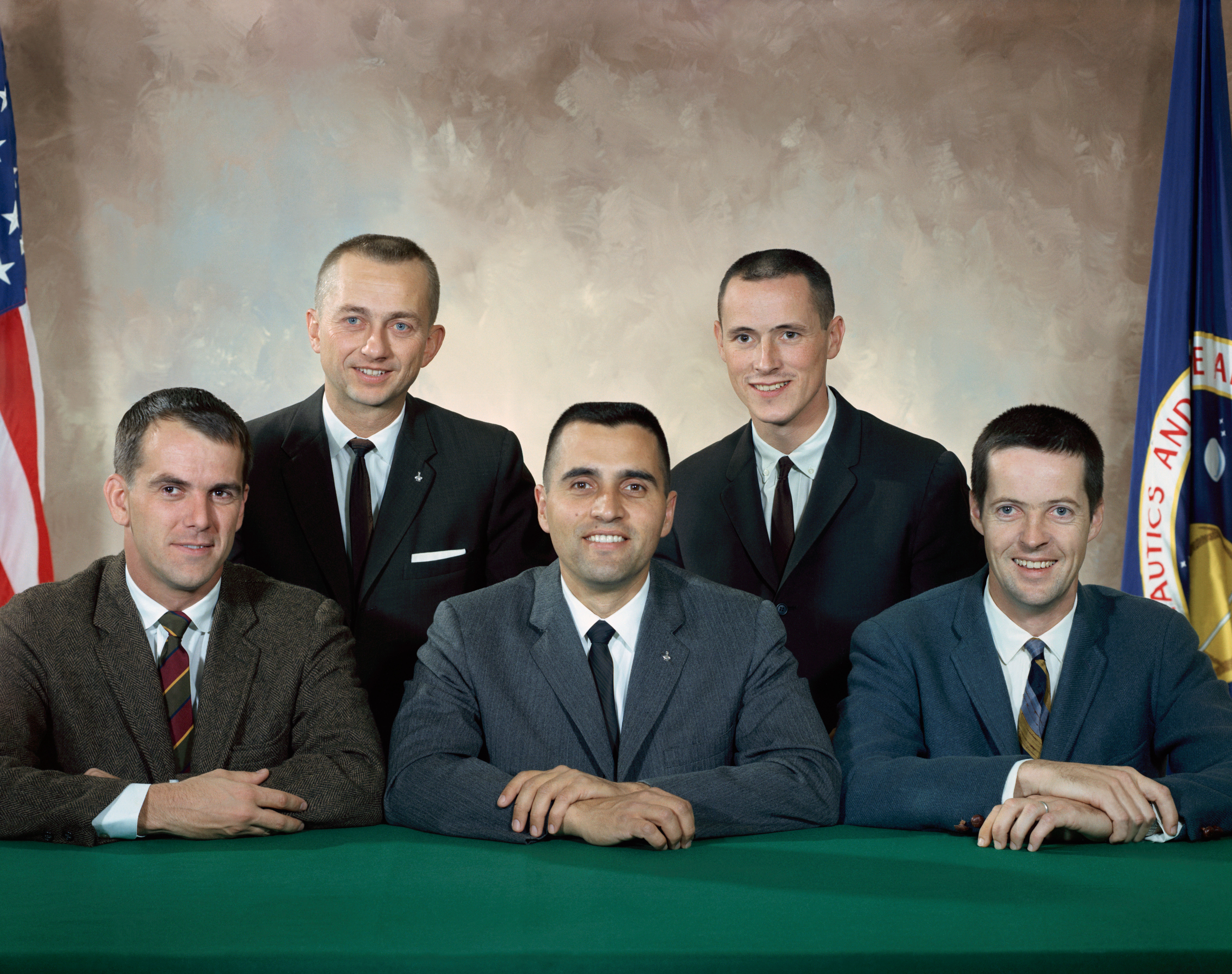
Group 4: the scientist astronaut group. Harrison Schmitt (center), who became NASA's first scientist astronaut to fly in space, explored the Moon on Apollo 17.

In June 1965, NASA named a group of five scientist astronauts, the first group qualified by doctorate degrees rather than test or military fighter pilot experience. (Note: Note: Edwin Aldrin and Eugene Cernan were selected for Group 3 without having been test pilots, though both were fighter pilots in the Air Force and Navy respectively.) Geologist Harrison H. "Jack" Schmitt participated heavily in the geological training of the lunar landing astronauts, as well as assisting in the analysis of returned samples and the preparation of mission reports. In 1970, he was selected as Lunar Module pilot for the Apollo 15 backup crew, and prime crew on Apollo 18. When program cutbacks canceled missions 18 through 20, NASA's lunar geological community insisted on having a geologist on the Moon, so Slayton reassigned Schmitt to Apollo 17.

=== 1966 ===
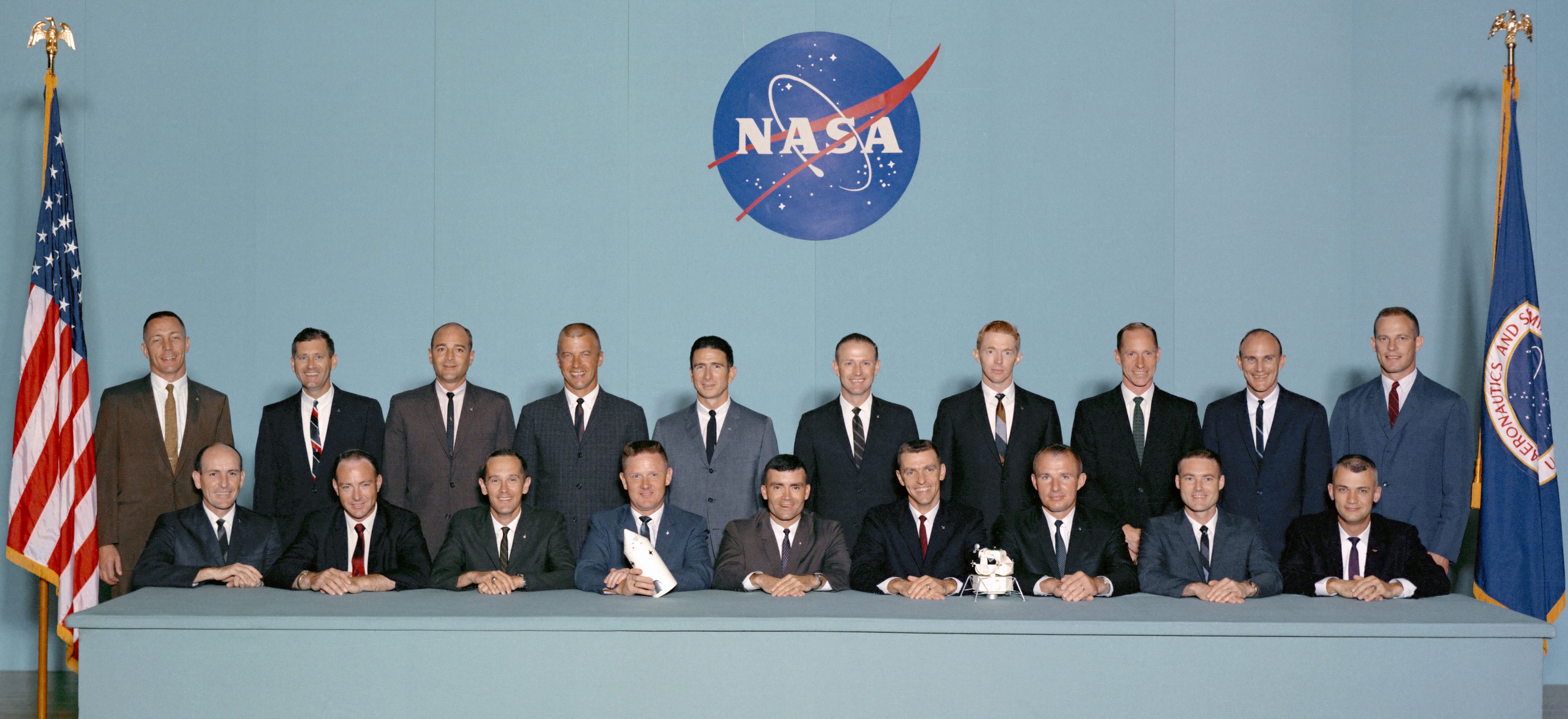
NASA Astronaut Group 5

NASA named a group of 19 more astronauts in April 1966. None had spaceflight experience before their Apollo mission.

- T. Kenneth Mattingly II: selected as prime command module pilot for Apollo 13, Mattingly was exposed to German measles days before the flight and was grounded by the flight surgeon, though ultimately did not contract the disease. He swapped places with his backup and flew on Apollo 16. He also flew on STS-4 and STS-51-C.
- John L. "Jack" Swigert Jr.: flew as Mattingly's backup on Apollo 13.
- Fred W. Haise Jr.: flew as lunar module pilot on the unsuccessful Apollo 13. Haise was selected to command the Apollo 19 lunar landing, which was canceled. Haise would later be named commander of the first crew for the Space Shuttle's Approach and Landing Tests using the prototype Space Shuttle Enterprise.
- Stuart A. Roosa: command module pilot on Apollo 14.
- Edgar D. Mitchell: lunar module pilot on Apollo 14.
- Alfred M. Worden: command module pilot on Apollo 15.
- James B. Irwin: lunar module pilot on Apollo 15.
- Charles M. Duke Jr.: first achieved public recognition as capsule communicator during the Apollo 11 Moon landing; he is notable for the quote: "...we copy you on the ground. You've got a bunch of guys about to turn blue; we're breathing again. Thanks a lot." Duke flew as lunar module pilot on Apollo 16.
- Ronald E. Evans Jr.: command module pilot on Apollo 17.

== Astronauts who trained for Apollo but did not fly ==
- L. Gordon Cooper Jr.: from the Mercury Seven; a veteran of Mercury Faith 7 and commander of Gemini 5, he was replaced as Apollo 14 commander by Alan Shepard and resigned from NASA in 1970.
- Clifton C. "C.C." Williams Jr.: from Group 3; he was named as Schweickart's lunar module pilot backup crew, but was killed when the T-38 jet he was flying crashed near Tallahassee, Florida on October 5, 1967. He was replaced by Bean, who flew on Apollo 12.
- Vance D. Brand: from Group 5; he was on the support crew for Apollo 8 and Apollo 13. He was named as Apollo 15 backup command module pilot. He flew on the 1975 Apollo–Soyuz Test Project (not a flight of the Apollo program). He also flew as commander of STS-5, STS-41-B and STS-35.
- Edward G. Givens Jr.: from Group 5; he was on the support crew of Apollo 7, but died in a car crash near Houston, Texas on June 6, 1967.
- Joe H. Engle: from Group 5; he was originally named as Apollo 17 lunar module pilot, but lost his slot to Schmitt. After Apollo, he flew in the Space Shuttle Approach and Landing Tests, then commanded STS-2 and STS-51-I.

== Apollo astronauts who flew to the Moon ==
=== Apollo astronauts who walked on the Moon ===
Twelve men walked on the Moon during six Moon landings of the Apollo program between July 1969 and December 1972. All landed on the surface only once, and five missions consisted of two or more surface extravehicular activities (EVAs). Four of them are alive as of February 2026 with an average age of 93.4 years. Most astronauts at that time came from the military services and were considered to be on active duty during their NASA service. The few exceptions were considered civilian NASA astronauts, regardless of any prior military service.

On the last of their three Apollo 17 EVAs, Harrison Schmitt stepped out of the Apollo Lunar Module onto the surface of the Moon after Gene Cernan, and is therefore the 12th and most recent person to have stepped out onto the Moon. When they re-entered the Lunar Module, Cernan stepped in last, and is therefore the last person to have walked on the Moon.

Alan Shepard was the oldest person to walk on the Moon, at age 47 years and 80 days. Charles Duke was the youngest, at age 36 years and 201 days.

Jim Lovell and Fred Haise were scheduled to walk on the Moon during the Apollo 13 mission, but the lunar landing was aborted following an explosion in the spacecraft service module en route to the Moon. Haise was scheduled to walk on the Moon as commander of Apollo 19, but Apollo 18 and Apollo 19 were canceled on September 2, 1970.

Joe Engle had trained on the backup crew for Apollo 14 to explore the Moon with Cernan, but he was replaced by Schmitt on the primary crew for Apollo 17. Schmitt had previously been crewed with Apollo 12 Command Module pilot Dick Gordon in anticipation of Apollo 18, but Schmitt replaced Engle on Apollo 17 after the cancellation of Apollo 18 and Apollo 19, leaving Gordon as the last Apollo astronaut to train extensively for lunar exploration without ever landing on the Moon.

Apollo astronauts who walked on the Moon
	Portrait	Name and group	Born	Died	Age at first step	Mission	Lunar Module Landing Time (UTC)	Lunar Module Ascent Time (UTC)	Elapsed Time on Lunar Surface	Lunar EVAs	Total EVA Duration	Military service	Education
1		Neil Armstrong (NASA Astronaut Group 2)	August 5, 1930	August 25, 2012 (aged 82)	38 years, 349 days	Apollo 11	July 20, 1969 at 20:17	July 21, 1969 at 17:54	21 hours 37 minutes	1	2 hours 31 minutes	Civilian (Note: Armstrong had mustered out of the US Navy, and was already a NASA test pilot when he and Elliot See became the first civilian astronauts in Astronaut Group 2; see Armstrong's NASA biography and a description of his receiving a NASA award, among others.) (Navy veteran)	Purdue University (BS), University of Southern California (MS)
2		Buzz Aldrin (NASA Astronaut Group 3)	January 20, 1930 (age 96)		39 years, 181 days	Apollo 11	July 20, 1969 at 20:17	July 21, 1969 at 17:54	21 hours 37 minutes	1	2 hours 31 minutes	Air Force	United States Military Academy (BS), MIT (ScD)
3		Pete Conrad (NASA Astronaut Group 2)	June 2, 1930	July 8, 1999 (aged 69)	39 years, 170 days	Apollo 12	November 19, 1969 at 6:54	November 20, 1969 at 14:25	1 day 7 hours 31 minutes	2	7 hours 45 minutes	Navy	Princeton University (BS)
4		Alan Bean (NASA Astronaut Group 3)	March 15, 1932	May 26, 2018 (aged 86)	37 years, 249 days	Apollo 12	November 19, 1969 at 6:54	November 20, 1969 at 14:25	1 day 7 hours 31 minutes	2	7 hours 45 minutes	Navy	University of Texas, Austin (BS)
5		Alan Shepard (Mercury Seven)	November 18, 1923	July 21, 1998 (aged 74)	47 years, 79 days	Apollo 14	February 5, 1971 at 9:18	February 6, 1971 at 18:48	1 day 9 hours 30 minutes	2	9 hours 22 minutes	Navy	United States Naval Academy (BS), Naval War College (Diploma)
6		Edgar Mitchell (NASA Astronaut Group 5)	September 17, 1930	February 4, 2016 (aged 85)	40 years, 141 days	Apollo 14	February 5, 1971 at 9:18	February 6, 1971 at 18:48	1 day 9 hours 30 minutes	2	9 hours 22 minutes	Navy	Carnegie Mellon University (BS), Naval Postgraduate School (BS), MIT (ScD)
7		David Scott (NASA Astronaut Group 3)	June 6, 1932 (age 94)		39 years, 55 days	Apollo 15	July 30, 1971 at 22:16	August 2, 1971 at 17:11	2 days 18 hours 55 minutes	3	18 hours 34 minutes	Air Force	University of Michigan, United States Military Academy (BS), MIT (MS, EAA)
8		James Irwin (NASA Astronaut Group 5)	March 17, 1930	August 8, 1991 (aged 61)	41 years, 136 days	Apollo 15	July 30, 1971 at 22:16	August 2, 1971 at 17:11	2 days 18 hours 55 minutes	3	18 hours 34 minutes	Air Force	United States Naval Academy (BS), University of Michigan (MS)
9		John Young (NASA Astronaut Group 2)	September 24, 1930	January 5, 2018 (aged 87)	41 years, 210 days	Apollo 16	April 21, 1972 at 2:23	April 24, 1972 at 1:25	2 days 23 hours 2 minutes	3	20 hours 14 minutes	Navy	Georgia Institute of Technology (BS)
10		Charles Duke (NASA Astronaut Group 5)	October 3, 1935 (age 91)		36 years, 201 days	Apollo 16	April 21, 1972 at 2:23	April 24, 1972 at 1:25	2 days 23 hours 2 minutes	3	20 hours 14 minutes	Air Force	United States Naval Academy (BS), MIT (MS)
11		Eugene Cernan (NASA Astronaut Group 3)	March 14, 1934	January 16, 2017 (aged 82)	38 years, 272 days	Apollo 17	December 11, 1972 at 19:54	December 14, 1972 at 22:54	3 days 3 hours 0 minutes	3	22 hours 3 minutes	Navy	Purdue University (BS), Naval Postgraduate School (MS)
12		Harrison Schmitt (NASA Astronaut Group 4)	July 3, 1935 (age 91)		37 years, 161 days	Apollo 17	December 11, 1972 at 19:54	December 14, 1972 at 22:54	3 days 3 hours 0 minutes	3	22 hours 3 minutes	Civilian (Note: Schmitt, a geologist, was chosen as a scientist in Astronaut Group 4.)	Caltech (BS), University of Oslo, Harvard University (PhD)

=== Apollo astronauts who flew to the Moon's vicinity without landing ===
Besides the 12 people who have walked on the Moon, 12 more have flown to within 0.001 lunar distance of its surface. As of February 2026, only Fred Haise is alive at age 93 years. During each of the six missions with successful lunar landings, one astronaut remained in lunar orbit while the other two landed. In addition, the three-person crews of Apollo 8 and Apollo 10 also entered lunar orbit, and the crew of Apollo 13 looped around the Moon 158 miles above the surface on a free-return trajectory.

All nine crewed Apollo missions to the Moon's vicinity took place over a period of just under four years, from December 21, 1968, to December 19, 1972.

Jim Lovell, John Young, and Eugene Cernan are the only three people to have flown to the Moon's vicinity twice. Young and Cernan each set foot on the Moon during their respective second lunar missions, while Lovell is the only person to have flown to the Moon's vicinity twice without landing.

During Cernan's first lunar mission on Apollo 10, he tied the present record set by Bill Anders on Apollo 8 as the youngest person to fly to the Moon's vicinity. Each was 35 years and 65 days old on his launch date and 35 years and 68 days old when he entered lunar orbit. The oldest person to fly to the Moon's vicinity was Alan Shepard, who walked on the Moon during the Apollo 14 mission. Shepard was 47 years and 74 days old on his launch date and 47 years and 78 days old when he entered lunar orbit.

Jim Lovell and Fred Haise were scheduled to walk on the Moon during the Apollo 13 mission, but the lunar landing was aborted following a major malfunction en route to the Moon. Haise was again scheduled to walk on the Moon as commander of Apollo 19, but Apollo 18 and Apollo 19 were canceled in 1970. Because of Apollo 13's free-return trajectory, Lovell, Swigert and Haise flew higher above the Moon's 180° meridian (opposite Earth) than anyone had previously flown (254 km/158 mi). Coincidentally, due to the Moon's distance from Earth at the time, they simultaneously set the record for humans' greatest distance from Earth, reaching an altitude of 400,171 km (248,655 mi) above sea level at 0:21 UTC on April 15, 1970. Both of those records stood for just under 56 years until Artemis II's lunar flyby in 2026.

Apollo astronauts who flew to the Moon's vicinity without landing
	Portrait	Name and group	Born	Died	Age	Mission	Military service	Notes
1		Frank Borman (NASA Astronaut Group 2)	March 14, 1928	November 7, 2023 (aged 95)	40	Apollo 8 December 21–27, 1968	Air Force	
2		Jim Lovell (NASA Astronaut Group 2)	March 25, 1928	August 7, 2025 (aged 97)	40 42	Apollo 8 December 21–27, 1968; Apollo 13; April 11–17, 1970	Navy	Intended to land on Apollo 13; only person to fly to the Moon's vicinity twice without landing.
3		Bill Anders (NASA Astronaut Group 3)	October 17, 1933	June 7, 2024 (aged 90)	35	Apollo 8 December 21–27, 1968	Air Force	
4		Tom Stafford (NASA Astronaut Group 2)	September 17, 1930	March 18, 2024 (aged 93)	38	Apollo 10; May 18–26, 1969	Air Force	Later flew on Apollo–Soyuz Test Project.
5		Michael Collins (NASA Astronaut Group 3)	October 31, 1930	April 28, 2021 (aged 90)	38	Apollo 11; July 16–24, 1969	Air Force	
6		Dick Gordon (NASA Astronaut Group 3)	October 5, 1929	November 6, 2017 (aged 88)	40	Apollo 12; November 14–24, 1969	Navy	Trained to land, slated for Apollo 18 (canceled).
7		Jack Swigert (NASA Astronaut Group 5)	August 30, 1931	December 27, 1982 (aged 51)	38	Apollo 13; April 11–17, 1970	Air Force	
8		Fred Haise (NASA Astronaut Group 5)	November 14, 1933 (age 93)		36	Apollo 13; April 11–17, 1970	Marines, Air Force	Intended to land; later trained to land and slated to command Apollo 19 (canceled); flew the Space Shuttle on approach / landing tests.
9		Stuart Roosa (NASA Astronaut Group 5)	August 16, 1933	December 12, 1994 (aged 61)	37	Apollo 14; January 31 – February 9, 1971	Air Force	In rotation to land on Apollo 20 (canceled).
10		Alfred Worden (NASA Astronaut Group 5)	February 7, 1932	March 18, 2020 (aged 88)	39	Apollo 15; July 26 – August 7, 1971	Air Force	
11		Ken Mattingly (NASA Astronaut Group 5)	March 17, 1936	October 31, 2023 (aged 87)	36	Apollo 16; April 16–27, 1972	Navy	Later flew two Space Shuttle missions.
12		Ronald Evans (NASA Astronaut Group 5)	November 10, 1933	April 7, 1990 (aged 56)	39	Apollo 17; December 7–19, 1972	Navy	

== Apollo astronauts who remained in Earth orbit ==
In addition to the nine lunar missions, there were two crewed flights in the Apollo program that remained in Earth orbit to test fly the spacecraft. Apollo 7 was a crewed test flight of the CSM, and Apollo 9 was a crewed flight test of the CSM and LEM. Of the six astronauts who participated in these missions, five were never rotated to a lunar mission. In addition, the three Skylab missions and Apollo–Soyuz Test Project used crewed CSMs in Earth orbit and are considered part of the Apollo Applications Project. Although Conrad, Bean, and Stafford commanded three of these four flights, the remaining crew members were rookies and thus had long missed the opportunity to fly a Moon mission. Of the seven rookies who flew Skylab, three of them (Paul J. Weitz, Owen K. Garriott, and Jack R. Lousma) would return to space aboard the Space Shuttle. Vance Brand flew on ASTP as Command Module Pilot and would command three Shuttle missions. Except for Garriott, all Apollo astronauts who also flew on the Shuttle served as commander.

	Portrait	Name and group	Born	Died	Age at launch	Mission	Astronaut service	Notes
1		Walter M. Schirra, Jr. (NASA Astronaut Group 1)	March 12, 1923	May 3, 2007 (aged 84)	45	Apollo 7 October 11–22, 1968	Navy	Only astronaut to fly on Mercury, Gemini and Apollo programs
2		Donn F. Eisele (NASA Astronaut Group 3)	June 23, 1930	December 1, 1987 (aged 57)	38	Apollo 7 October 11–22, 1968	Air Force	
3		R. Walter Cunningham (NASA Astronaut Group 3)	March 16, 1932	January 3, 2023 (aged 90)	36	Apollo 7 October 11–22, 1968	Marine Corps Reserve	
4		James A. McDivitt (NASA Astronaut Group 2)	June 10, 1929	October 13, 2022 (aged 93)	39	Apollo 9 March 3–13, 1969	Air Force	Previously flew on Gemini 4.
5		Russell L. Schweickart (NASA Astronaut Group 3)	October 25, 1935 (age 91)		33	Apollo 9 March 3–13, 1969	Air Force	
6		Joseph P. Kerwin (NASA Astronaut Group 4)	February 19, 1932 (age 94)		41	Skylab 2 May 25–June 22, 1973	Navy	First medical doctor in space.
7		Paul J. Weitz (NASA Astronaut Group 5)	July 25, 1932	October 22, 2017 (aged 85)	40	Skylab 2 May 25–June 22, 1973	Navy	Later flew on the maiden flight of Space Shuttle Challenger (STS-6).
8		Owen K. Garriott (NASA Astronaut Group 4)	November 22, 1930	April 15, 2019 (aged 88)	42	Skylab 3 July 28–September 25, 1973	NASA	Later flew on the first Shuttle–Spacelab mission (STS-9)
9		Jack R. Lousma (NASA Astronaut Group 5)	February 29, 1936 (age 90)		36	Skylab 3 July 28–September 25, 1973	Marines	Later flew on the third Space Shuttle mission (STS-3)
10		Gerald P. Carr (NASA Astronaut Group 5)	August 22, 1932	August 26, 2020 (aged 88)	41	Skylab 4 November 16, 1973–February 8, 1974	Marines	Trained to land as LEM pilot for the cancelled Apollo 19 mission
11		Edward P. Gibson (NASA Astronaut Group 4)	November 8, 1936 (age 90)		37	Skylab 4 November 16, 1973–February 8, 1974	NASA	
12		William R. Pogue (NASA Astronaut Group 5)	January 23, 1930	March 3, 2014 (aged 84)	43	Skylab 4 November 16, 1973–February 8, 1974	Air Force	Trained to fly as CSM pilot for the cancelled Apollo 19 mission
13		Vance D. Brand (NASA Astronaut Group 5)	May 9, 1931 (age 95)		44	Apollo–Soyuz Test Project; July 15–21, 1975	Marine Corps Reserve	Later flew on three Space Shuttle missions (STS-5, STS-41-B, and STS-35)
14		Donald K. Slayton (NASA Astronaut Group 1)	March 1, 1924	June 13, 1993 (aged 69)	51	Apollo–Soyuz Test Project; July 15–21, 1975	Air Force	NASA Chief of the Astronaut Office (1962–1964). Only one of the original Mercury Seven astronauts who didn't fly on a Mercury mission

== Astronauts who died during the Apollo Program ==
Three astronauts died on the ground while training for the first crewed Apollo mission, Apollo 1.

	Portrait	Name and group	Born	Died	Mission	Astronaut service	Notes
1		Virgil I. Grissom (NASA Astronaut Group 1)	April 3, 1926	January 27, 1967 (aged 40)	Apollo 1	Air Force	Would have been his third spaceflight. Previously flew on Liberty Bell 7 and Gemini 3.
2		Edward H. White (NASA Astronaut Group 2)	November 14, 1930	January 27, 1967 (aged 36)	Apollo 1	Air Force	Would have been his second spaceflight. First American to perform a spacewalk during Gemini 4.
3		Roger B. Chaffee (NASA Astronaut Group 3)	February 15, 1935	January 27, 1967 (aged 31)	Apollo 1	Navy	Would have been his first spaceflight.

== See also ==
- Mercury Seven
- List of Gemini astronauts
- List of Artemis astronauts

== Bibliography ==
- Chaikin, Andrew (2007) [1994]. A Man on the Moon: The Voyages of the Apollo Astronauts. London: Penguin Books. ISBN 978-0-14-311235-8. OCLC 958200469.
- Hansen, James R. (2012). First Man: The Life of Neil A. Armstrong. New York: Simon & Schuster. ISBN 978-1-4767-2781-3. OCLC 1029741947.
- Orloff, Richard W. (2000). Apollo by the Numbers: A Statistical Reference. NASA History Series. Washington, DC: NASA History Division, Office of Policy and Plans. ISBN 978-0-16-050631-4. LCCN 00061677. OCLC 829406439. NASA SP-2000-4029.
- Thompson, Neal (2004). Light This Candle: The Life & Times of Alan Shepard, America's First Spaceman (1st ed.). New York: Crown Publishers. ISBN 0-609-61001-5. LCCN 2003015688. OCLC 52631310.
