= List of Gemini astronauts =

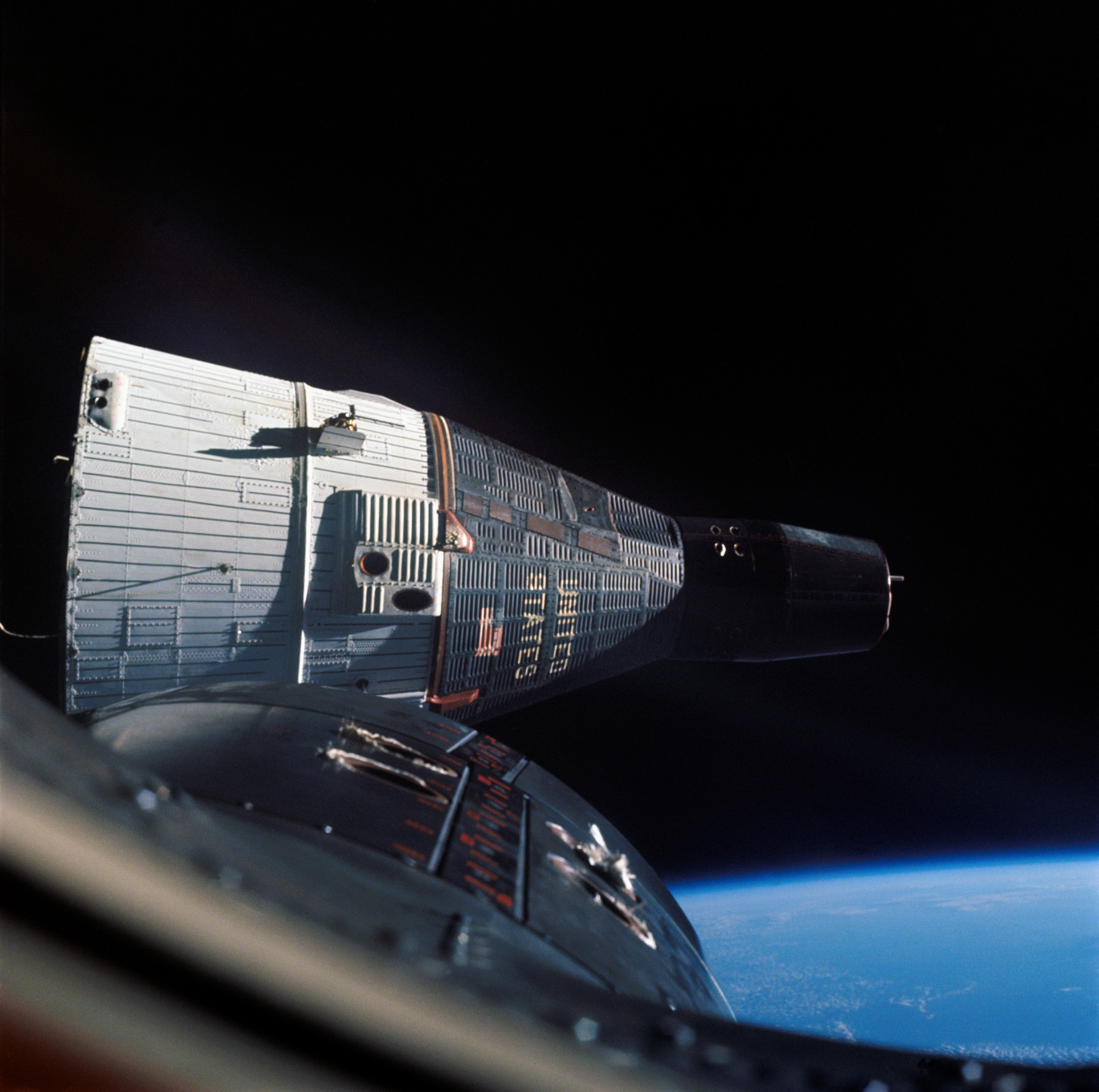
Gemini VI-A (foreground) and Gemini VII make the first rendezvous in orbit between two crewed spacecraft, December 15, 1965

The Gemini astronauts were sixteen pilots who flew in Project Gemini, NASA's second human spaceflight program, between projects Mercury and Apollo. Carrying two astronauts at a time, a senior command pilot and a junior pilot, the Gemini spacecraft was used for ten crewed missions. Four of the sixteen astronauts flew twice.

Gemini was the second phase in the United States space program's larger goal of "landing a man on the Moon and returning him safely to the Earth" before the end of the 1960s, as proposed by president John F. Kennedy. As an intermediary step, Gemini afforded its astronauts the opportunity to gain critical spaceflight experience, performing tasks required in the later Apollo program which fulfilled this objective. Such tasks included rendezvous or station-keeping with other craft, docking, habitation in space over the course of several days, and flying spacecraft with more than one crew member. Importantly, most individuals who flew as Gemini astronauts returned to space as key personnel in the Apollo program, bringing with them their first-hand experience of the operations carried out during Gemini. Among the Gemini astronauts, six later walked on the Moon, another five flew to the Moon without landing, and two participated in Low Earth orbit Apollo missions. Gus Grissom and Ed White were killed in the Apollo 1 disaster, and former Mercury astronaut Gordon Cooper did not perform any further spaceflights.

All Gemini astronauts–excluding the Mercury Seven astronauts already included–were inducted into the U.S. Astronaut Hall of Fame in 1993.

Astronaut participation in Project Gemini was also a strong predictor for future achievement during the Apollo Program:

- Every Apollo mission commander, including Gus Grissom and with the exception of Alan Shepard, was a Gemini veteran.
- All three crew members of Apollo 11, the first lunar landing-Neil Armstrong, Michael Collins and Buzz Aldrin-were Gemini veterans.
- All three of the men who flew to the Moon twice-Jim Lovell, John Young and Gene Cernan-were Gemini veterans.
- With the exception of Elliot See, every member of NASA's second Astronaut Group—the class of nine men selected following the Mercury Seven—flew as a Gemini astronaut.

As of 9 August 2025, the only surviving Gemini astronauts are David Scott and Buzz Aldrin.

The Gemini Astronauts (Note: Sixteen astronauts filled twenty crew positions, over ten two-man missions. Young, Conrad, Lovell and Stafford each made their first spaceflights as junior Pilots before being promoted to Command Pilots on the program's last four missions.)
Mission	Command Pilot				Crew Portrait	Pilot			
Mission	Name	Spaceflight	AG	Service	Crew Portrait	Name	Spaceflight	AG	Service
Gemini 3	Gus Grissom	Second and last	1	USAF	Young (left), Grissom (right).	John Young	First of six	2	USN
Gemini 4	James McDivitt	First of two	2	USAF	White (left), McDivitt (right).	Ed White	First and only	2	USAF
Gemini 5	Gordon Cooper	Second and last	1	USAF	Conrad (left), Cooper (right).	Pete Conrad	First of four	2	USN
Gemini 7	Frank Borman	First of two	2	USAF	Lovell (left), Borman (right).	Jim Lovell	First of four	2	USN
Gemini 6A	Wally Schirra	Second of three	1	USN	Stafford (left), Schirra (right).	Tom Stafford	First of four	2	USAF
Gemini 8	Neil Armstrong	First of two	2	Civilian (Note: Armstrong had served in the US Navy and United States Navy Reserve from 1949 to 1960, but was retired from active duty when he became a NASA astronaut.)	Scott (left), Armstrong (right).	David Scott	First of three	3	USAF
Gemini 9A	Tom Stafford	Second of four	2	USAF	Stafford (left), Cernan (right).	Gene Cernan	First of three	3	USN
Gemini 10	John Young	Second of six	2	USN	Young (left), Collins (right).	Michael Collins	First of two	3	USAF
Gemini 11	Pete Conrad	Second of four	2	USN	Gordon (left), Conrad (right).	Richard Gordon	First of two	3	USN
Gemini 12	Jim Lovell	Second of four	2	USN	Aldrin (left), Lovell (right).	Buzz Aldrin	First of two	3	USAF

== Key ==
Later walked on the Moon as an Apollo astronaut
Later flew to the Moon as an Apollo astronaut, without landing
Later flew a low-Earth orbit mission as an Apollo astronaut
Performed no later spaceflights
Later killed in the Apollo 1 disaster
