= Thomas P. Stafford =

American astronaut (1930–2024)

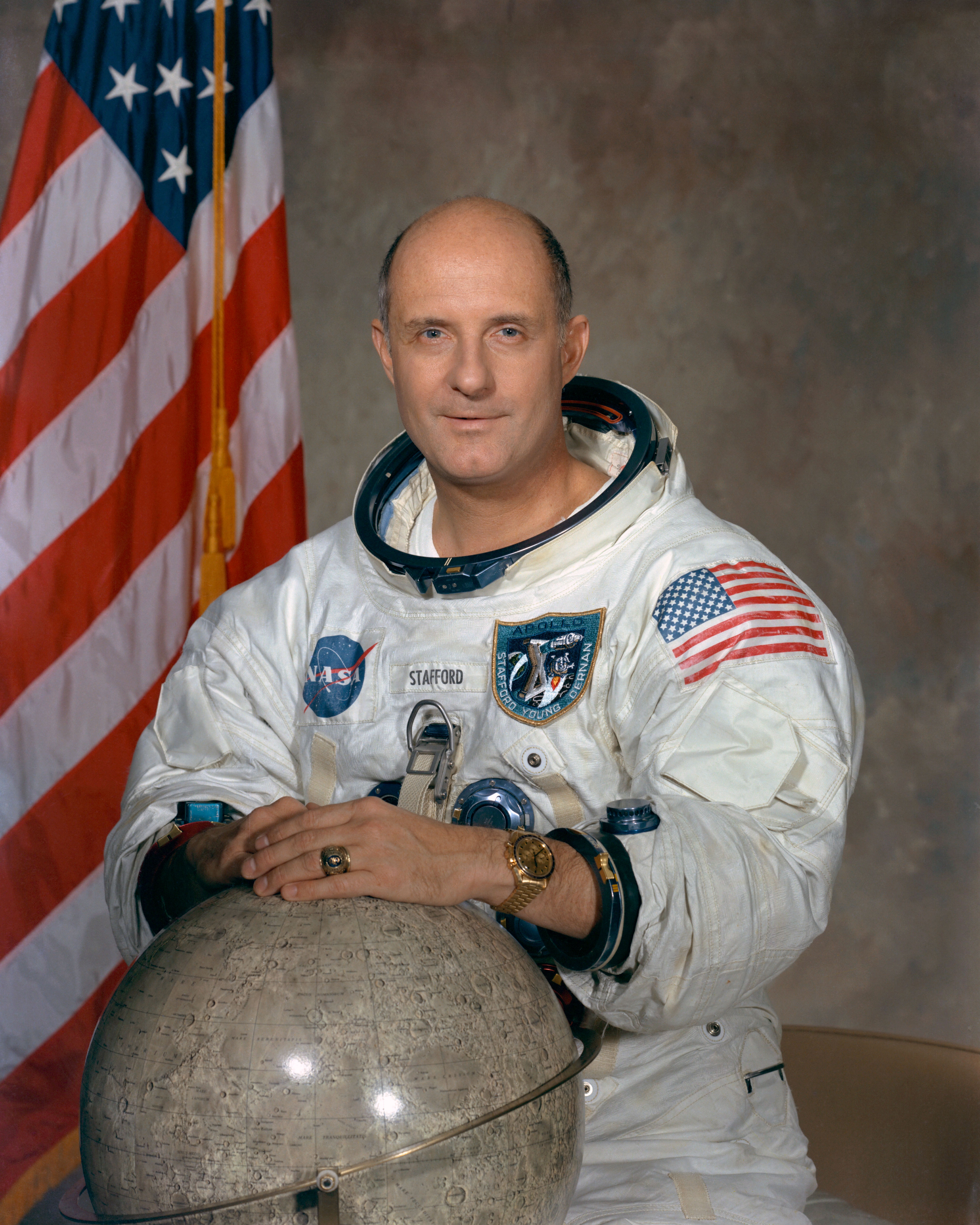
- Stafford in 1972
- Born: Thomas Patten Stafford; September 17, 1930; Weatherford, Oklahoma, U.S.
- Died: March 18, 2024 (aged 93); Satellite Beach, Florida, U.S.
- Education: United States Naval Academy (BS)
- Spouse(s): Faye Shoemaker (m. 1953; div. 1985) Linda Ann Dishman (m. 1988)
- Children: 4 (2 adopted)
- Awards: Distinguished Flying Cross; Congressional Space Medal of Honor; NASA Distinguished Service Medal; Medal "For Merit in Space Exploration"
- Space career

NASA astronaut
- Rank: Lieutenant General, USAF
- Time in space: 21d 3h 42m
- Selection: NASA Group 2 (1962)
- Mission: Gemini 6A; Gemini 9A; Apollo 10; Apollo–Soyuz Test Project
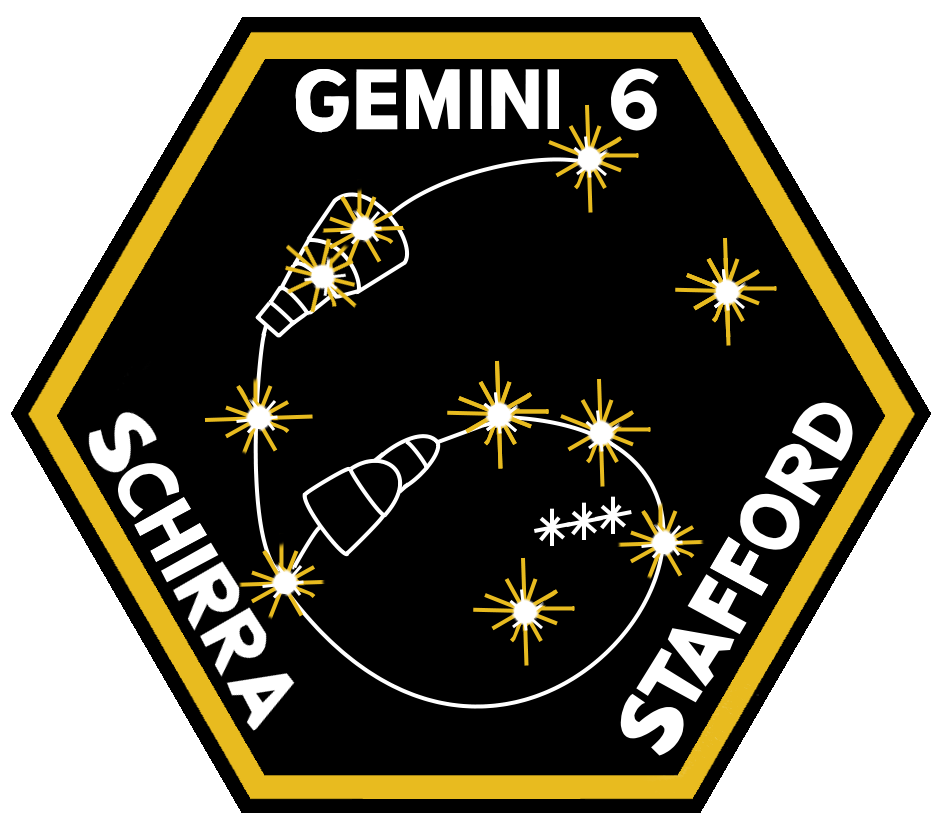
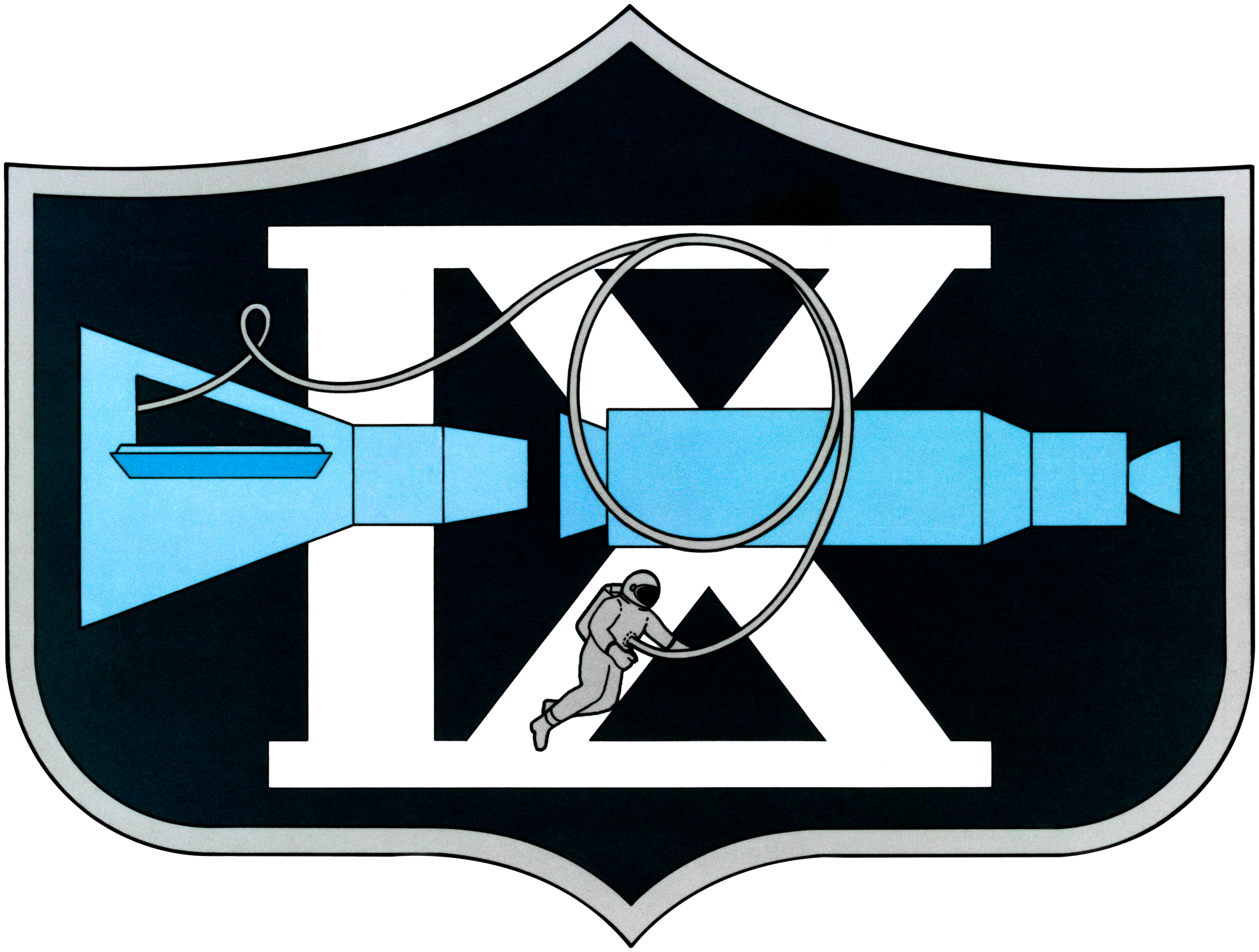
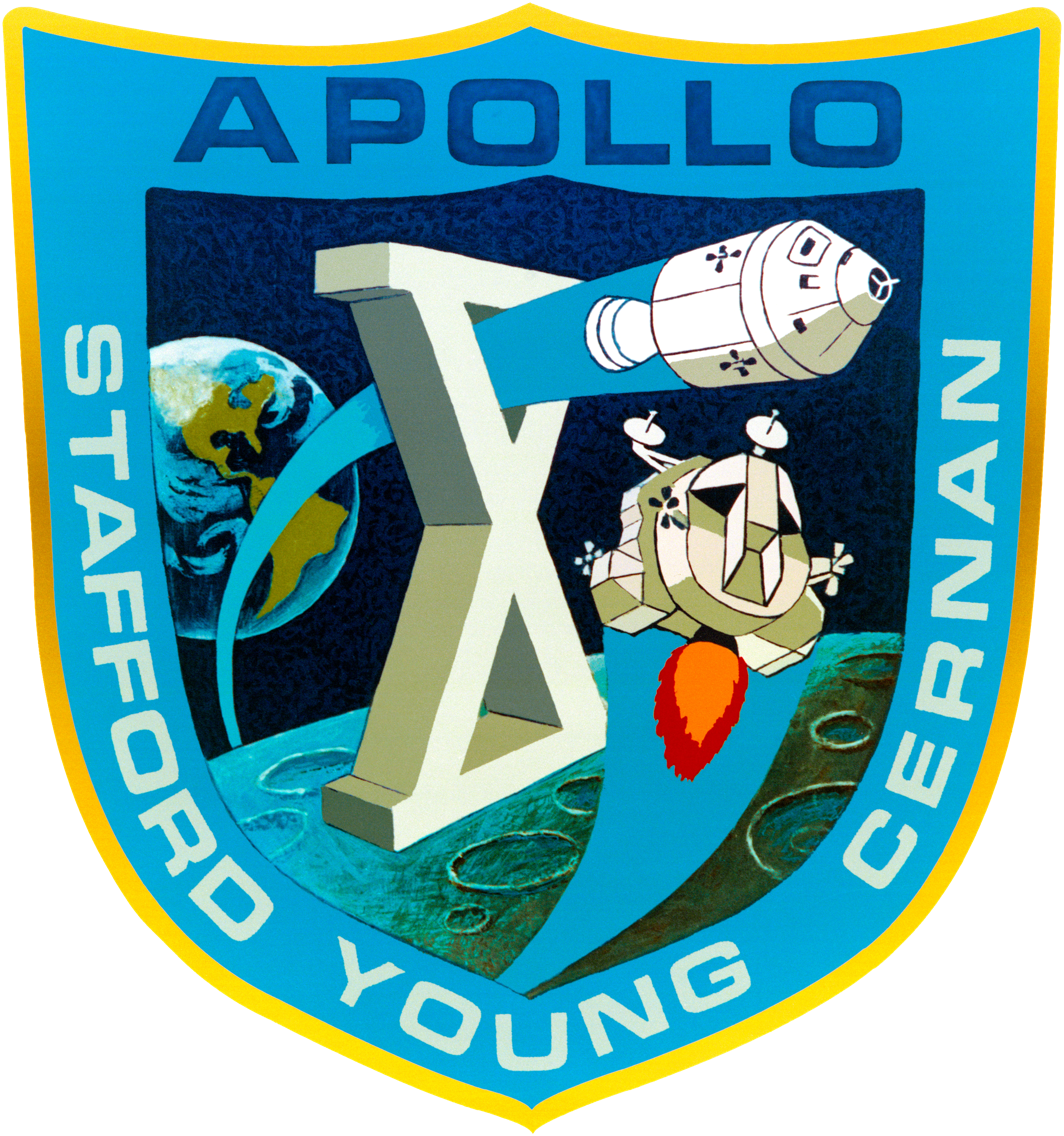
- Mission insignia
- Retired: November 1, 1979

Thomas Patten Stafford (September 17, 1930 – March 18, 2024) was an American Air Force officer, test pilot, and NASA astronaut, and one of 24 Apollo astronauts who flew to the Moon. He also served as chief of the Astronaut Office from 1969 to 1971.

After graduating from the United States Naval Academy, Stafford was commissioned in the United States Air Force, flying the F-86 Sabre before becoming a test pilot. He was selected to become an astronaut in 1962, and flew aboard Gemini 6A in 1965 and Gemini 9A in 1966. In 1969, he commanded Apollo 10, the second crewed mission to orbit the Moon. Here, he and Gene Cernan became the first to fly an Apollo Lunar Module in lunar orbit, descending to an altitude of nine miles (fourteen kilometres).

In 1975, Stafford was the commander of the Apollo-Soyuz Test Project (ASTP) flight, the first joint U.S.-Soviet space mission. A brigadier general at the time, he became the first general officer to fly in space. He was the first member of his Naval Academy class to pin on the first, second, and third stars of a general officer. He made six rendezvous in space and logged 507 hours of space flight.

Stafford flew more than 120 types of fixed-wing and rotary aircraft and three types of spacecraft. After the deaths of Wally Schirra, Eugene Cernan, and John Young, he was the last surviving crew member of Gemini 6A, Gemini 9A, and Apollo 10.

In 1993, the Stafford Air & Space Museum was founded in his hometown of Weatherford, Oklahoma. Originally just two rooms, it has grown to over 63,000 square feet (5,850 m^{2}) of artifact space. It is a Smithsonian affiliate and is the only museum in the world to house test-fired engines that would have been used in the Space Race: a U.S. F-1 engine and a Soviet NK-33 engine. It holds the Gemini 6 spacecraft that he and Schirra flew in a rendezvous with Gemini 7.

== Early life and education ==
Thomas Patten Stafford was born on September 17, 1930, in Weatherford, Oklahoma, to Dr. Thomas Sabert Stafford, a dentist, and Mary Ellen Stafford (née Patten), a former teacher. Thomas Sabert Stafford was diagnosed with skin cancer in 1944, and died on June 22, 1948. Mary Stafford remained in Weatherford until her death in August 1987. Stafford became interested in aviation following the start of World War II, as the nearby city El Reno has an Army Air Corps training base. Stafford began making model airplanes, and made his first flight at the age of 14 in a Piper Cub. He attended Weatherford High School and graduated in 1948.

In his senior year of high school, Stafford was recruited to play football at the University of Oklahoma, where he had received a Navy ROTC scholarship. Stafford applied to the United States Naval Academy, and was accepted to the Class of 1952. Stafford intended to play football for the Navy Midshipmen, but sustained a career-ending knee injury during a preseason practice session. After his freshman year, he sailed aboard the battleship USS Missouri, where his roommate was John Young, his future Apollo 10 command module pilot. After his second year, Stafford spent a summer at NAS Pensacola, where he was exposed to naval aviation and flew in the SNJ Trainer. On a trip home to Weatherford, Stafford began dating his future wife, Faye Shoemaker. After his third year, he served aboard USS Burdo, a destroyer escorting USS Missouri. While visiting home during his fourth year, Stafford became engaged to Faye in December 1951. In the spring of 1952, he was selected in a lottery to join the United States Air Force upon graduation. (Note: The U.S. Air Force Academy was not yet established at this time.) Stafford graduated from the Naval Academy with a Bachelor of Science degree in engineering with honors in 1952, and was commissioned as a second lieutenant in the Air Force.

== Military service ==
In high school, Stafford served in the 45th Infantry Division in the Oklahoma National Guard. Soon after, he transferred to the division's 158th Field Artillery Battalion, where he plotted targets for artillery fires.

Stafford attended the first phase of pilot training at Greenville AFB, Mississippi, San Marcos AFB, Texas and Connally AFB, Texas, where he flew the T-6 Texan and the T-33 Shooting Star. While on a training mission at San Marcos AFB, he was involved in a mid-air collision with another student pilot. Stafford and his instructor were able to land, but the other student pilot was killed. He graduated from pilot training on September 1, 1953, and moved to Tyndall AFB, Florida, for F-86 Sabre training. In 1954, Stafford was assigned to the 54th Fighter-Interceptor Squadron at Ellsworth AFB, South Dakota, where he flew the F-86 mission for Arctic defense. In 1955, Stafford transferred to the 496th Fighter Interceptor Squadron at Hahn Air Base (now Frankfurt-Hahn Airport), West Germany, again flying interceptor mission in the F-86 Sabre. In addition, he served as an assistant maintenance officer, developing his interest in applying for the USAF Experimental Flight Test Pilot School.

In 1958, Stafford attended the Air Force Test Pilot School at Edwards AFB, California, where he finished first in his class, and received the A. B. Honts Award. After graduation, he remained at Edwards AFB as a flight instructor. While working as an instructor, Stafford created the first civilian instructor position at Test Pilot School to ensure continuity, and co-wrote the Pilot's Handbook for Performance Flight Testing and the Aerodynamics Handbook for Performance Flight Testing. At the end of his assignment, Stafford was accepted at Harvard Business School, and moved to Boston, Massachusetts, in September 1962. Three days after arriving, he was accepted to NASA Group Two.

== NASA career ==
In April 1962, while working as a flight instructor, Stafford applied for the next round of astronaut selection. The required interviews and medical screenings occurred over the summer of 1962 at Brooks Air Force Base and in Houston. On September 14, 1962, Stafford was selected for Astronaut Group 2, alongside eight other future astronauts.

=== Project Gemini ===
==== Gemini 6A ====
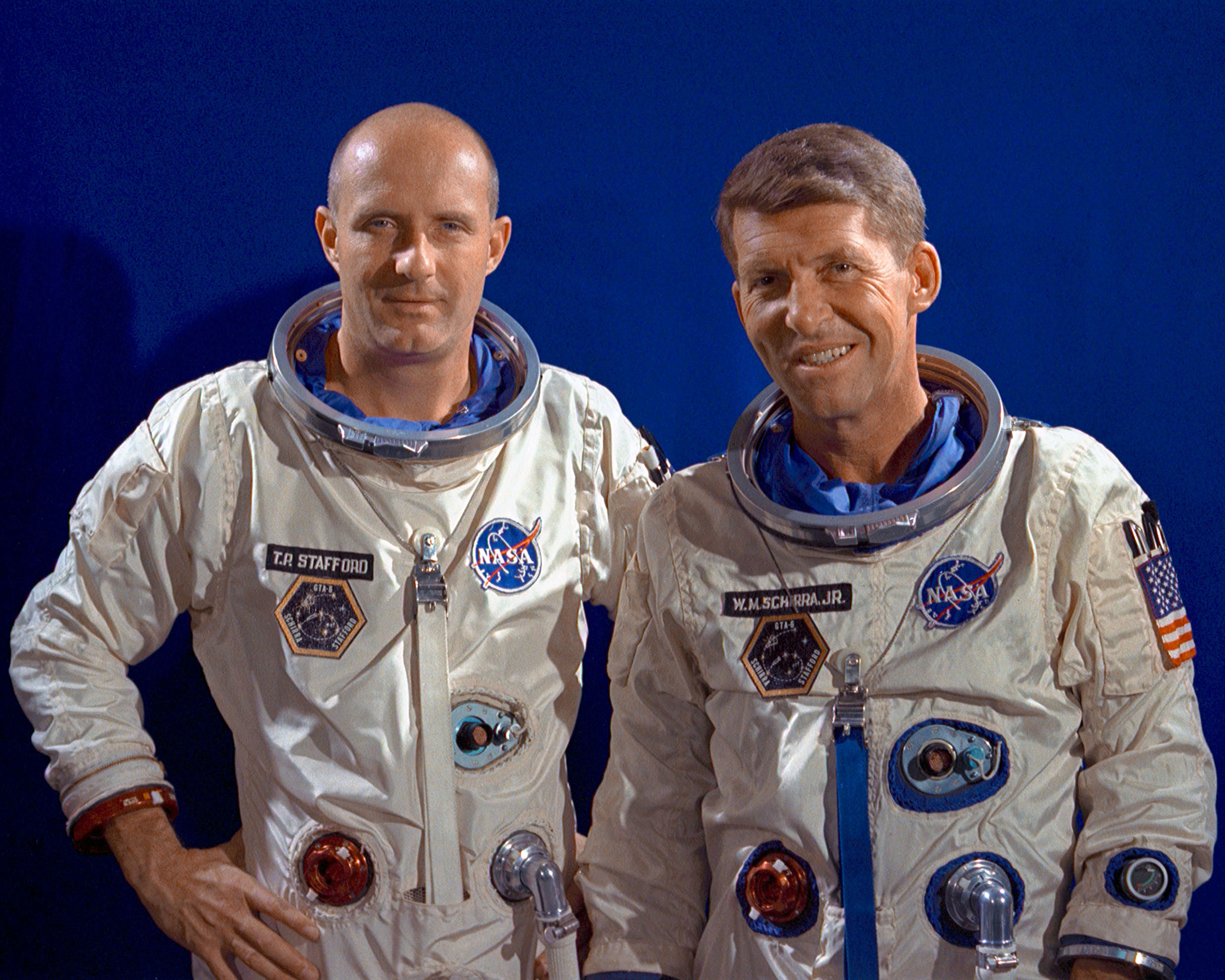
Stafford (left) with his Gemini 6A crewmate Wally Schirra (1965)

Stafford was originally scheduled to fly with Alan Shepard on the first crewed Gemini mission, Gemini 3, but was replaced when Shepard was removed from the flight rotation after being diagnosed with Ménière's disease. Stafford was paired with Wally Schirra as pilot and commander, respectively, and the pair was reassigned as the backup crew for Gemini 3, and primary crew for Gemini 6.

The original Gemini 6 mission profile involved docking with an Agena target vehicle. On October 25, 1965, Schirra and Stafford were inside Gemini 6 before liftoff when the Agena vehicle exploded on ascent. After the original mission was canceled, it was redesignated Gemini 6A and was planned to rendezvous with the long-duration Gemini 7 mission. Gemini 7 lifted off on December 4, 1965. On December 12, 1965, Gemini 6A's ignition was followed by an immediate engine shutdown. Schirra and Stafford did not eject, and the cause of the shutdown was found to be an electrical issue and a cap inadvertently left on a fuel line.

On December 15, 1965, Gemini 6A lifted off and rendezvoused with Gemini 7. The two spacecraft kept station for about five hours, coming within feet of each other. Gemini 6A splashed down on December 16, and was recovered by USS Wasp.

==== Gemini 9A ====
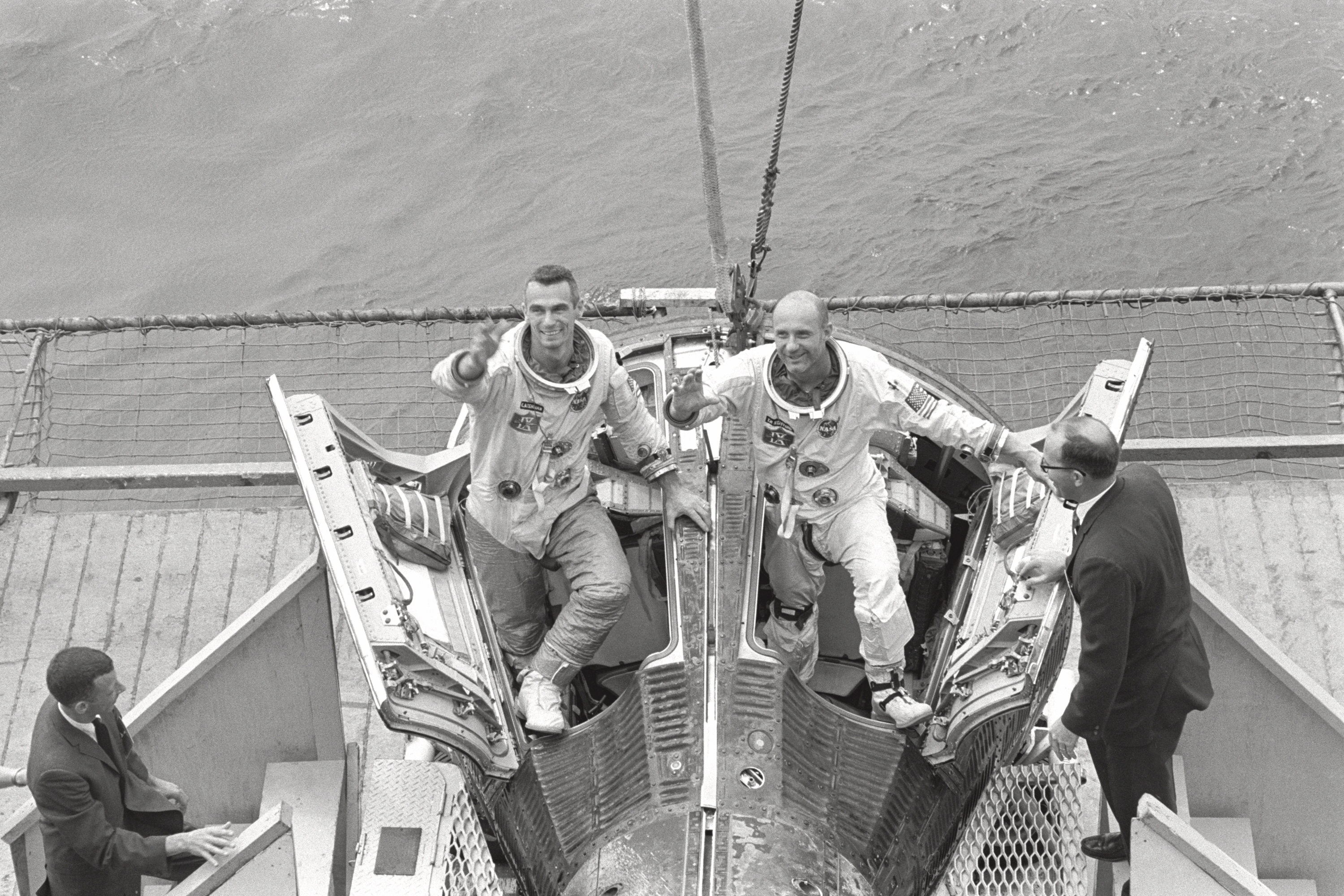
Stafford (right) and Eugene Cernan arrive aboard USS Wasp (1966)

Before Gemini 6A, Stafford was assigned as the backup commander for Gemini 9 with Eugene Cernan as the backup pilot. Charlie Bassett and Elliot See were the primary crew. On February 28, 1966, both crews flew in T-38 Talons to Lambert Field to visit the McDonnell Douglas Gemini assembly facility. Bassett and See crashed on landing, and were killed. Stafford and Cernan became the Gemini 9 primary crew, with Jim Lovell and Buzz Aldrin as their backup crew.

On May 17, 1966, the Agena target vehicle went off course and was shut down before entering orbit. As there was no replacement Agena rocket, the new target for the mission was the Augmented Target Docking Adapter (ATDA), which achieved orbit on June 1, 1966. The Gemini 9A launch, scheduled for later the same day, was canceled due to a computer error. Gemini 9A launched on June 3, and rendezvoused with the ATDA on the second orbit. Its shroud had only partially opened and Gemini 9A was unable to dock with it. Stafford and Cernan instead conducted orbital rendezvous maneuvers with it, including a simulated rescue of a lunar module in a lower orbit.

The following day, Cernan attempted an extravehicular activity (EVA), with the primary mission of testing the Astronaut Maneuvering Unit (AMU). After exiting the spacecraft, Cernan quickly experienced mobility issues, followed by environmental regulation and communication issues. The EVA was aborted, and Cernan returned to the capsule after two hours. On June 6, Gemini 9A landed, and was recovered by USS Wasp.

=== Apollo program ===
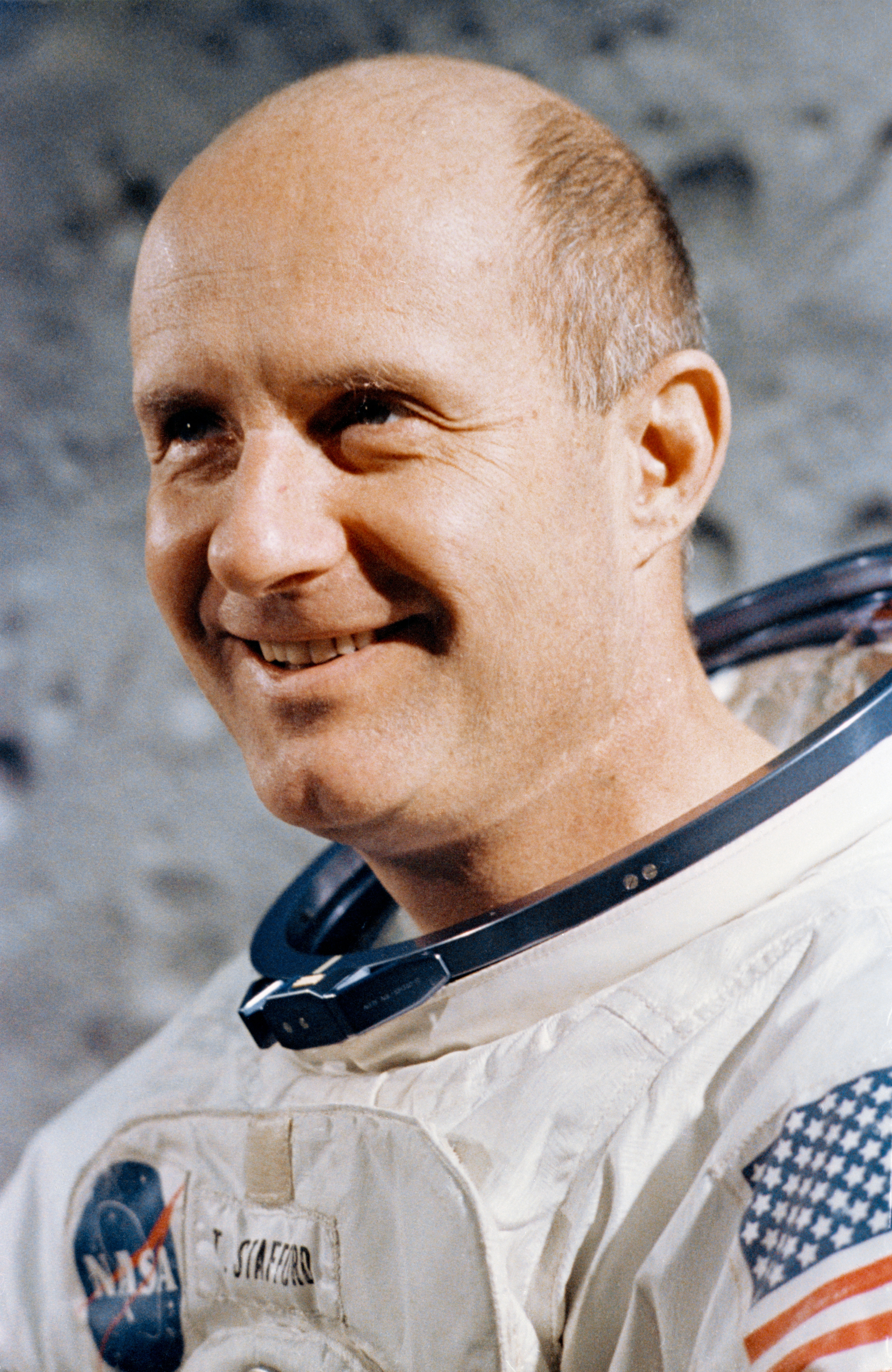
Stafford as Apollo 10 Commander (1969)

After Gemini 9A, Stafford was assigned as the backup command module pilot on what was then planned as Apollo 2, with Frank Borman as the commander and Mike Collins as the lunar module pilot. For his technical assignment, Stafford was tasked as an astronaut liaison for the development of Apollo guidance and navigation systems, as well as the command and service module. In late 1966, he was reassigned to Apollo 2 backup commander, with Apollo 10 crewmates John Young as the command module pilot and Gene Cernan as the lunar module pilot. While testing the command module, they received word of the Apollo 1 fire and subsequent suspension of the Apollo program.

==== Apollo 10 ====
In the spring of 1968, Deke Slayton announced that the previous backup crew for Apollo 2 would become the primary crew for Apollo 10. In preparation for the mission, Stafford helped design a color camera to replace the grainy black-and-white video broadcast before from space; he felt that public outreach was a vital aspect of the mission. The command module (CM) was nicknamed "Charlie Brown"; the lunar module (LM) was nicknamed "Snoopy".

Apollo 10 lifted off on May 18, 1969. Despite heavy oscillation during ascent, Apollo 10 achieved orbit without incident, docked the LM and CM, and achieved its translunar injection burn. Upon arriving in lunar orbit, Stafford and Cernan undocked in the LM and entered an elliptical orbit with a periapsis (the closest distance) of nine miles over the lunar surface. To provide reconnaissance, the periapsis coincided with the Sea of Tranquility, the intended landing site for Apollo 11. Upon ascent, the LM began turning rapidly from a misaligned switch on the Abort Guidance System; Stafford was able to regain control and conduct the burn to rendezvous with the CM. The LM docked with the CM to return the astronauts and was jettisoned. After two days in lunar orbit, Apollo 10 began its return trajectory. Along the return, the capsule traveled at 24,791 mph (39,897 km/h), setting the record for the fastest speed by a human being. Apollo 10 splashed down east of Samoa and was recovered by USS Princeton.

==== Apollo-Soyuz Test Project ====
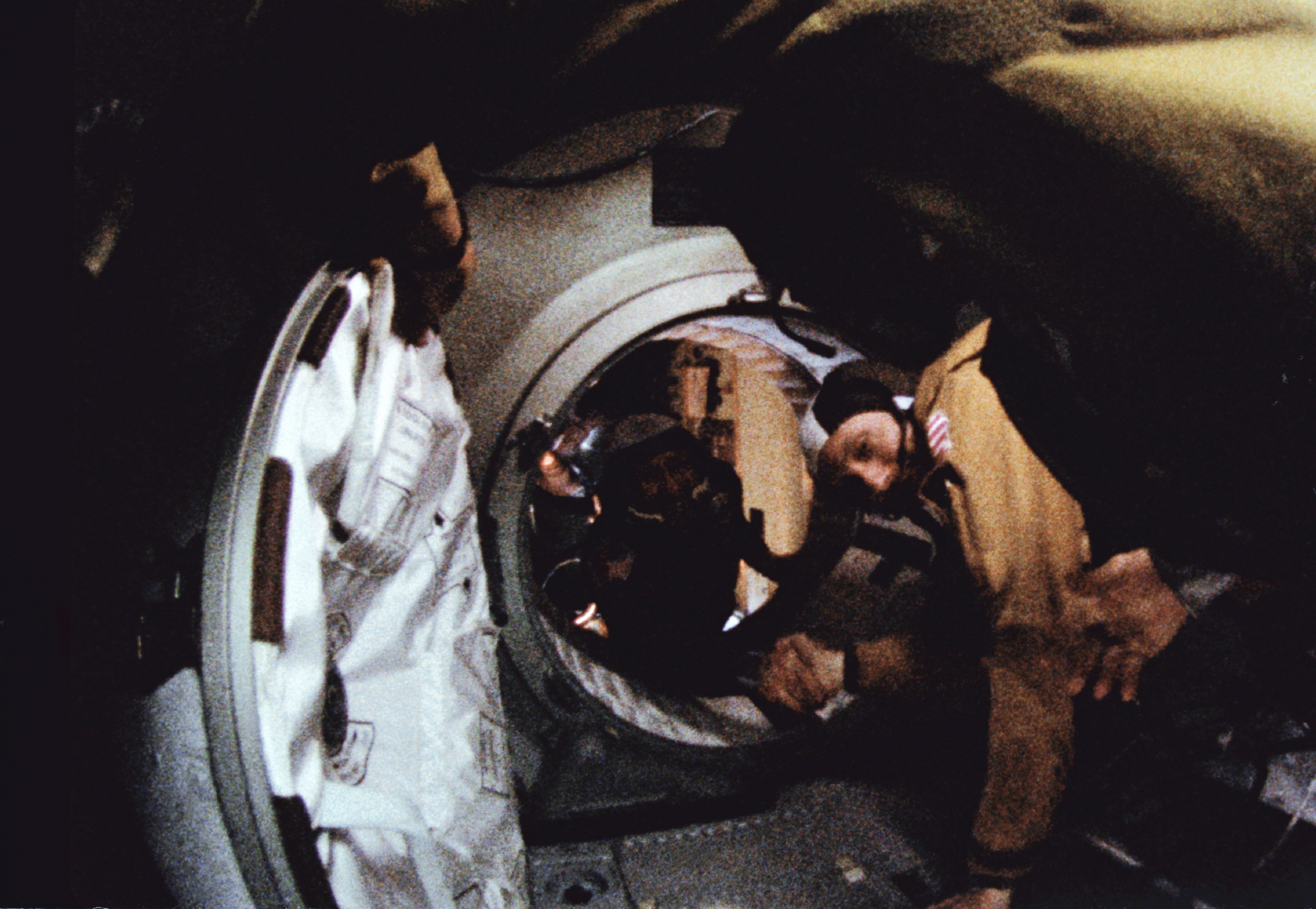
Historic handshake of Stafford (right) and cosmonaut Alexei Leonov during Apollo–Soyuz (1975)

In July 1969, Stafford replaced Alan Shepard (who had returned to flight status) as Chief of the Astronaut Office. Along with Director of Flight Crew Operations Deke Slayton, Stafford oversaw assignments to the upcoming Apollo and Skylab missions until Shepard resumed the position after Apollo 14 in July 1971. During this period, U.S. president Richard Nixon and Soviet premier Alexei Kosygin agreed to the Apollo-Soyuz Test Project (ASTP). Stafford was promoted to the rank of brigadier general in late 1972, and was soon named the commander of ASTP, along with Slayton (who had also returned to flight status) and Vance Brand.

Beginning in 1973, the ASTP team trained extensively in Russia and the United States. Soyuz 19, carrying Alexei Leonov and Valery Kubasov, launched on July 15, 1975, at 12:20 UTC, followed by Apollo at 19:50 UTC. After two days in space, Soyuz and Apollo docked on July 17, where the crews met and conducted joint experiments and held press conferences. After remaining docked for 44 hours, the two spacecraft undocked on July 19. Soyuz returned to Earth on July 21; Apollo remained in orbit until July 24. While descending, the Apollo command module began filling with nitrogen tetroxide from the reaction control thrusters. The crew donned oxygen masks, but Brand lost consciousness and had to be assisted by Stafford. All crew were safely recovered aboard USS New Orleans, and were hospitalized in Hawaii for edema (swelling) from fuel inhalation.

== Post-NASA career ==
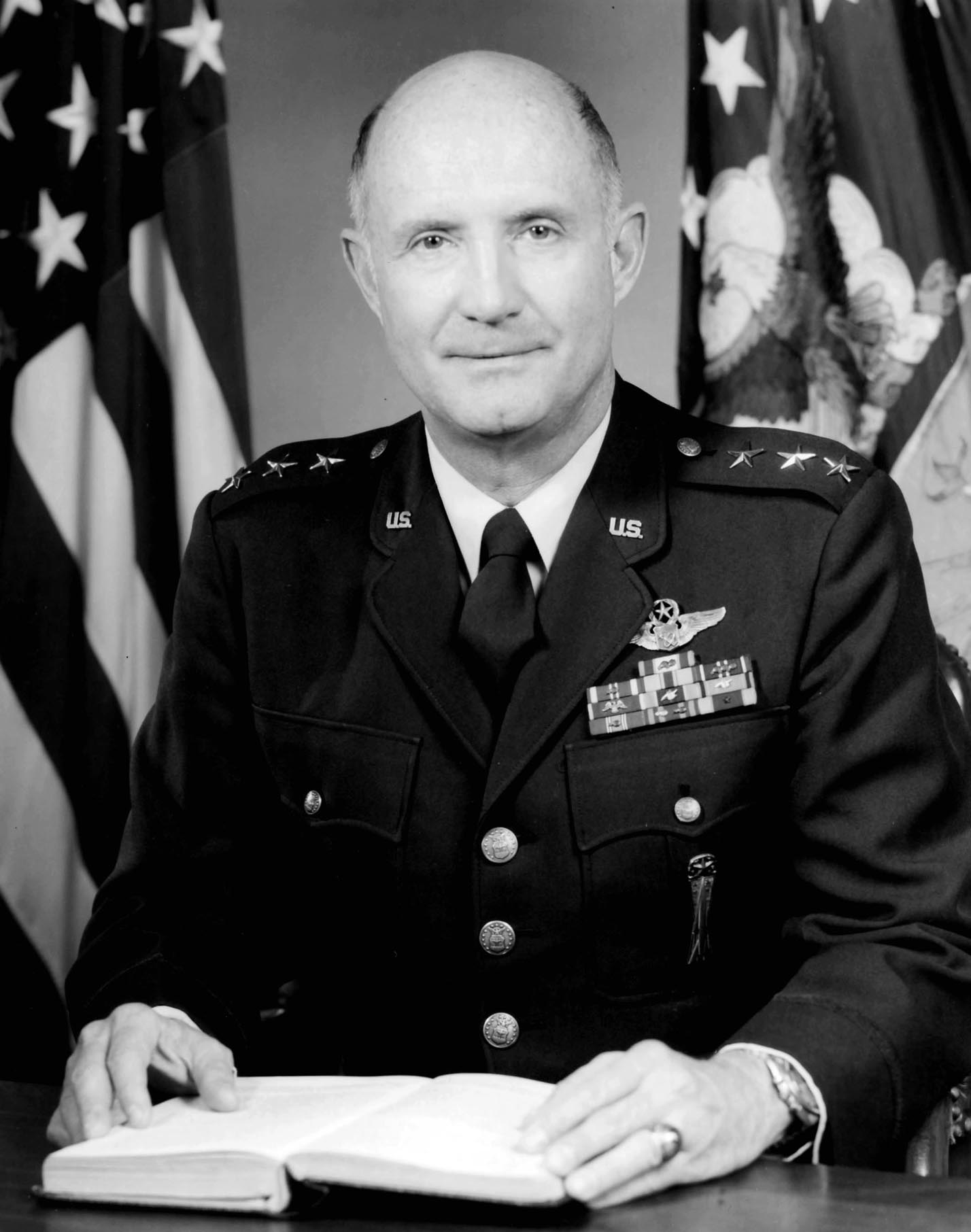
Lieutenant General Thomas Stafford (1979)

In June 1975, before ASTP, Stafford was offered command of the Air Force Flight Test Center at Edwards AFB. He accepted and assumed the assignment on November 15, 1975. Stafford oversaw the Air Force and NASA test facilities at Edwards AFB, as well as test ranges in Utah and Nevada. He continued to fly (including foreign aircraft such as the MiG-17 and Panavia Tornado) and was involved in the interview of Viktor Belenko after his defection. Stafford also managed the development of the XST, which would later evolve into the F-117 Nighthawk. In March 1978, he was promoted to lieutenant general and became Deputy Chief of Staff, Research Development and Acquisition in Washington, D.C. While working in Washington, Stafford advocated for the creation of the mobile MX missile, and began developing the Advanced Technology Bomber, the predecessor to the B-2 stealth bomber.

With no statement of need or requirements, Stafford pushed for and started a larger attack stealth aircraft named Senior Trend, which was later designated the Stealth Attack F-117A. The F-117A flew in just two years and eight months after the contract with Lockheed was signed. The aircraft became operational in less than five years. During Desert Storm, it was the only plane that secured airspace above Baghdad on the opening night of combat in 1991. The F-117A flew less than two percent of the air-to-ground combat missions, but it was responsible for attacking 43 percent of the Iraqi strategic targets.

In early 1979, before giving a speech at the Chicago chapter of the Air Force Association, Stafford met with the chairman of Northrop whose company had started a low-speed experimental stealth reconnaissance program for DARPA and the U.S. Army using smooth surfaces. On a piece of hotel stationery, Stafford wrote specs for range, payload, radar cross-section, and gross take-off weight for an advanced stealth technology bomber, which later became designated as the B-2. To further enhance his emphasis on stealth, he started a competition between the firms of Boeing, General Dynamics, and also included Lockheed because of their stealth technology, to develop a stealth supercruise missile. Out of that came the AGM-129 Stealth Cruise missile developed by General Dynamics. It was a 2,000 nautical mile super stealth nuclear-armed cruise missile with a W-80-1 warhead and 130 Kilotons yield. He then started the Advanced Tactical Fighter (ATF) program to replace the F-15 (now the F-22) as an air superiority fighter. Stafford retired to Norman, Oklahoma, on November 1, 1979.

Following his retirement, Stafford served on several corporate boards, including Omega SA, Gibraltar Exploration, and Gulfstream Aerospace. He originally intended to reunite with his ASTP crewmates in Russia, but the 1979 Soviet invasion of Afghanistan, and the subsequent 1980 Olympics boycott, left them unable to travel to Russia. Stafford created a consulting firm, Stafford, Burke, and Hecker, with two recently retired United States Air Force general officers, Lieutenant General Kelly H. Burke, and Major General Guy L. Hecker Jr. In July 1990, Vice President Quayle and Admiral Richard Truly, then the NASA administrator, asked Stafford to chair a committee (the "Synthesis Committee") that advised NASA on their overall effort toward long-term lunar and Mars missions, the Space Exploration Initiative. Stafford and his team of 42 full-time members and 150 part-time members created a long-term plan with lunar missions in 2004 and a Mars mission in 2012. In 1992, Stafford began work as an advisor for Space Station Freedom, the precursor to the International Space Station (ISS). While coordinating Russian involvement, Stafford became a technical advisor for the Shuttle–Mir program, particularly STS-63 and STS-71. He also served on a review committee for the Progress-Mir Collision.

In 2002, Stafford published an autobiography written with Michael Cassutt, titled We Have Capture: Tom Stafford and the Space Race. He also wrote the epilogue of the 2011 book Falling to Earth: An Apollo 15 Astronaut's Journey to the Moon by fellow Apollo astronaut Al Worden.

Stafford and Soviet commander Alexey Leonov, became lasting friends, with Leonov being the godfather of Stafford's younger children. Stafford gave a eulogy in Russian at Leonov's funeral in October 2019.

== Personal life and death ==
In 1953, Stafford married Faye Shoemaker from Weatherford, Oklahoma. Faye and Stafford had two daughters, Dionne (born 1954) and Karin (born 1957). Faye and Stafford divorced in 1985. Stafford later married Linda Ann Dishman in December 1988. They had two adopted sons, Michael Thomas and Stanislav "Stas" Patten. Stafford enjoyed hunting, weight lifting, gliding, scuba diving, fishing and swimming.

Stafford died from liver cancer at a care home in Satellite Beach, Florida, on March 18, 2024, at the age of 93.

== Awards and honors ==
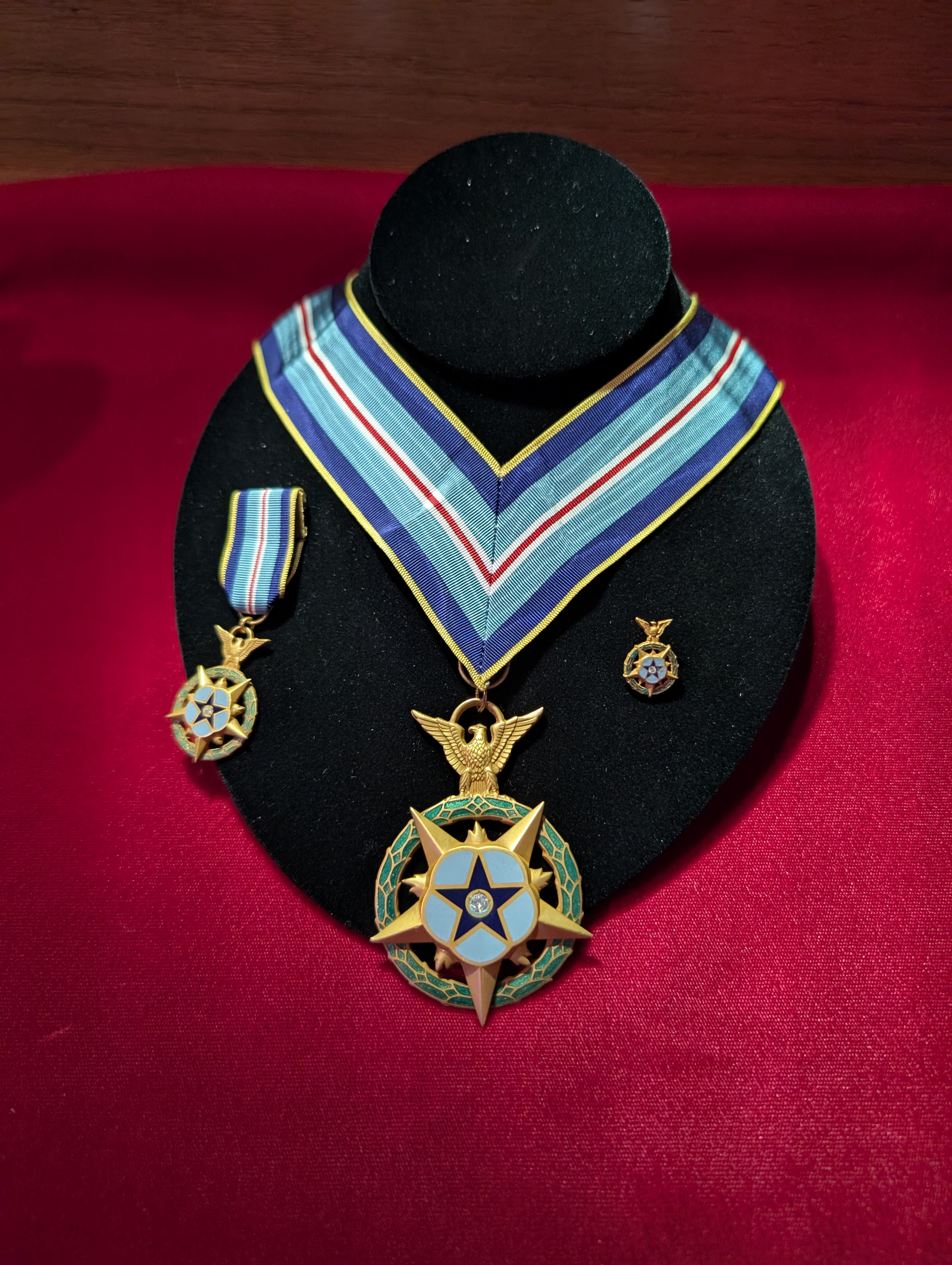
Thomas Stafford's Space Medal of Honor display

This is the greatest honor of my life. I am very proud to have contributed to our nation's future in space and I am deeply grateful for the opportunity to have participated in the beginning of America's venture into the new and endless frontier.

— Upon receiving the Congressional Space Medal of Honor.

Throughout his career, Stafford received numerous awards for his accomplishments. He was a recipient of the American Institute of Aeronautics and Astronautics (AIAA) Award (1969), the Harmon International Aviation Trophy (1966), the National Academy of Television Arts and Sciences Special Trustees Award (1969), the Society of Experimental Test Pilots James H. Doolittle Award (1979) and the Elmer A. Sperry Award (2008). Stafford received recognition from the U.S. and Russian governments, with the U.S. Congressional Space Medal of Honor (1993) and the Russian Medal "For Merit in Space Exploration" (2011).

Stafford's military decorations and awards include: the Air Force Distinguished Service Medal with two oak leaf clusters, Distinguished Flying Cross with oak leaf cluster, Air Force Commendation Medal and Air Force Outstanding Unit Award ribbon with three oak leaf clusters. Other awards presented to Stafford include: NASA Distinguished Service Medal with oak leaf cluster, NASA Exceptional Service Medal with oak leaf cluster, the American Institute of Aeronautics and Astronautics Octave Chanute Award (1976), the Veterans of Foreign Wars National Space Award, the Golden Plate Award of the American Academy of Achievement (1976), the National Geographic Society's General Thomas D. White USAF Space Trophy (1975), and the A. B. Honts Award as the outstanding graduate from the USAF Experimental Test Pilot School. He was awarded the Gold Space Medal from the Fédération Aéronautique Internationale (FAI) in 1976. FAI created an exception that allowed Leonov to be awarded it alongside him; typically the award is restricted to one person per year. The RNASA Foundation awarded him with their highest honor, the National Space Trophy, in 1993.

In 2011, Stafford was awarded the National Aeronautic Association Wright Brothers Memorial Trophy, and the Air Force Association's Lifetime Achievement Award. He was elected to the National Academy of Engineering in 2014. Stafford is an inductee of the National Aviation Hall of Fame, Oklahoma Aviation and Space Hall of Fame, International Air & Space Hall of Fame, the U.S. Astronaut Hall of Fame, and the International Space Hall of Fame. He was a fellow of the American Astronautical Society, the American Institute of Aeronautics and Astronautics, the Society of Experimental Test Pilots, and a member of the Explorers Club. In 2019, he was awarded the General James E. Hill Lifetime Space Achievement Award.

Honoraria: Stafford was the recipient of a Doctorate of Science from Oklahoma City University; a Doctorate of Laws from Western State University; a Doctorate of Communications from Emerson College, and a Doctorate of Aeronautical Engineering from Embry-Riddle Aeronautical University.

In his hometown of Weatherford, Stafford was honored with a building at Southwestern Oklahoma State University named in his honor, the Thomas P. Stafford Airport, and the Stafford Air & Space Museum. The Stafford Building at the Federal Aviation Administration (FAA) Mike Monroney Aeronautical Center in Oklahoma City is named after him. In September 2018, Stafford was depicted in a corn maze in Hydro, Oklahoma.

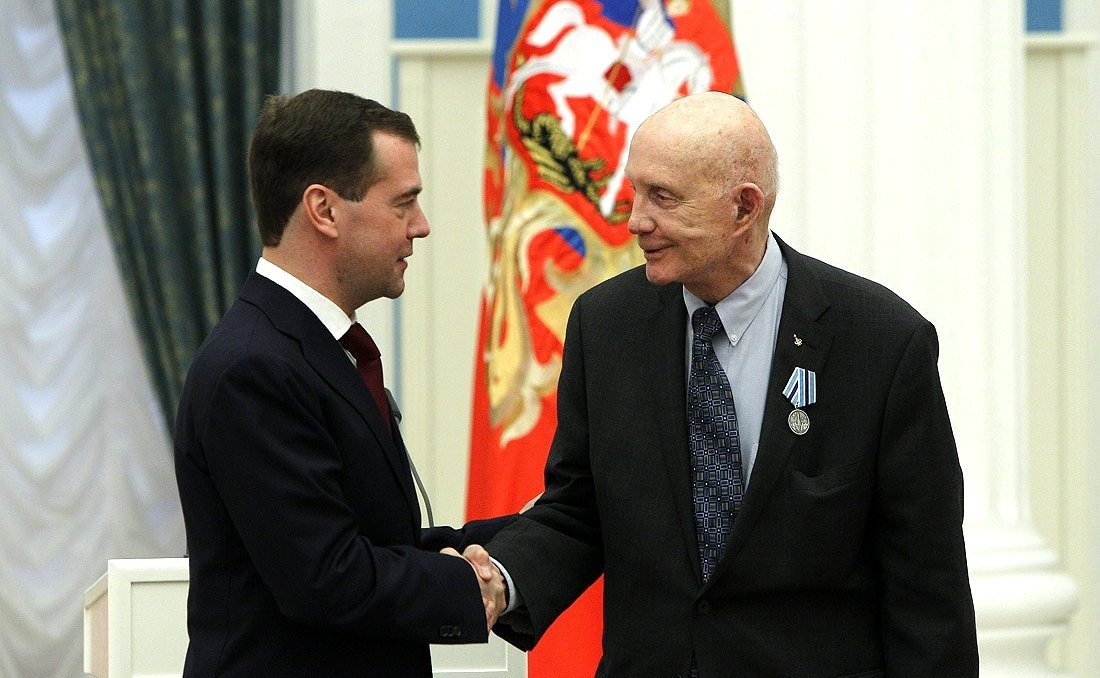
Stafford was presented with the Medal "For Merit in Space Exploration" from Russian president Dmitry Medvedev on April 12, 2011, at the Moscow Kremlin

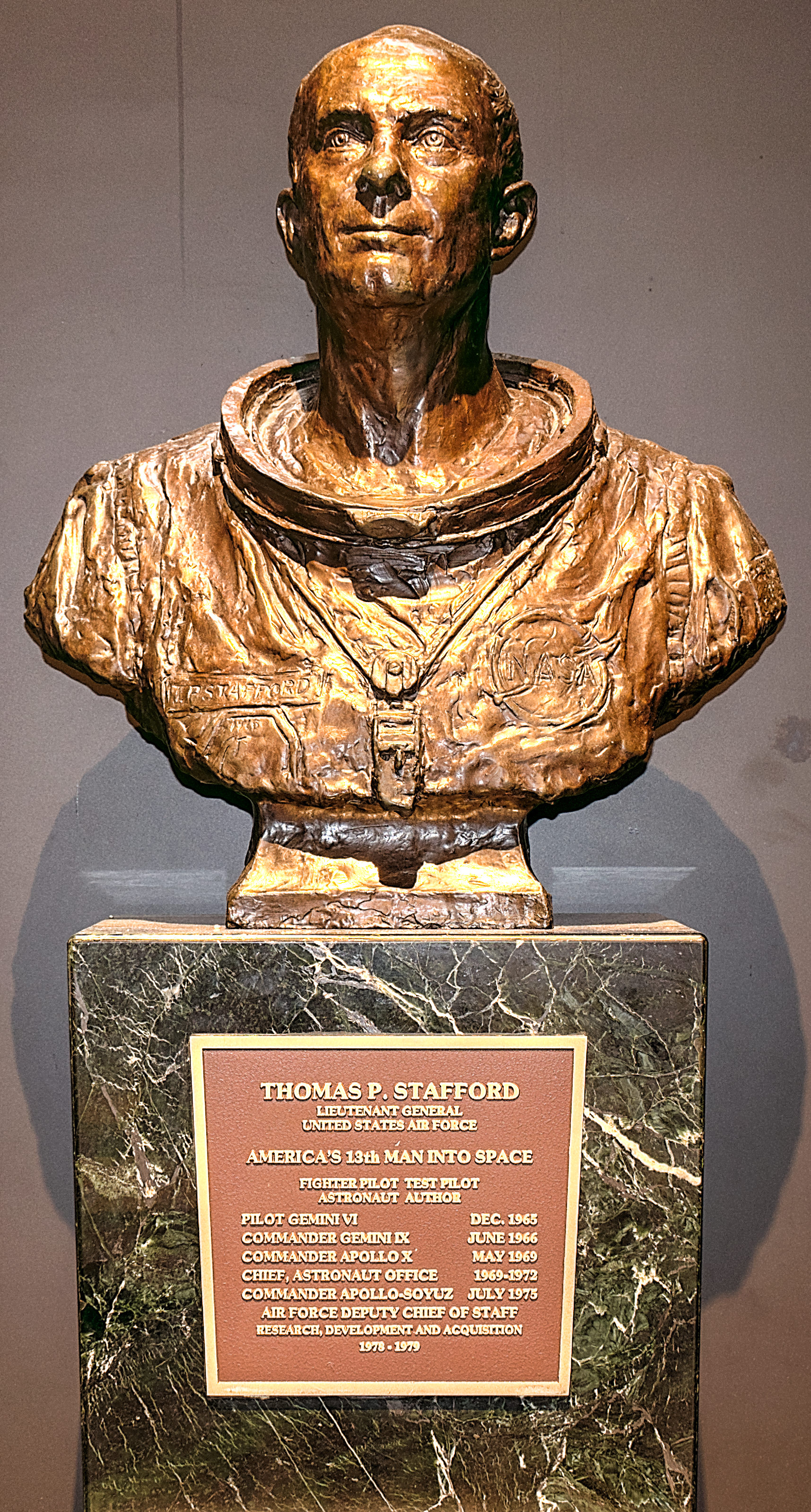
Bust of Stafford at the USAF Museum

== In media ==
- 1974 TV movie Houston, We've Got a Problem – played by himself
- 1990 album Impurity by British rock band New Model Army – quotes Stafford in the song "Space"
- 1996 TV movie Apollo 11 – was played by Tony Carlin.
- 1998 HBO miniseries From the Earth to the Moon – played by Steve Hofvendahl.
- 2013 Pilot episode of The Americans on FX, played by an uncredited actor

== See also ==
- List of spaceflight records
