= Cosmic Birth =

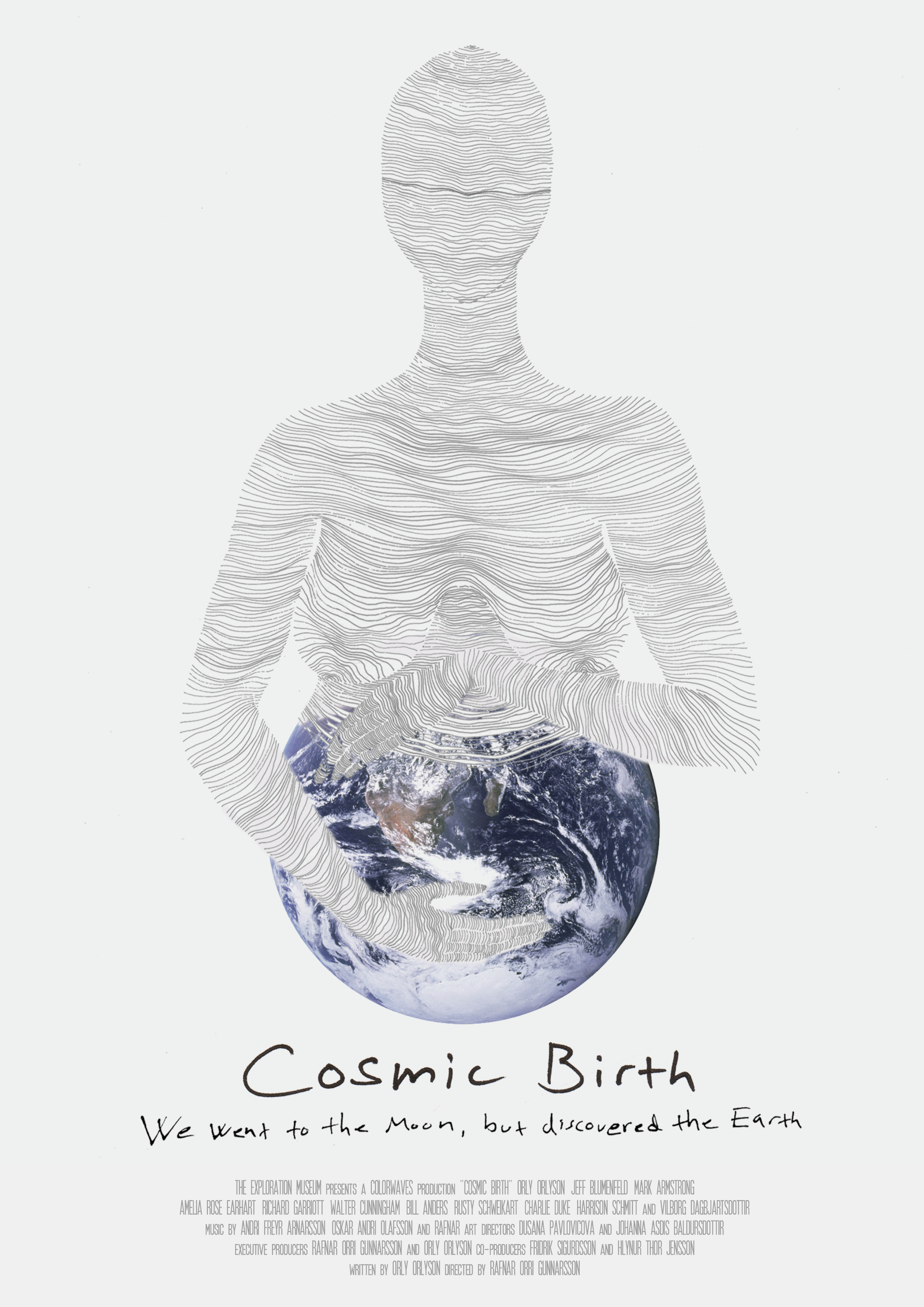
- Theatrical release poster
- Directed by: Rafnar Orri Gunnarsson; Örlygur Hnefill Örlygsson
- Written by: Örlygur Hnefill Örlygsson; Rafnar Orri Gunnarsson
- Produced by: Hlynur Þór Jensson
- Starring: Bill Anders; Charlie Duke; Harrison Schmitt; Rusty Schweickart; Walter Cunningham
- Music by: Andri Freyr Arnarsson; Óskar Andri Ólafsson
- Production companies: Colorwaves for The Exploration Museum
- Release dates: 20 July 2019 (Iceland); 15 November 2019 (US)
- Running time: 45 minutes
- Country: Iceland
- Languages: English, Icelandic

Cosmic Birth is a 2019 Icelandic documentary film about mankind's journey to the Moon and the experience of viewing the Earth from a quarter of a million miles away. The film also looks into the role that Iceland played in the training of the Apollo astronauts for the first crewed missions to another world. Cosmic Birth is written and directed by Exploration Museum founder Örlygur Hnefill Örlygsson and filmmaker and musician Rafnar Orri Gunnarsson.

== Synopsis ==
Between 1968 and 1972, twenty-four American astronauts traveled to the Moon, with twelve of them walking on its surface. Through interviews with five Apollo astronauts, as well as family members of two of the astronauts who have died, the film looks into how going to the Moon changed the astronauts, as well as how the astronauts helped people back on Earth better understand our own planet.

The film also explores the impact of the photographs coming out of NASA during the Apollo era and what role they played in helping start the environmental movement in the early 1970s. One of these photos was Earthrise, taken by Bill Anders on Apollo 8, who tells the story of his photo in Cosmic Birth. Nature photographer Galen Rowell declared Bill's photo Earthrise "the most influential environmental photograph ever taken". The film also tells the story of the training of the Apollo astronauts in Iceland in 1965 and 1967 before their lunar missions.

== Participants ==
Five Apollo astronauts appear in original interviews in Cosmic Birth; Walter Cunningham who flew on the first crewed Apollo mission, Bill Anders who along with Frank Borman and Jim Lovell was the first human to orbit the Moon, Rusty Schweickart who flew the first Lunar Module, Charlie Duke who was the youngest person to walk on the Moon, and Harrison Schmitt who was the only scientist and last person to set his foot on the Moon. Other astronauts appear in archival footage, including Neil Armstrong, whose son Mark Armstrong is interviewed in the film. Owen Garriott's son Richard Garriott who is a second generation astronaut is also interviewed.

In addition to the Apollo astronauts and their families, the film features interviews with Icelandic poet Vilborg Dagbjartsdóttir, artist Chris Calle (son of NASA artist Paul Calle), around the world pilot Amelia Rose Earhart, astrophysicist Dr. Michael Shara, and Expedition News editor Jeff Blumenfeld.

== Filming ==
The interviews with the astronauts were conducted from 2013 to 2019 in Iceland as well as in the United States. Most of the astronauts appearing in the film are interviewed both on location in the Apollo geology training areas in Iceland and in space museums and at their homes in the United States.

Filming in Iceland took place in 2013, 2015 and 2017 during the Apollo astronauts' revisits to their geology training areas.

Filming in the US took place in 2018 and 2019 at the Stafford Air & Space Museum in Weatherford, Oklahoma, at the San Diego Air & Space Museum in San Diego, California, at Cape Canaveral and Kennedy Space Center in Florida, and at the American Museum of Natural History and the Explorers Club in New York.

== Title and soundtrack ==
The musical score for Cosmic Birth was composed by Icelandic musicians Framfari and Ósi á Borg, in collaboration with the film's director Rafnar Orri Gunnarsson who is himself a musician. The soundtrack was released on vinyl and Spotify on January 10, 2020, on a full moon.

The theatrical release poster for Cosmic Birth was released on 28 May 2019 and features a pregnant woman who is Mother Earth. The art and the title of the film are a reference to a quote in the film by Apollo 9 astronaut Rusty Schweickart who compared the Apollo missions to a cosmic birth, giving us the first true view of our mother Earth. The poster is designed by artist Dušana Pavlovičová.

== Release ==
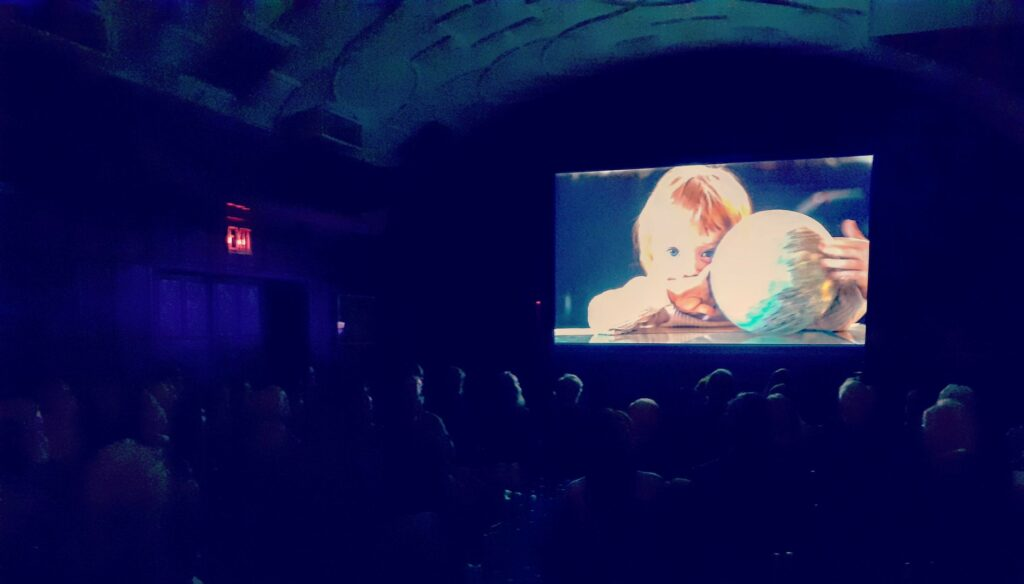
The film had its US premiere at the Explorers Club in New York City on November 15, 2019.

The film was released simultaneously in cinemas and on RÚV, the National TV of Iceland, on July 20, 2019, in celebration of the 50th anniversary of Apollo 11's first landing on the Moon. An event commemorating the historic significance of Apollo 11 took place in the documentary cinema Bíó Paradís in Reykjavík before the premiere of the film. No admission fee was charged in cinemas in Iceland but guests had to book their tickets in advance. The writers and producers of the film consider it Iceland's contribution to celebrating "humanities greatest achievement, going to another world". From October 2019, the film will screen at selected cinemas in Europe and in the US.

The film had its US premiere at the Explorers Club in New York City on November 15, 2019, followed by a Q&A moderated by private astronaut Richard Garriott.

The first trailer for the film was released on June 5, 2019.

== See also ==
- Apollo 11 in popular culture
