= Leif Erikson Awards =

Annual Icelandic award

- The Exploration Awards
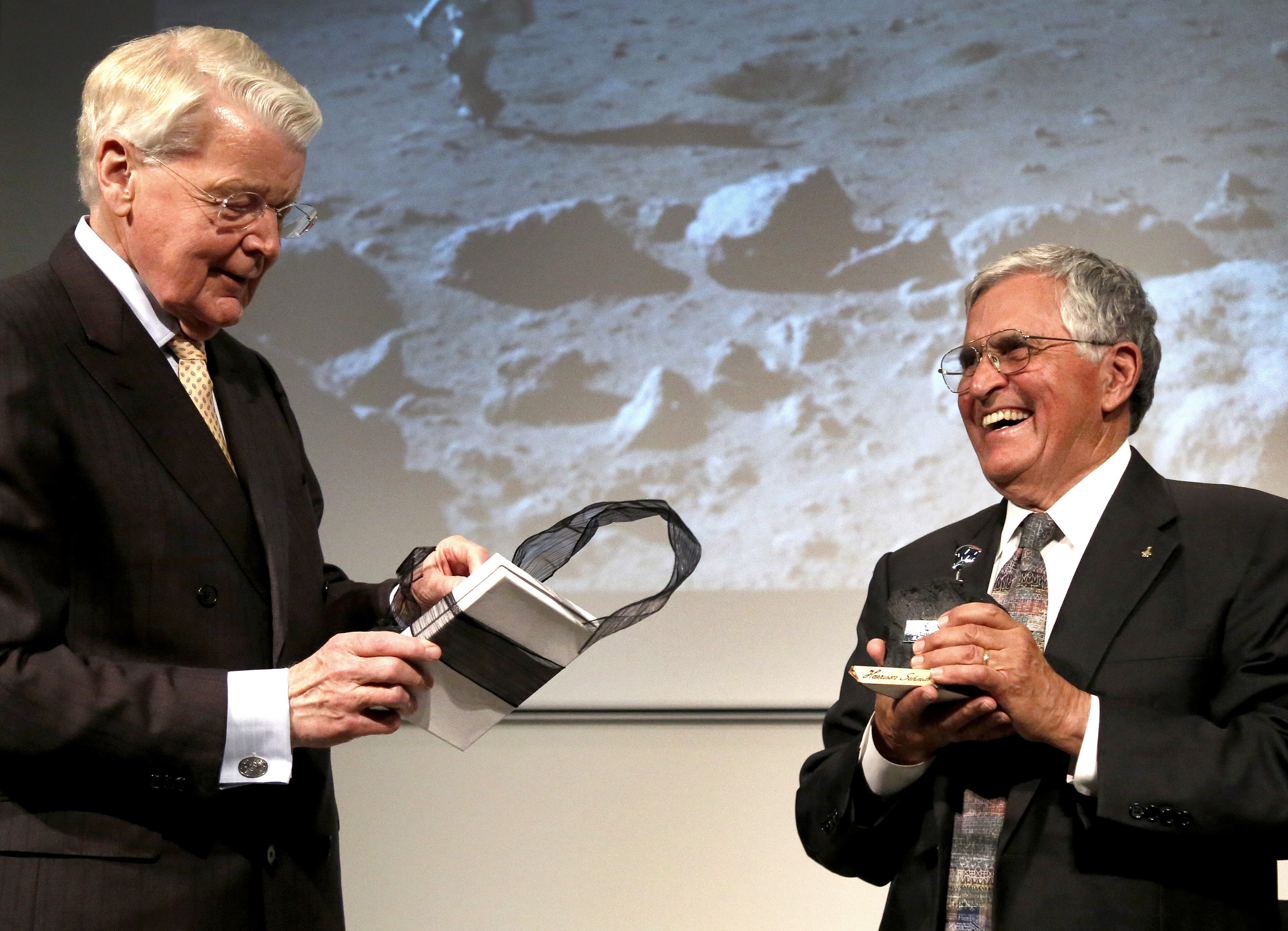
- Apollo 17 astronaut Harrison Schmitt receives the 2015 Leif Erikson award from Ólafur Ragnar Grímsson, President of Iceland.
- Awarded for: achievements in exploration and for work in the field of exploration history.
- Location: Húsavík
- Country: Iceland
- Website: explorationmuseum.com

The Leif Erikson Awards, sometimes referred to as the Exploration Awards, are awarded annually by the Exploration Museum in Húsavík, Iceland, for achievements in exploration and for work in the field of exploration history. They are awarded in three categories; to an explorer for a lifetime achievement in exploration; to a young explorer under the age of 35 for achievements in exploration; and to a person or an organization that has worked to promote and preserve exploration history.

The Leif Erikson Awards are the main and final event of the annual Húsavík Explorers Festival. They were first awarded in 2015.

The awards are named for Icelandic explorer Leif Erikson, considered as the first European to land in North America and who, according to the Sagas of Icelanders, established the first Norse settlement at Vinland, tentatively identified with the Norse L'Anse aux Meadows on the northern tip of Newfoundland in modern-day Canada.

Two former Presidents of Iceland, Guðni Th. Jóhannesson and Ólafur Ragnar Grímsson, have presented the awards.

== Scientific Committee ==
The winners of the Leif Erikson awards are voted by the members of the Exploration Museum's Scientific Committee. The committee is appointed for one year by the board of the museum, except for the chairperson, who is the winner of the previous year's Exploration History Award.

== Recipients ==
The 2015 Leif Erikson Awards were announced by the President of Iceland, Ólafur Ragnar Grímsson, on 9 July at the Reykjavík University Auditorium. The 2016 Leif Erikson Awards were announced by the President of Iceland, Guðni Th. Jóhannesson, on 22 October at the Explorers Festival in Húsavík. The 2017 Leif Erikson Awards were presented by BBC World News Anchor Babita Sharma, on 23 September at the Explorers Festival in Húsavík. The 2018 Leif Erikson Awards were presented by Around the world pilot and News Anchor Amelia Rose Earhart, on 23 September at the Explorers Festival in Húsavík. The 2019 Leif Erikson Awards were presented by Exploration Museum founder Orly Orlyson, on 19 October at the Explorers Festival in Húsavík. The 2020 Leif Erikson Awards were presented by Exploration Museum founder Orly Orlyson, on 15 August via a live-stream from the Explorers Festival in Húsavík.

Year	Award	Winner	Occupation	Nationality	Rationale	Ref.
2015	Leif Erikson Award	Harrison Schmitt	Apollo 17 astronaut	American	For his scientific work on the surface of the Moon in 1972 and for his part in the geology training of the astronauts that walked on the Moon before him	
2015	Young Explorer Award	Jessica Watson	Sailor	Australian	For completing a non-stop and unassisted southern hemisphere solo circumnavigation of the world at the age of 16	
2015	Exploration History Award	Huw Lewis-Jones	Author and historian	British	For his writings on visual culture, seafaring, polar exploration, mountaineering, and remote environments	
2016	Leif Erikson Award	Scott Parazynski	Astronaut and mountaineer	American	For his lifetime of exploration, as a veteran of five Space Shuttle flights and seven spacewalks, and as the only astronaut to have summited Mount Everest	
2016	Young Explorer Award	Tashi and Nungshi Malik	Mountaineers	Indian	For being the youngest persons, at the date, to have completed the Last Degree Explorers Grand Slam, at the age of 23. First siblings and twins to climb the Seven Summits and reach both Poles	
2016	Exploration History Award	Draken Harald Hårfagre	Crew and builders	Norwegian	For their expedition to retrace the first trans-Atlantic crossing and the Viking discovery of the New World	
2016	Social Media Award	Chris Burkard	Photographer	American	For his work as an adventure photographer	
2017	Leif Erikson Award	Edurne Pasaban	Mountaineer	Spanish	For becoming the first woman to climb all of the 14 eight-thousander peaks in the world between 2001 and 2010	
2017	Young Explorer Award	Alex Bellini	Sailor	Italian	For crossing both the Atlantic and Pacific Oceans on a rowing boat, solo, within the age of 30. It took him 227 days to cover 11,000 kilometres (6,800 mi) through the Mediterranean and the Atlantic, and he spent 294 days traversing the 18,000 kilometres (11,000 mi) through the Pacific	
2017	Exploration History Award	Haraldur Sigurðsson	Volcanologist	Icelandic	For his scientific commitment and writings on volcanology. He has carried out research on the Santorini volcano since 1975. His volcanic research also includes work on the famous eruption of Vesuvius in Italy in 79 AD, which buried Pompeii and Herculaneum	
2018	Leif Erikson Award	Clive Oppenheimer	Volcanologist	British	For his 13 field seasons investigating Mount Erebus, the most active volcano in Antarctica	
2018	Young Explorer Award	Jade Hameister	Photographer, biologist, and author	Australian	For being the youngest person in history to achieve the "polar hat-trick" skiing to the poles and crossing the Greenland icecap	
2018	Exploration History Award	Cristina Mittermeier	Photographer, biologist, and author	Mexican	For her significant literary and photography works on environmental issues and the relationship between human cultures and biodiversity	
2019	Leif Erikson Award	Carolyn Porco	Planetary scientist	American	For her 35 years of exploration of the outer Solar System, she was a member of the imaging team for the Voyager program and took part in the first exploration of the outer Solar System.	
2019	Young Explorer Award	Barbara Zangerl	Rock climber	Austrian	For her achievements in rock climbing	
2019	Exploration History Award	Ben Feist	Software engineer and historian	Canadian	For his commitment to digitizing and communicating the achievements of NASA's Apollo program to a new generation	
2019	Lunar Prize	China National Space Administration	(National space agency of China)	Chinese	For humanity's first soft landing on the far side of the Moon, on 3 January 2019. The award was accepted by Jin Zhijian, the Chinese Ambassador to Iceland	
2020	Leif Erikson Award	George Kourounis	Explorer	Greek-Canadian	For exploring and documenting extreme natural events and for documenting many forms of severe weather, including tornadoes, hurricanes, blizzards, floods, hail, and lightning	
2020	Young Explorer Award	Ulyana Horodyskyj	Glaciologist and geologist	American	For field work in the arctic and for her work as a science communicator	
2020	Exploration History Award	Jeff Blumenfeld	Author	American	For his 26-year work in documenting exploration history as the editor of Expedition News	
2020	Lunar Prize	Skyrora	(Spaceflight company)	Scottish	For their work in developing high-grade rocket fuel made from waste plastics, designed to minimize the environmental impact of rocket launches	
2021	Leif Erikson Award	Will Steger	Polar explorer and preservation advocate	American	For his lifetime of exploration of the Arctic and Antarctic, and for his tireless efforts to promote preservation of these important regions of the world.	
2021	Young Explorer Award	Belén Garcia Ovide	Marine biologist and wildlife guide	American	For her work in promoting ocean protection through exploration and citizen science	
2021	Exploration History Award	J. Robert Harris	Author	American	For his lifetime of exploration, as well as his tireless efforts to promote diversity in exploration.	
2022	Leif Erikson Award	Kathy Sullivan	Geologist, oceanographer and astronaut	American	For her lifetime of exploration for science	
2022	Young Explorer Award	Dominique Gonçalves	Ecologist	Mozambican	For her work on elephant conservation in Gorongosa National Park.	
2022	Exploration History Award	Geoff Green	Expedition leader	Canadian	For his work on polar education and youth engagement	
2023	Leif Erikson Award	Bill Anders	Astronaut	American	For his iconic photograph “Earthrise"	
2023	Young Explorer Award	Kellie Gerardi	Science communicator	American	For her pioneering work in bioastronautics research and spacesuit evaluation	
2023	Exploration History Award	Libby Jackson	Mission controller and author	British	For her work in preserving the history of female astronauts and space professionals	
2023	Lunar Prize	Indian Space Research Organisation	(National space agency of India)	Indian	For the Chandrayaan-3 mission	
2024	Leif Erikson Award	Rusty Schweickart	Astronaut	American	For pioneering work and advocacy have inspired generations of explorers and scientists.	
2024	Young Explorer Award	Nima Rinji Sherpa	Nepalese	Mountaineer	For being the youngest person to climb all 14 of the world’s 8,000-meter peaks	
2024	Exploration History Award	Space Hipsters	(online community)	–	For their dedication to preserving and promoting the history of space exploration	

== Explorers Festival ==
The Leif Erikson Awards are the main event of the annual Húsavík Explorers Festival. The festival was first held in 2015 with events in Húsavík and Reykjavík. The format of the festival took shape in 2016 and has stayed the same since, with the festival consisting of short expeditions and outdoor activities around Húsavík, young explorers workshops, talks by explorers, concerts, film screenings and art exhibitions.

== See also ==
- The Exploration Museum
- The Astronaut Monument
- List of geography awards
