= Örlygur Hnefill Örlygsson =

Icelandic museum director

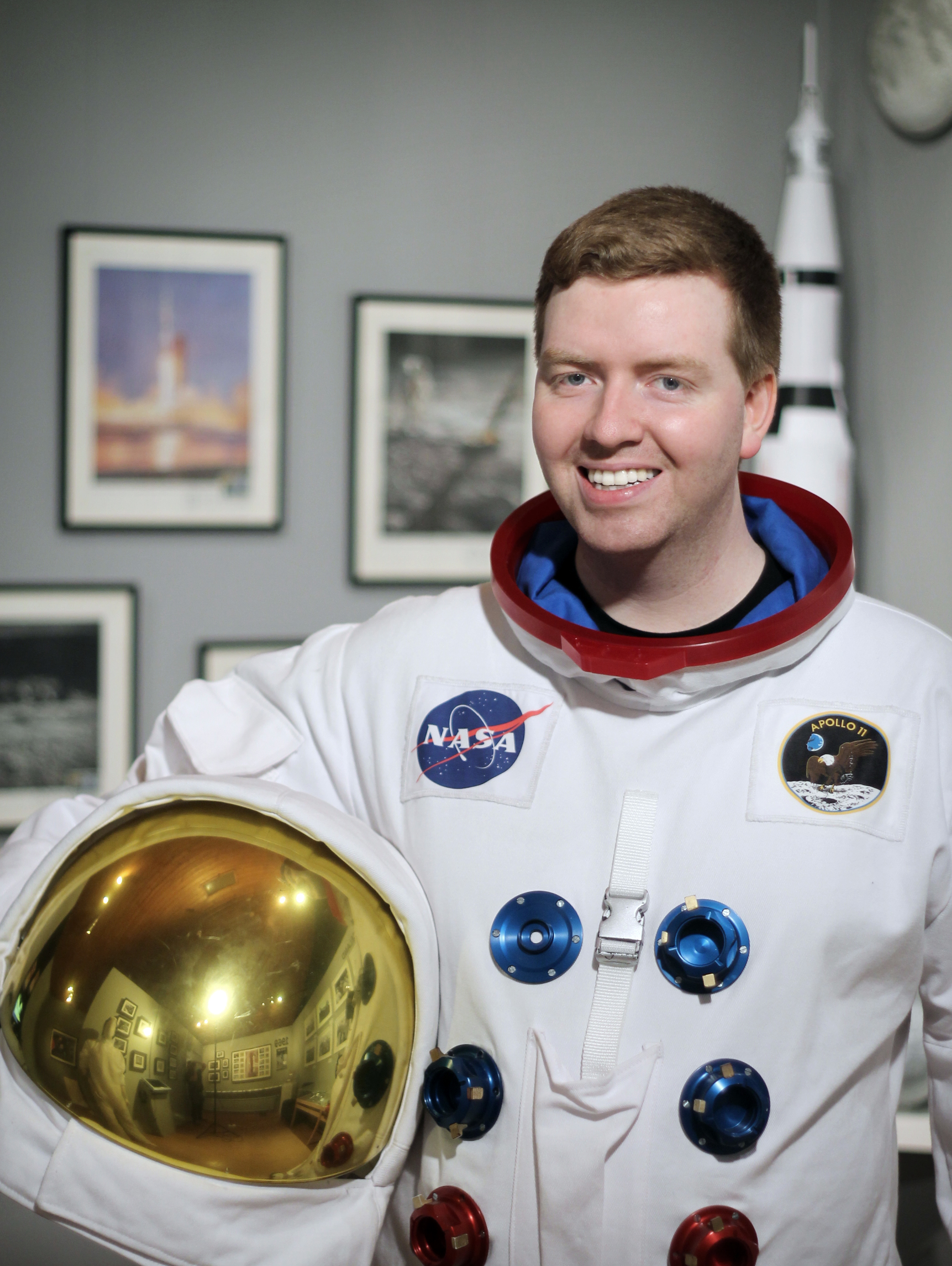
- Örlygur Hnefill wearing a replica of the Apollo spacesuit at The Exploration Museum.
- Born: October 23, 1983 (age 42); Húsavík, Iceland
- Other names: Orly Orlyson
- Occupations: Museum director Hotel manager
- Spouse: Jóhanna Ásdís Baldursdóttir
- Children: Aníta, Ylva
- Parents: Örlygur Hnefill Jónsson; Valgerður Gunnarsdóttir

Örlygur Hnefill Örlygsson (born 23 October 1983), known professionally as Orly Orlyson, is an Icelandic filmmaker, entrepreneur, hotelier, founder of The Exploration Museum and former President of the Húsavík town council.

In 2018, Örlygur was selected by the United States Department of State and the German Marshall Fund to represent Iceland in the YTILI program. That same year, he was awarded by JCI as one of Ten Outstanding Young Persons in Iceland for his various entrepreneurial projects, most notably for founding The Exploration Museum, and for co-founding the Leif Erikson Awards.

== Political career ==
From 2007 to 2009, Örlygur served as the parliamentary assistant to Einar Már Sigurðarson, member of Parliament for Northeast Constituency. From 2011 to 2016 he served as chairman of the Húsavík Chamber of Commerce and Tourism.

In May 2014, Örlygur was elected to the town council of Norðurþing municipality in northern Iceland. He served as chair of the Norðurþing Harbor Committee from 2015 to 2016 and as chairman of the regional Recycling and Waste Management Cooperative from 2014 to 2016. He has served as President of the town council since 2017.

== Work with astronauts ==
In 2015, Örlygur led an expedition with Apollo astronauts Walter Cunningham, Rusty Schweikart and Harrison Schmitt, as well as the family of Neil Armstrong, to the new lava of Holuhraun, created by fissure eruptions in 2014 and 2015. He has led similar expeditions with Apollo astronauts Bill Anders and Charlie Duke to the areas near Askja, a caldera situated in a remote part of the central highlands of Iceland where the astronauts were trained in geology in 1965 and 1967, before the Lunar missions. His work with the Apollo astronauts has been featured by the BBC, National Geographic and The Guardian.

In 2015, he co-designed a monument with his father, commemorating the part of Iceland in the Apollo program. The monument contains the names of 32 Apollo astronauts that were sent to Iceland for training, and has two steel globes on top of two basalt columns, representing the Earth and the Moon. The monument was unveiled on July 15, 2015, by the grandchildren of Apollo 11 astronaut Neil Armstrong.

During a press conference at The Exploration Museum in November 2015, Örlygur announced the museum's plan to build a full size replica of the Apollo Lunar Module to unveil in 2019, celebrating the 50th anniversary of the first crewed flight of a Lunar Module on Apollo 9 and the first landing of a Lunar Module on the Moon on Apollo 11.

Örlygur wrote and co-directed the 2019 documentary Cosmic Birth with Icelandic filmmaker and musician Rafnar Orri. For the film, they interviewed 6 Apollo astronauts about their personal experience of going to the Moon, and Neil Armstrong's son Mark Armstrong about his father's Apollo 11 mission.

== Húsavík at the 93rd Academy Awards ==
On February 9, 2021, The Academy of Motion Picture Arts and Sciences announced the shortlists for the 93rd Academy Awards. Fifteen songs were announced for the Best Original Song category. Among the songs was 'Húsavík' from the Netflix film Eurovision Song Contest: The Story of Fire Saga. Örlygur put together a team from the real town of Húsavík and produced an independent Oscar campaign for the song called "An Óskar for Húsavík" that quickly went viral. The campaign consisted of a website and several videos with locals and actors from the film. On March 9, entertainment reporter Lara Spencer called the campaign "One of the best Oscar Campaigns we have ever seen" during a segment about the campaign on ABC's Good Morning America. The song secured a nomination, and the film's director David Dobkin credited the grassroots campaign as "the reason why the song went from underdog to a possible winner".

Following the success of the Húsavík Oscar Campaign, Örlygur was asked by Netflix to produce the performance of the song 'Húsavík' for the 93rd Academy Awards. He was joined by Icelandic production company Truenorth and director Eagle Egilsson. Singer Molly Sandén who provides the singing voice for Rachel McAdams character Sigrit in the film, performed the song with a local girls choir and musicians at the Húsavík harbor. Húsavík lost to Fight For Your from the film Judas and the Black Messiah. The performance by Molly Sandén was voted the best pre-show performance by the readers of Gold Derby.

== Family ==
Örlygur is the son of Icelandic politician Valgerður Gunnarsdóttir, and the grandson of author and folklorist Jón Hnefill Aðalsteinsson.

== See also ==
- The Exploration Museum
- The Astronaut Monument
- Leif Erikson Awards
