= The Exploration Museum =

- Location within Iceland
- Established: 2011
- Location: Húsavík, Iceland
- Coordinates: 66.047859°N 17.344387°W
- Type: History museum
- Director: Örlygur Hnefill Örlygsson
- Curators: Francesco Perini and Giuditta Gubbi

The Exploration Museum (Icelandic: Könnunarsögusafnið Icelandic pronunciation: [ˈkʰœnːʏnarˌsœːɣʏˌsapnɪθ]) is dedicated to the history of human exploration, from the early explorers to the exploration of space. The museum is located in Húsavík in North Iceland, 50 kilometres (30 mi) from the Arctic Circle. The museum was founded in 2011 and formally opened in 2014 by the President of Iceland.

The main exhibition room features photographs and artifacts from the Apollo astronaut training program near Húsavík in 1965 and 1967. The second exhibition room features the history of Viking exploration. Upstairs is dedicated to the exploration of the polar regions and the races to the north and south poles. The basement details expeditions which travelled underground and beneath the sea.

== Main exhibition rooms ==
=== Apollo astronaut training in Iceland ===
The Exploration Museum opened its first exhibition in May 2011, detailing the Apollo geology training in Iceland in 1965 and 1967. The exhibition was opened 50 years after US president John F. Kennedy first announced the goal of landing a man on the Moon by the end of 1969. The geology field exercises were intended to develop the astronauts' observational skills in recognizing basic geologic structures. Over 50 photographs from the field training are in the museum's collection. In the words of Phinney, "Iceland was probably the most Moon-like of all the field areas that were visited."

In 2015, on the 50th anniversary of the first Apollo geology field trip to Iceland, the museum organized a return trip to the training area with three Apollo astronauts, Walter Cunningham of Apollo 7, Rusty Schweikart of Apollo 9, and Harrison Schmitt of Apollo 17. On the same occasion, Neil Armstrong's grandchildren unveiled The Astronaut Monument outside the museum, honoring the astronauts that trained in Iceland. The museum had previously been visited by Apollo 8 astronaut, William Anders, and SkyLab and Space Shuttle astronaut Owen Garriott.

=== Viking explorers ===
The Viking explorers exhibition details the history of Viking exploration and settlement. Among the items on display are portraits of some of the most known Viking explorers, including Leif Ericson, Erik the Red, Guðríður Þorbjarnardóttir and Garðar Svavarsson.

=== Race to the South Pole ===
The first expedition to reach the geographic South Pole was led by the Norwegian explorer Roald Amundsen. He and four others arrived at the pole in December 1911, five weeks ahead of a British party led by Robert Falcon Scott as part of the Terra Nova Expedition. Photographs from the two expedition and replicas of equipment used by the explorers are among the items on display. Amundsen and his team returned safely to their base. Scott and his four companions died on their return journey.

== Events ==
The Explorers Festival is a festival and conference on exploration, art and science, hosted by the museum. The annual four-day event consists of talks by explorers, workshops on storytelling, concerts and art exhibitions. The first edition of the festival took place in 2015, marking the 50th anniversary of the geology training of the Apollo astronaut in Iceland. During the first edition, the family of Apollo 11 commander Neil Armstrong unveiled a monument about Iceland's role in the Apollo program.

== Gallery ==
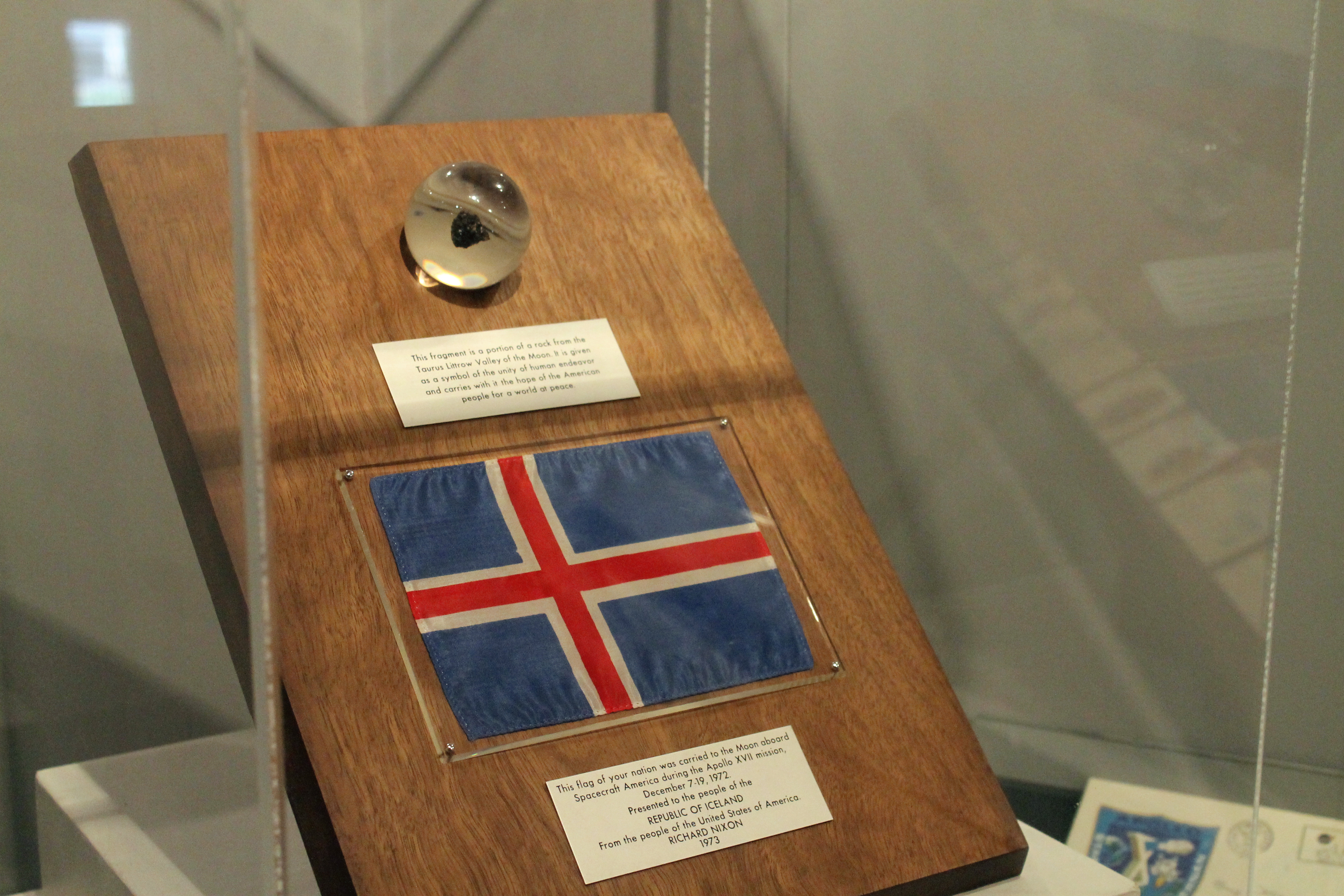
Apollo 17 Moon rock on display at The Exploration Museum.

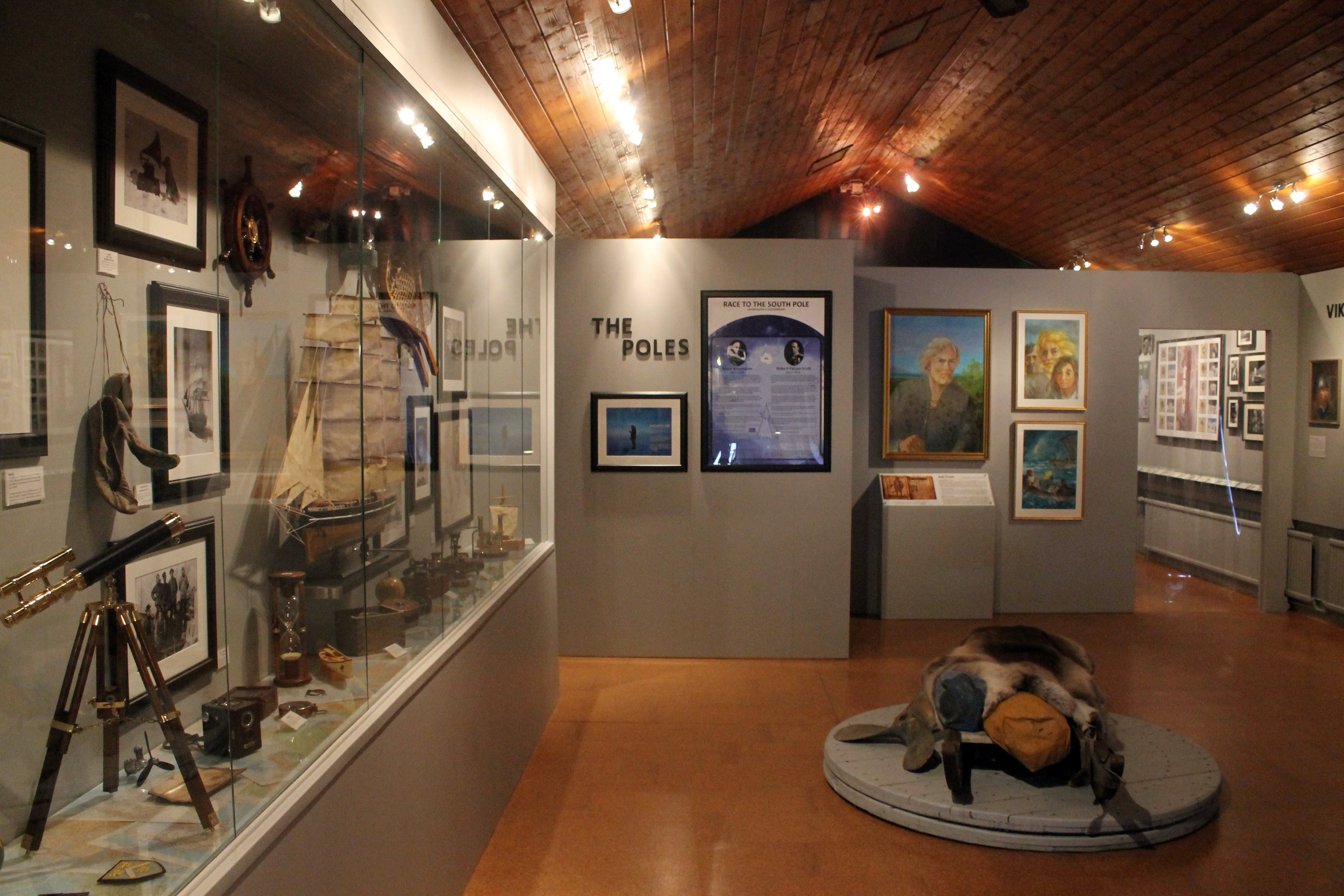
One of the exhibition rooms at The Exploration Museum.

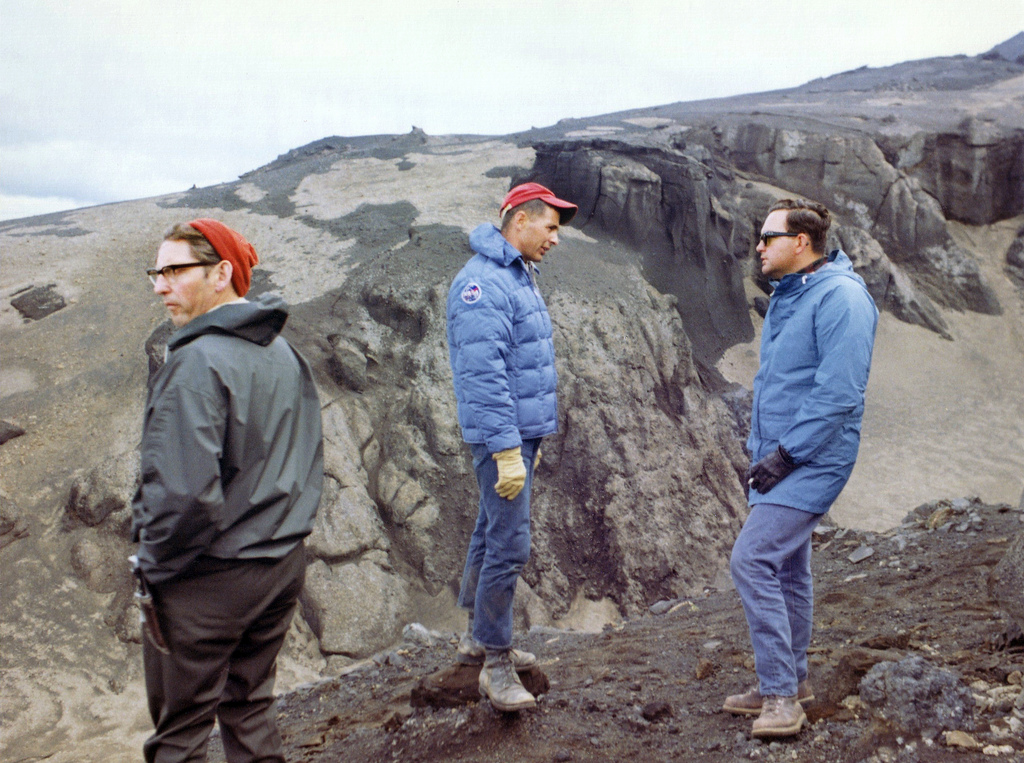
Apollo 8 astronaut Bill Anders training in Iceland in 1967.

== See also ==
- Age of Exploration
- Apollo program
- Leif Erikson Awards
- List of explorers
- List of explorations
- List of female explorers and travelers
- List of lost expeditions
