= Libby Jackson =

British space exploration expert (born 1981)

Elizabeth "Libby" Anne Jackson OBE FRAeS (born 18 March 1981) is a British space exploration expert and head of space at the Science Museum, London.

== Early life and education ==
Libby Jackson's enthusiasm for space travel started young, when, as a seven-year-old, she wrote a Travel Guide to Mars. Aged fifteen she attended Space School, before choosing A-Levels in Physics, Maths, Further Maths and Music. She developed an interest in human spaceflight aged seventeen, after shadowing a flight director at NASA Johnson Space Center. She went on to complete a BSc in physics at Imperial College London in 2002 and an MSc in Astronautics and Space Engineering at Cranfield University in 2003.

== Career ==
After graduating from Cranfield, Jackson worked as a graduate engineer at EADS Astrium. From 2007, Libby Jackson worked at Europe's control centre for the International Space Station (ISS) as a flight instructor and controller at the Columbus Control Centre. She became director for the ISS European Space Agency (ESA) Columbus Module in 2010. Jackson joined the UK Space Agency in 2014 and became spokesperson for Tim Peake's mission to the ISS. In 2016 and 2018, Jackson spoke at the National Student Space Conference, hosted by UK Students for the Exploration and Development of Space (UKSEDS), the UK's national student space society. She coordinated the UK Space Agency education and outreach programme for Peake's mission. She previously managed the Human Exploration Programme at the UK Space Agency, representing the UK's interest in human spaceflight and microgravity, and became its Head of Space Exploration.

In 2019 she was awarded an honorary Doctor of Science degree by the University of Kent. In 2023 she was awarded an Order of the British Empire "for services to the Space Sector" in the New Year Honours, and also the Leif Erikson Exploration History Award for "her tireless efforts in preserving the history of female astronauts and space professionals".

In 2025, Jackson became the first "Head of Space" for the Science Museum, London, responsible for science communication and engagement, and supporting curators.

== Public engagement and outreach ==
Jackson works to improve the public perception of space science and engineering, contributing to mainstream media and speaking at large events. In 2016, Jackson ran the London Marathon in an astronaut costume, whilst at the same event, Tim Peake became the first male to run a marathon in space. She was part of the team awarded the Sir Arthur Clarke Award from the British Interplanetary Society in 2016 for the outreach activities surrounding Tim Peake's Principia Mission. Her first book, A Galaxy of Her Own, was published in 2017. Her second book, Space Explorers, was published in 2020.
