= Bíó Paradís =

Cinema in Reykjavík, Iceland

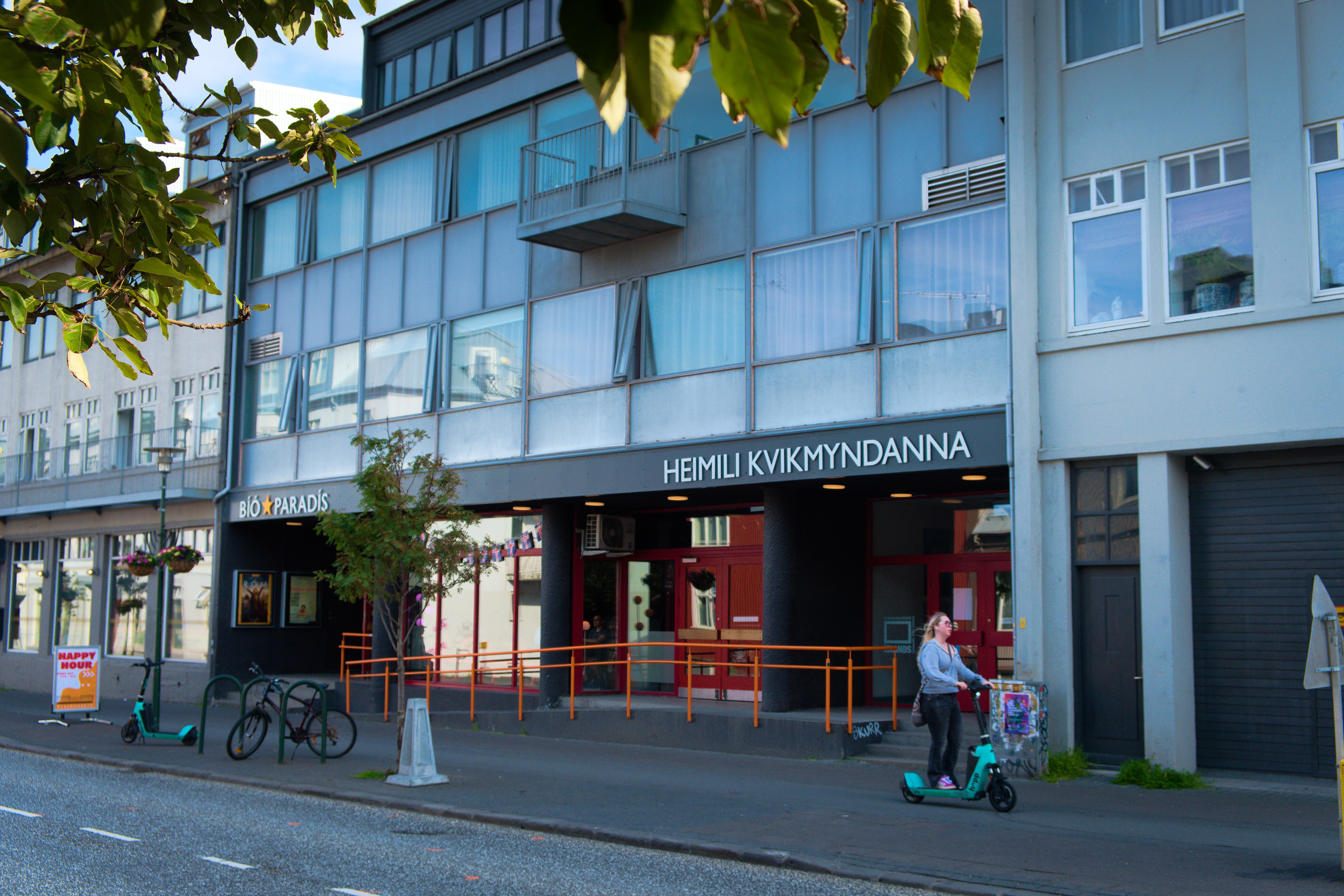
- Interactive map of Bíó Paradís
- Address: Hverfisgata 54; Reykjavík; Iceland
- Coordinates: 64.14573416605539°N 21.925948487887634°W

Construction
- Opened: 15 September 2010

Website
- bioparadis.is

Bíó Paradís is a cinema located at Hverfisgata 54 in central Reykjavík. Before its inception there was the cinema Regnboginn which was the first multiplex cinema in Reykjavík. Bíó Paradís mainly shows films that general cinemas do not show, such as documentaries and films in other languages other than English, as well as also hosting film events such as the Reykjavík International Film Festival and the Reykjavík International Childrens Film Festival. The cinema was opened on 15 September 2010 with the showing of the documentary Backyard by Árna Sveinsson. The cinema is managed by the non-profit organization Heimili kvikmyndanna ses, which is supported by various professional filmmaking associations. The cinema is a member of the European cinema network, Europa Cinemas.

Bíó Paradís laid off all its employees at the end of January 2020 and was planning to close the cinema on 1 May. The reason was to a three- to four-fold increase in the rental price of the property, which was before been under market price due to its underuse. On 2 July 2020 it was however announced that the agreement would had been reached with the homeowners and that the cinema would reopen in September of the same year.
