= William Anders =

American astronaut (1933–2024)

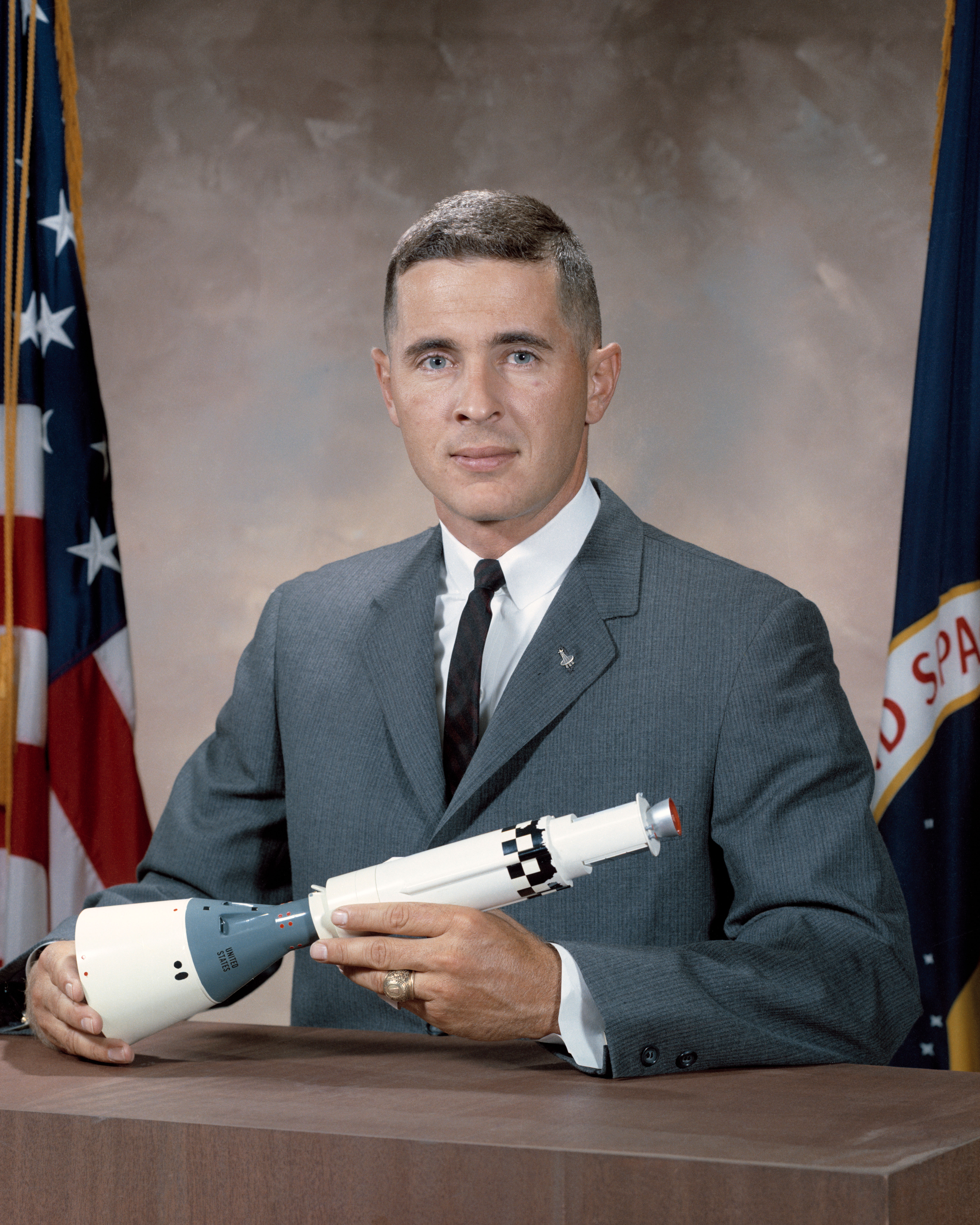
- Anders in 1964
- Born: William Alison Anders; 17 October 1933; Hong Kong
- Died: 7 June 2024 (aged 90); San Juan County, Washington, U.S.
- Resting place: United States Naval Academy Cemetery
- Education: United States Naval Academy (BS); Air University (MS)
- Spouse: Valerie E. Hoard (m. 1955)
- Children: 6
- Awards: Air Force Distinguished Service Medal; NASA Distinguished Service Medal
- Space career

NASA astronaut
- Rank: Major general, U.S. Air Force Reserve
- Time in space: 6 days, 3 hours
- Selection: NASA Group 3 (1963)
- Mission: Apollo 8
- Retired: 1 September 1969

United States Ambassador to Norway
- In office 11 May 1976 – 18 June 1977
- President: Gerald Ford; Jimmy Carter
- Preceded by: Thomas Byrne
- Succeeded by: Louis A. Lerner

William Alison Anders (17 October 1933 – 7 June 2024) was a United States Air Force major general, electrical engineer, nuclear engineer, NASA astronaut, and businessman. In December 1968, he was a member of the crew of Apollo 8, the first three people to leave low Earth orbit and travel to the Moon. Along with fellow astronauts Frank Borman and Jim Lovell, he circled the Moon ten times, and broadcast live images and commentary back to Earth, including the Christmas Eve Genesis reading. During one of the mission's lunar orbits, he took the iconic Earthrise photograph.

A 1955 graduate of the United States Naval Academy, Anders was commissioned a second lieutenant in the USAF the same year and became a fighter pilot flying Northrop F-89 Scorpions equipped with AIR-2A nuclear-tipped air-to-air rockets. In 1962, he earned a Master of Science degree in nuclear engineering at the Air Force Institute of Technology (AFIT) of Air University, and was sent to the Air Force Weapons Laboratory to manage the technical aspects of the service's nuclear reactor programs.

Anders was the executive secretary of the National Aeronautics and Space Council from 1969 to 1973, a commissioner of the United States Atomic Energy Commission from 1973 to 1975, and chairman of the Nuclear Regulatory Commission from 1975 to 1976. He then became the United States Ambassador to Norway from 1976 to 1977. In September 1977, he joined General Electric (GE) as the vice president and general manager of its Nuclear Products Division and became the general manager of the GE Aircraft Equipment Division in 1980. He left GE to join Textron as executive vice president for aerospace, and two years later became senior executive vice president for operations. During his time in the civil service, he remained a USAF reserve officer and retained his active flight status. He retired from the reserve as a major general in 1988. In 1990, he became vice chairman of General Dynamics, and in 1991 its chairman and CEO. He retired as CEO in 1993 and as chairman in 1994.

Anders died in a crash of his Beechcraft T-34 Mentor in June 2024 near the San Juan Islands.

== Early life ==
William Alison Anders was born in British Hong Kong on 17 October 1933, the son of Arthur Ferdinand Anders (1903–2000), a United States Navy lieutenant, and his wife, Muriel A. Anders (née Adams; 1911–1990). The family moved from Hong Kong to Annapolis, Maryland, where his father taught mathematics at the U.S. Naval Postgraduate School. After Annapolis, Anders's father received orders to billet in Nanjing, China. After the family moved there, the Second Sino-Japanese War erupted in 1937, followed by Japan invading China. In December of that year, his father was serving as the executive officer of the river gunboat USS Panay when he was wounded as the ship was attacked and sunk by Japanese bombers. As the Japanese began to advance toward Nanjing, Anders and his mother fled by taking a train to Guangzhou.

From the porch of the Guangzhou hotel in which they stayed, they could see Japanese aircraft bombing ships on the Pearl River 200 yards (180 m) away. This was ominous since the river was their only means of escape. In addition to the threat of Japanese aircraft, the river was mined and there was the danger of being boarded by bandits. Foreigners were allocated special areas on the boat and separated from Chinese people by barbed wire. They eventually reached the Philippines, where they awaited news of his father. Arthur Anders was rescued by the British and sent to San Diego Naval Hospital to recover from his wounds and a staphylococcal infection. He was awarded the Purple Heart and the Navy Cross but was discharged from the Navy owing to his wounds. He was recalled to active duty during World War II.

The family returned to the United States, where Anders was active in the Boy Scouts, achieving the organization's second-highest rank, Life Scout. As a teen, Anders attended St Martin's Academy and Grossmont High School in El Cajon, California. To improve his grades so that he could be accepted at the United States Naval Academy in Annapolis, Maryland, Anders was sent to the Boyden School, a military academy prep school in downtown San Diego. He commuted to Boyden by bus from La Mesa, California. The school lay under the flight path into Lindbergh Field and aircraft such as the huge Convair B-36 Peacemaker would fly low over the school. He was fascinated with flight and built model aircraft. He graduated from Boyden in 1951.

== United States Air Force ==
Anders received an appointment to Annapolis, following in the footsteps of his father, who had graduated in the Class of 1927. Part of the course was orientation cruises during which midshipmen could experience life at sea. A cruise aboard an aircraft carrier convinced him that he did not want to become a naval aviator, for there were too many fatal accidents. He graduated in 1955 with a Bachelor of Science degree in electrical engineering, and was commissioned a second lieutenant in the United States Air Force (USAF). (Note: A 1949 agreement allowed up to 25 percent of the graduating classes of West Point and Annapolis to volunteer for the Air Force. Between 1950, when the agreement became effective, and 1959, when the first class graduated from the United States Air Force Academy, about 3,200 West Point cadets and Annapolis midshipmen chose to do so.)

While at Annapolis, he had met Valerie Elizabeth Hoard on a blind date. Midshipmen were not allowed to marry, but they were married soon after he graduated. They would have six children: Alan (born in 1957), Glen (1958), Gayle (1960), Gregory (1962), Eric (1964) and Diana (1972).

After graduation, Anders reported for flight training, which was conducted in the piston-engine Beechcraft T-34 Mentor and North American T-28 Trojan and then in the jet Lockheed T-33 Shooting Star. After receiving his pilot wings in 1956 he became a fighter pilot with the 84th Fighter-Interceptor Squadron, an all-weather interceptor squadron of the Air Defense Command based at Hamilton Air Force Base in California, flying Northrop F-89 Scorpions equipped with MB-1 nuclear-tipped air-to-air rockets. He then served with the 57th Fighter-Interceptor Squadron in Iceland, where he participated in intercepts of Soviet heavy bombers, which were challenging America's air defense borders. After a year he returned to the 84th Fighter-Interceptor Squadron at Hamilton, which was now flying the McDonnell F-101 Voodoo.

Anders set his sights on becoming a test pilot. He spoke to Chuck Yeager, who recommended that he first obtain an advanced degree. Anders submitted an application to the Air Force Institute of Technology (AFIT) at Wright-Patterson Air Force Base in Ohio, hoping to study aeronautical engineering, but the Aircraft Nuclear Propulsion program was ongoing, and the AFIT had him study nuclear engineering instead. While there he took a course in aeronautical engineering at Ohio State University. He graduated from the AFIT with a Master of Science degree in nuclear engineering in 1962. By that time, the Aircraft Nuclear Propulsion program had been canceled, so he was assigned to the Air Force Weapons Laboratory at Kirtland Air Force Base in New Mexico, where he was responsible for the technical management of nuclear reactor programs.

== NASA ==
=== Selection and training ===
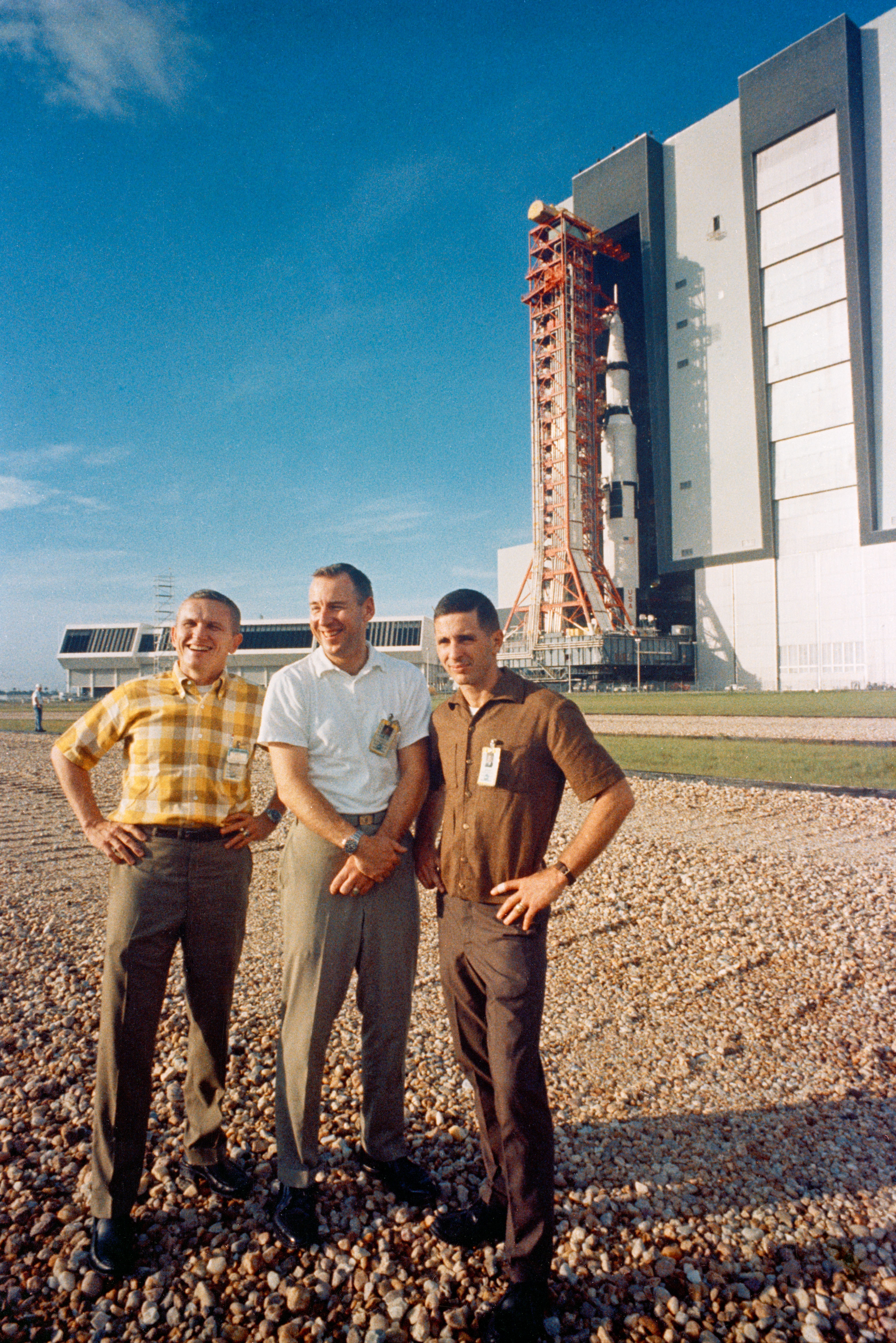
Anders (right) with fellow Apollo 8 crewmates Jim Lovell (center) and Frank Borman (left)

Anders then applied to the USAF Aerospace Research Pilots School (ARPS) for test pilot training, but on 5 June 1963, the National Aeronautics and Space Administration (NASA) announced that it would be recruiting ten to fifteen new astronauts for Project Gemini and Project Apollo, and Anders decided to apply for that too. In two previous astronaut selections, applicants had to be test pilots, but this time it was preferred but not required, making Anders eligible. He was one of the 34 finalists chosen for interviews, and on his birthday, 17 October 1963, he was informed by Mercury Seven astronaut Deke Slayton that he had been accepted as a member of the third group of NASA astronauts. Three days later, Yeager informed him that he had failed to make the cut for the ARPS but recommended that he apply again the following year.

While at NASA, he became involved in dosimetry, radiation effects, and environmental controls. In September 1966, he was the backup pilot for the Gemini 11 mission, with Neil Armstrong as the backup commander. This would have put him in line to fly a Gemini 13 mission, but no such mission was flown; Project Gemini ended with Gemini 12. Armstrong and Anders then became the first astronauts to fly the Lunar Landing Training Vehicle. The astronauts in his group without test pilot training—Anders, Roger B. Chaffee, Walter Cunningham, Rusty Schweickart, Gene Cernan, and Buzz Aldrin—were assigned to Apollo crews as the Lunar Module pilot (LMP), the lowest-ranking crew member.

=== Apollo 8 ===
The Apollo 8 1968 Christmas Eve broadcast and reading from the Book of Genesis while in lunar orbit

On 22 December 1966, Anders was assigned to the third Apollo mission, which was to be commanded by Frank Borman, with command module pilot (CMP) Michael Collins; Neil Armstrong, Jim Lovell and Buzz Aldrin were assigned as their backup crew the following year. Collins was replaced by Lovell in July 1968, after suffering a cervical disc herniation that required surgery to repair. The mission, scheduled for December 1968, was intended to be a second test of the Apollo Lunar Module (LM) in medium Earth orbit, but the delivery of the LM fell behind schedule, and when it arrived at the Kennedy Space Center (KSC) in June 1968, more than a hundred significant defects were discovered. There was no prospect of it being ready to fly in 1968. In August 1968, there were reports, including one from the CIA, that the Soviet Union was planning a crewed circumlunar mission before the end of the year.

Although the LM would not be ready to fly in December 1968, the Apollo command and service module (CSM) would be, so a CSM-only mission could be flown. It could be sent to the Moon, entering lunar orbit before returning to Earth. Slayton asked James McDivitt, the designated commander of the second mission, if he still wanted to fly it. McDivitt turned it down; his crew had spent a great deal of time preparing to test the LM, and that was what he still wanted to do. When Borman was asked the same question, he answered "yes" without any hesitation. Slayton then decided to swap the crews and spacecraft, so Borman, Lovell, and Anders's mission became Apollo 8. Anders was less enthusiastic about being the Lunar Module pilot of a mission without a Lunar Module.

According to Borman:

Rookie Bill Anders was thirty-five, slightly built, a devout Roman Catholic, and very serious minded. I'm not sure he ever got used to my rough sense of humor or Lovell's free-wheeling spirit. But Anders was one hell of a worker, a superb technician and all in all a great guy. Anders was always friendly and cooperative, but he avoided the usual astronaut bull sessions. Some of the guys regarded him as a younger version of Frank Borman in his single-minded concentration on work, his aversion to unnecessary conversation.

==== Earthrise ====
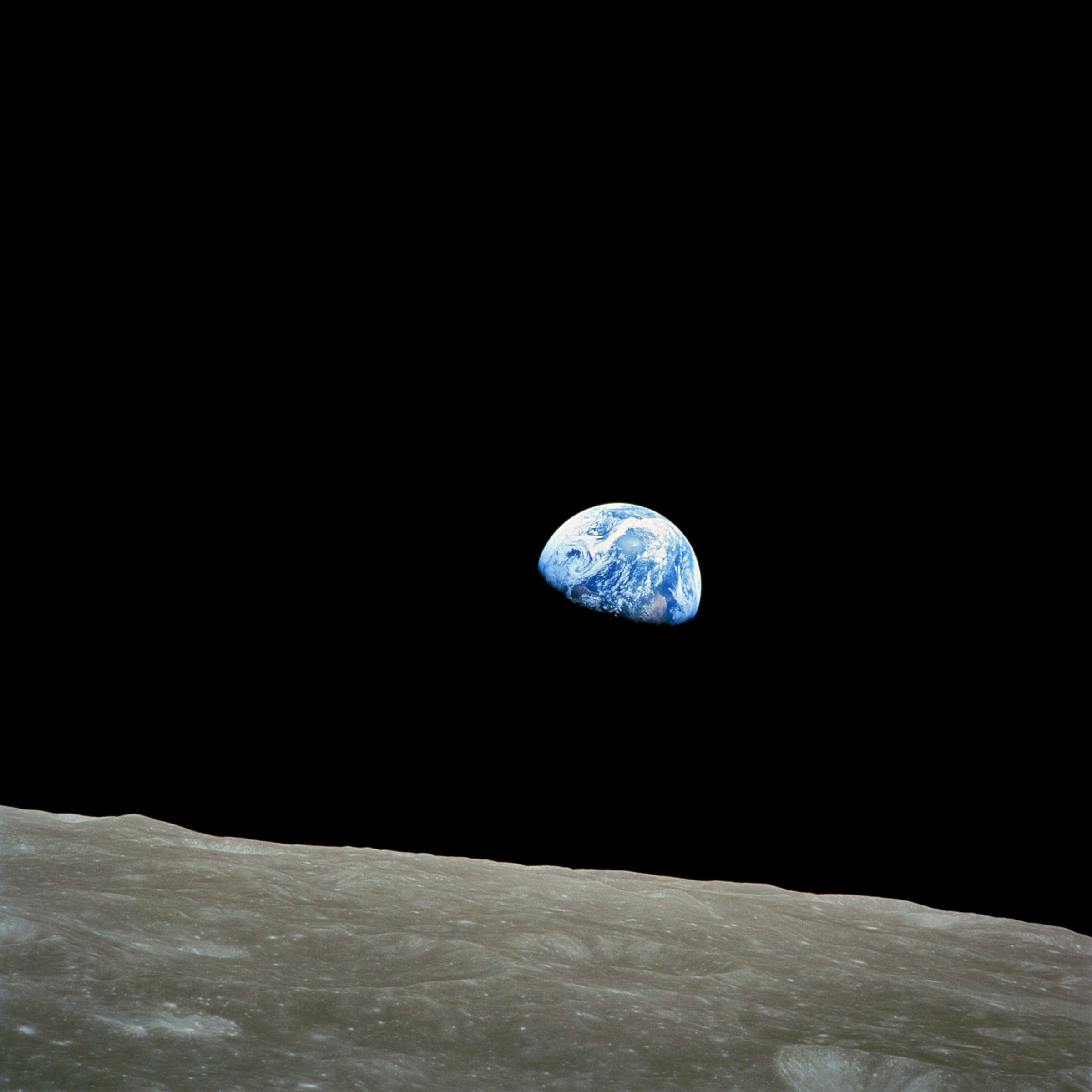
Earthrise, taken by Anders on 24 December 1968

In December 1968, Anders flew on the Apollo 8 mission, the first mission where humans traveled beyond low Earth orbit, and the first crewed flight to reach and orbit the Moon. When the spacecraft came out from behind the Moon for its fourth pass across the front, the crew witnessed an "Earthrise" for the first time in human history. (NASA's earlier uncrewed Lunar Orbiter 1 had taken the first picture of an Earthrise from the vicinity of the Moon, on 23 August 1966.)

Anders saw the Earth emerging from behind the lunar horizon and called in excitement to the others, taking a black-and-white photograph as he did so. Anders asked Lovell for color film and then took Earthrise, which was later picked by Life magazine as one of its hundred photos of the century. Anders reflected on the lasting impact of the Earthrise photograph, noting that it gained iconic status over time and helped people realize the need to take care of our fragile planet. He remarked on the photograph's message for humanity, highlighting the contrast between our only home and the conflicts, including nuclear threats and terrorism, that we face. "It amazes me." According to Anders:

We came all this way to explore the Moon, and the most important thing is that we discovered the Earth.

On conservation of the planet, he said:

If you can imagine yourself in a darkened room with only one clearly visible object, a small blue-green sphere about the size of a Christmas-tree ornament, then you can begin to grasp what the Earth looks like from space. I think that all of us subconsciously think that the Earth is flat ... Let me assure you that, rather than a massive giant, it should be thought of as the fragile Christmas-tree ball which we should handle with considerable care.

The Apollo 8 command module splashed down in the Pacific Ocean on 27 December after a flight lasting 147 hours and 42 seconds and a voyage of 504,006 nautical miles (933,419 km). It landed just 2 nautical miles (3.7 km) from the recovery ship, the aircraft carrier USS Yorktown. Due to time dilation, the three astronauts had aged about 150 microseconds less than people back on Earth (this is due to the "twins paradox" slowing time by ~300 microseconds [Special Relativity] and the lower gravity speeding up time by ~150 microseconds [General Relativity]).

=== Apollo 11 ===
The July 1969 Apollo 11 mission was commanded by Armstrong, with Collins as the CMP and Aldrin as the LMP. The Apollo 8 crew became its backup, but without Borman. Lovell stepped up to become the backup commander, and Anders became the backup CMP, with rookie astronaut Fred Haise as the backup LMP.

== NASC, AEC, and NRC ==
Anders could see that Project Apollo was coming to a close and felt that his chances of commanding a Moon mission were slim. On 16 May 1969, President Richard Nixon nominated him to become the executive secretary of the National Aeronautics and Space Council (NASC). This was the highest government post ever offered to an astronaut up to that time. He was confirmed by the United States Senate on 19 June. The Space Council consisted of the Administrator of NASA, the Chairman of the Atomic Energy Commission (AEC), and the Secretaries of State, Defense, and Transportation, and was chaired by the Vice President. Due to his commitment to the Apollo 11 backup crew, Anders was unable to assume the position until August.

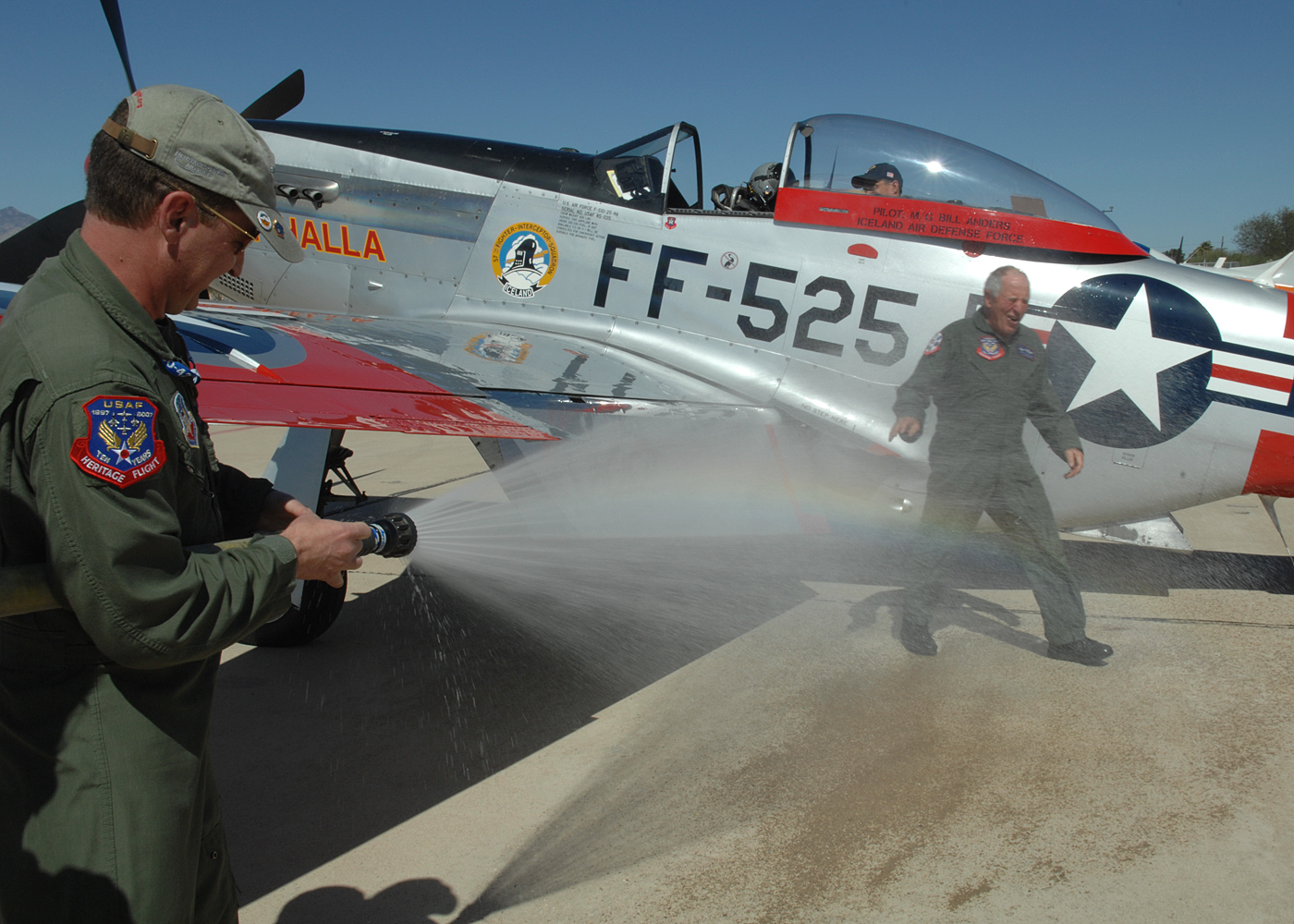
Anders sprayed with a fire hose by his son Greg at Davis–Monthan Air Force Base in 2008

In his new role, Anders was responsible for developing aeronautical and space policy. He worked closely with the Office of Science and Technology (OST) and the Office of Management and Budget (OMB) and became a personal advisor to the OMB director, Caspar Weinberger. Anders worked hard to bridge the gap between OMB and OST on the one hand and NASA on the other. He became increasingly pessimistic about the future of the NASC and the space program generally. He opposed the development of the Space Shuttle, urging instead that NASA concentrate on developing the Skylab space station. He argued that a small Space Shuttle would be a better option than a large one, but the large one was approved because it would involve more jobs in California. Frustrated with the NASC's lack of influence, he recommended in 1972 that it be abolished. This was done on 30 June 1973.

Nixon was impressed by Anders and wanted to retain him in the administration. On 6 August 1973, he appointed Anders to the five-member AEC. Nixon felt that the commission was dominated by lawyers and he wanted an engineer on it. The chairman of the AEC, Dixy Lee Ray, appointed Anders to be the lead commissioner for nuclear and non-nuclear power research and development. He also served as the U.S. chairman of the joint US-Soviet Union nuclear fission and fusion power technology exchange program. He spent much of his time dealing with the AEC's problematic research and development programs, particularly the troubled breeder reactor program.

One issue that had dogged the AEC since its inception was its dual role in both developing nuclear energy and regulating it. The perception that there was a conflict of interest between the two roles became acute with the growth of the nuclear power industry. On 19 January 1975, the commission was split in two, with its research and development responsibilities assumed by the Energy Research and Development Administration (ERDA), and its regulatory ones by the Nuclear Regulatory Commission (NRC). Some 1,970 former employees of the AEC joined the NRC. President Gerald Ford appointed Anders as the first chairman of the NRC. He was the only one of the five AEC commissioners to transition to one of the new organizations. Anders made the decision process of the commissioners of the NRC more transparent than that of the AEC. The NRC inherited nuclear safety and environmental compatibility functions from the AEC, but unlike the AEC's regulatory branch, the NRC had its own safety and security research capability, so it was not reliant on the ERDA.

After his term as NRC chairman, Anders was asked if he would be interested in an ambassadorship. He did not want to, but asked his wife Valerie. She expressed an interest in Norway, based on their trip there during the Apollo 8 world publicity tour, so Anders asked if Norway was available. Lawrence Eagleburger submitted his name for the position. Anders was appointed United States Ambassador to Norway on 13 April 1976 and held that post until 18 June 1977.

== Private sector ==
Anders served briefly as a fellow of the American Enterprise Institute. In September 1977, he joined General Electric (GE) as its vice president and general manager of its Nuclear Products Division. Based in San Jose, California, Anders was responsible for the fuel, equipment, and instrumentation used in its boiling water reactors in San Jose and Wilmington, North Carolina. He also oversaw GE's partnership with Chicago Bridge & Iron Company, which manufactured large steel pressure vessels in Memphis, Tennessee. In August 1979, GE sent him to Harvard Business School to attend its six-week Advanced Management Program. On 1 January 1980, he became the general manager of the GE Aircraft Equipment Division. From its headquarters in Utica, New York, the division controlled more than 8,500 employees in five locations in the northeastern United States. Its products included aircraft flight and weapon control systems, cockpit instruments, aircraft electrical generating systems, airborne radars and data processing systems, electronic countermeasures, space command systems, and aircraft/surface multi-barrel armament systems.

In 1984, Anders left GE to join Textron as its executive vice president for aerospace. Two years later he became senior executive vice president for operations, but Anders did not get along well with the CEO. A perk of the job was that he got to fly Bell helicopters, as Bell was a subsidiary of Textron. During his time in the civil service, Anders had remained in the Air Force as a reservist and had retained his active flight status flying NASA Northrop T-38 Talon aircraft and helicopters, retiring from the reserves as a major general in 1988. He was also a consultant to the U.S. Office of Science and Technology Policy, and a member of the Defense Science Board and the NASA Advisory Council.

=== General Dynamics board ===
Anders became vice chairman of General Dynamics in January 1990, and on 1 January 1991, its chairman and CEO. Soon after he took over as CEO, the company lost $700 million (equivalent to $1.7 billion in 2025) in write-offs over the canceled A-12 Avenger II program. The January 1991 cancelation directly caused about 3,500 employees to be laid-off at the Fort Worth, Texas plant that built the A-12. On 19 June 1991, Anders announced that General Dynamics was moving its corporate headquarters from St. Louis, Missouri, to Falls Church, Virginia, to be closer to its military customers at The Pentagon. The move started on 20 December 1991, with 110 of the 275 headquarters employees moving to the Washington Beltway location, and 50 remaining in the accounting office in St. Louis, leaving 115 unemployed.

When Anders took over, General Dynamics was in financial trouble. The quarter before he became chairman and CEO was the worst in the company's history, losing $858 million (equivalent to $2 billion in 2025) between October and December 1990. Anders sold off assets worth nearly $3 billion (equivalent to $6.9 billion in 2025), including the missile-systems business and the subsidiary of Cessna. On 9 December 1992, he sold the military aircraft division, which made the F-16 jet fighter, to the Lockheed Corporation for $1.5 billion (equivalent to $3.4 billion in 2025). These selloffs reduced the number of employees from 98,600 to around 35,000, and the company's debt from $430 million (equivalent to $900 million in 2025) to $183 million (equivalent to $400 million in 2025). GD shareholders received $600 million in dividends. Although annual sales dropped from $10 to $3.5 billion, the value of the company's share price quadrupled. Anders earned over $40 million. He retired as CEO in 1993, and as chairman on 4 May 1994.

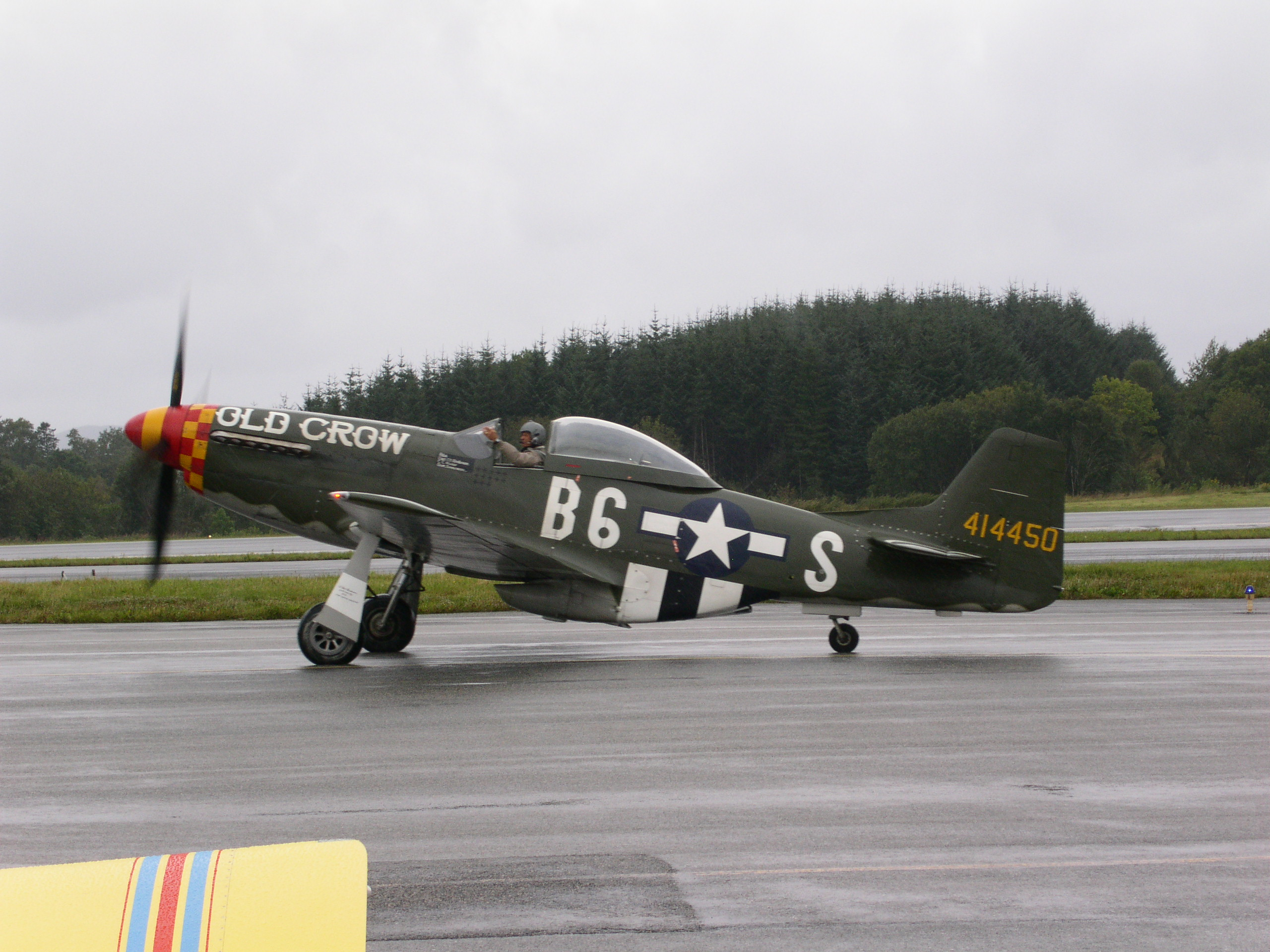
Anders taxiing a North American P-51 Mustang at Bergen Air Show in 2005

== Retirement and death ==
After retirement, Anders and his wife purchased a house in Anacortes, Washington, overlooking Puget Sound and Burrows Island. After realizing he disliked the winters in northwest Washington, he purchased a second home in Point Loma, California.

Anders established the William A. Anders Foundation, a philanthropic organization for the benefit of educational and environmental issues.

In 1996, he founded the Heritage Flight Museum in Bellingham, Washington; it moved to Skagit Regional Airport in Burlington, Washington. It was initially run by his family, with Anders as president until 2008, his wife Valerie as secretary, son Greg as vice president, executive director and webmaster, and son Alan as vice president and director of maintenance.

Anders died on 7 June 2024, at the age of 90, while flying the vintage T-34 registered to him. The aircraft crashed into the waters of north Puget Sound between Jones Island and Orcas Island. Witnesses reported the plane in a nosedive into a small channel between the islands, catching fire, then sinking. After a search by the U.S. Coast Guard and the San Juan County Sheriff's Department, Greg Anders confirmed the death of his father and the recovery of his body. Beginning with his Air Force career, Anders had logged over 8,000 flight hours.

Anders also died exactly seven months after the death of his fellow Apollo 8 crew member Frank Borman.

== Publications ==
- Kulp, B. A.; Detweiler, R. M.; Anders, W. A. (1 September 1963). "Temperature Dependence of Edge Emission in Single-Crystal Cadmium Sulfide". Physical Review. 131 (5): 2036–2038. Bibcode:1963PhRv..131.2036K. doi:10.1103/PhysRev.131.2036.

== Awards and honors ==
- Air Force Distinguished Service Medal
- Air Force Commendation Medal
- NASA Distinguished Service Medal
- Nuclear Regulatory Commission Distinguished Service Medal
- National Geographic Society's Hubbard Medal for Exploration
- Collier, Harmon, Dr. Robert H. Goddard and General Thomas D. White USAF Trophies
- Golden Plate Award of the American Academy of Achievement (1969)
- American Astronautical Society's Flight Achievement Award
- American Defense Preparedness Association's Industry Leadership Award (May 1993)
- The Anders crater on the Moon was named after him in 1970.
- In October 2018, the International Astronomical Union named a crater seen in the Anders's photo as "Anders' Earthrise".
- Along with his Apollo 8 crewmembers, Anders received AIAA's Haley Astronautics Award in 1970.
- In March 2023, Bill Anders was awarded the 2023 Michael Collins Trophy for Lifetime Achievement by the Smithsonian National Air and Space Museum.

Anders was inducted into the International Space Hall of Fame in 1983, the International Air & Space Hall of Fame in 1990, the United States Astronaut Hall of Fame in 1997, and the National Aviation Hall of Fame in 2004. He was a member of the Tau Beta Pi National Engineering Honor Society, American Nuclear Society, American Institute of Aeronautics and Astronautics, National Academy of Engineering, and Society of Experimental Test Pilots.

== In popular culture ==
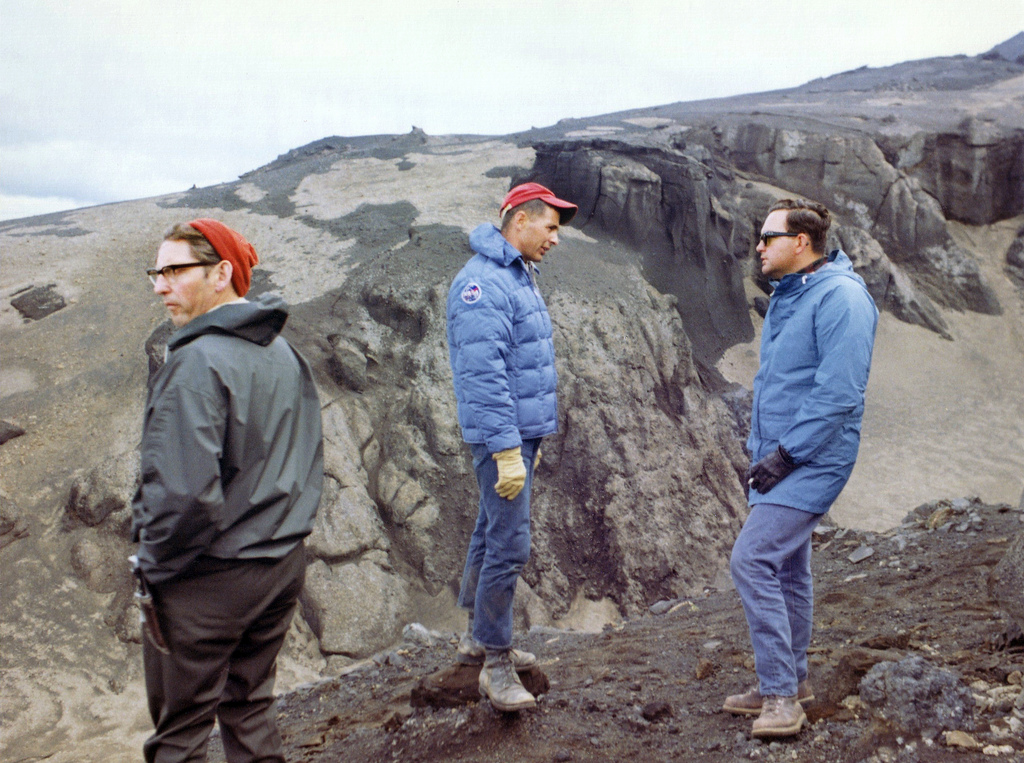
Icelandic geologist Sigurður Þórarinsson, Bill Anders, and Dr. Ted H. Foss during geology training in Iceland in 1967

Robert John Burke played Anders in the 1998 HBO miniseries From the Earth to the Moon. Anders appeared in the 2005 documentary Race to the Moon, which was shown as part of the PBS American Experience television series (season 18, episode 2). He was interviewed for a chapter of the 2015 book No More Worlds to Conquer by Chris Wright. The chapter is roughly evenly split between his life in the Apollo program and his later corporate life. The book's front cover is the Earthrise image. He appeared with fellow astronauts Frank Borman and Jim Lovell on the C-SPAN book review, Rocket Men. He confirmed the story that he had fallen asleep while awaiting the Apollo 8 launch. A sample of Anders's Genesis reading from Apollo 8 was used in the track "Let There Be Light" on the 1994 album The Songs of Distant Earth by Mike Oldfield.

== See also ==
- The Astronaut Monument
- List of spaceflight records
- Lai Ka-ying, the only other person born in, and first resident of, Hong Kong to fly to space

== Notes ==
Diplomatic posts
Preceded by Thomas R. Byrne	United States Ambassador to Norway; 1976–1977	Succeeded by Louis A. Lerner
