= Astronaut Monument =

Monument in Iceland

Coordinates: 66.047859°N 17.344387°W

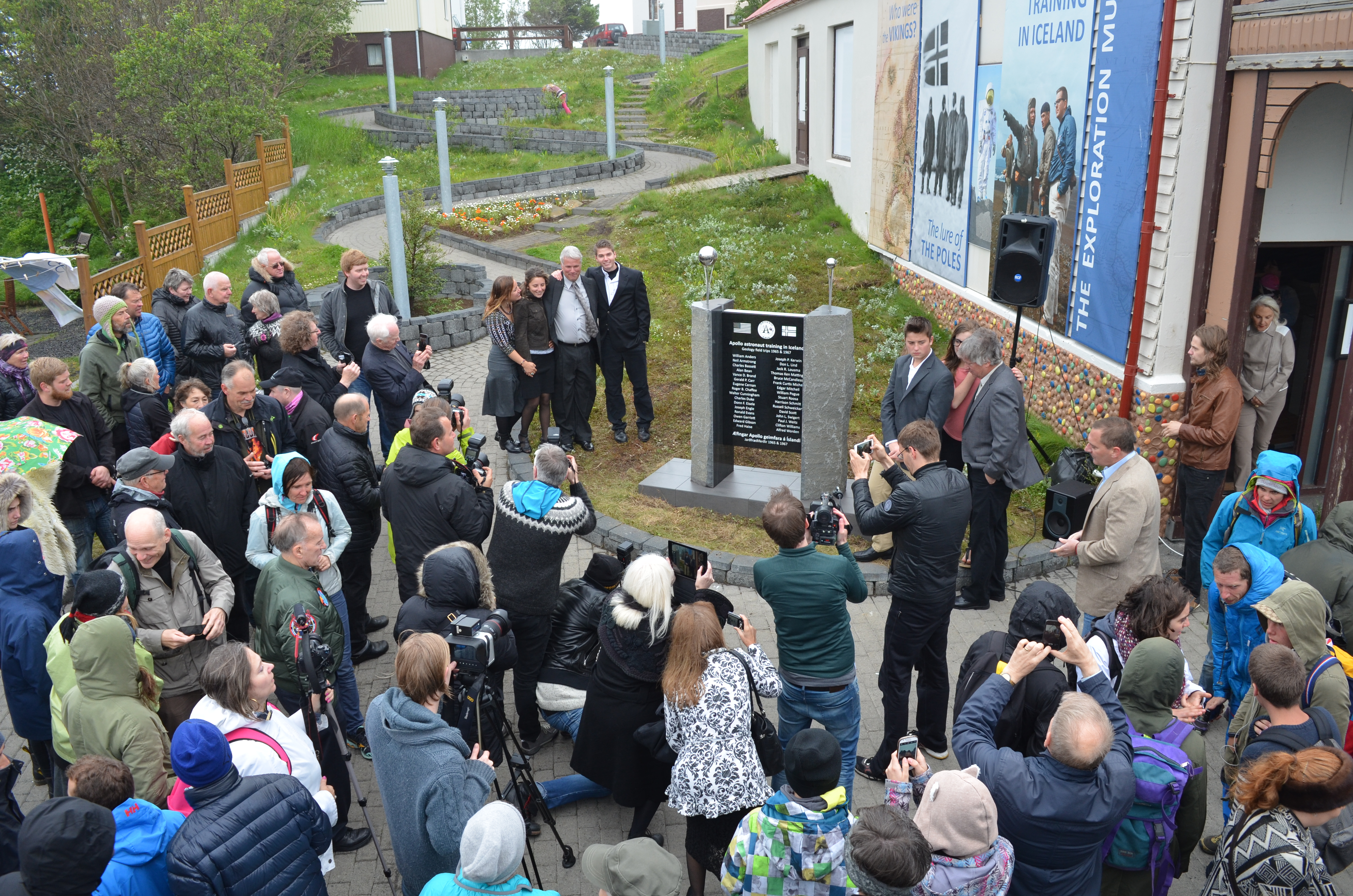
Neil Armstrong's grandchildren unveil the Astronaut Monument on July 15, 2015.

The Astronaut Monument is a monument commemorating the training of Apollo astronauts in northern Iceland in 1965 and 1967. It is located outside the Exploration Museum in Húsavík, and contains the names of 32 Apollo astronauts who were sent to Iceland for training in geology for crewed lunar missions. Fourteen of the trainee astronauts later flew to the Moon, and seven of those conducted geology work on the lunar surface.

The monument includes the names of the astronauts, the American and Icelandic flags, the insignia of the Apollo program, and features two steel globes on top of two basalt columns to represent the Earth and the Moon.

The monument was unveiled on July 15, 2015, by the grandchildren of Apollo 11 astronaut Neil Armstrong.

== Apollo geology trainees ==
The 32 Apollo astronauts listed on the monument are:

- William Anders
- Neil Armstrong
- Charles Bassett
- Alan Bean
- Vance D. Brand
- Gerald P. Carr
- Eugene Cernan
- Roger B. Chaffee
- Walter Cunningham
- Charles Duke
- Donn F. Eisele
- Joseph Engle
- Ronald Evans
- Owen Garriott
- Edward Gibson
- Fred Haise
- Joseph P. Kerwin
- Don L. Lind
- Jack R. Lousma
- Ken Mattingly
- Bruce McCandless
- Curt Michel
- Edgar Mitchell
- William Pogue
- Stuart Roosa
- Harrison Schmitt
- Russell Schweickart
- David Scott
- John L. Swigert
- Paul J. Weitz
- Clifton Williams
- Alfred Worden

Seven of the trainees did geological research and sample collection while on the Moon: Armstrong, Bean, Cernan, Duke, Mitchell, Schmitt, and Scott.

Seven others flew to the Moon but did not land: Anders, Evans, Haise, Mattingly, Roosa, Swigert, and Worden.

== See also ==
- Astronaut training
- Geology of the Moon
  - Moon rocks
  - Lunar soil
- Lunar Receiving Laboratory
- Lunar Sample Laboratory Facility
