= Amelia Rose Earhart =

American journalist and aviator

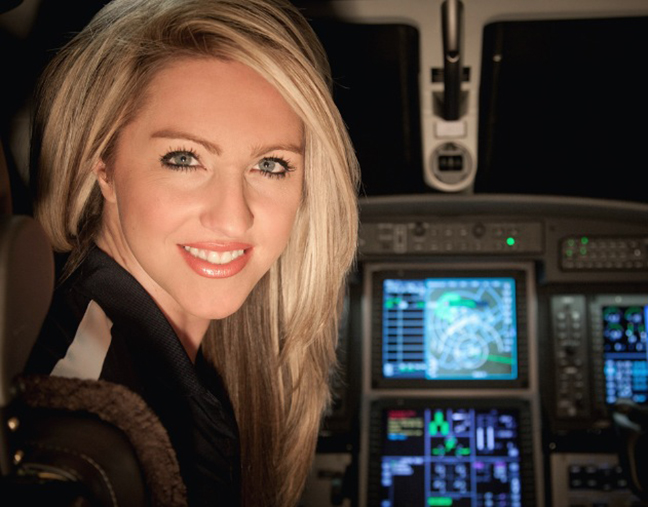
- Earhart circa 2013
- Born: January 18, 1983 (age 43); Downey, California, United States
- Known for: Completed a global circumnavigation flight in a single-engine aircraft; traffic and weather news anchor for KUSA-TV in Denver, Colorado
- Aviation career
- First flight: June 2, 2004
- Famous flights: Global circumnavigation from June 26 – July 11, 2014
- Website: Website archives

Amelia Rose Earhart (born January 18, 1983) is an American private pilot and former reporter for NBC affiliate KUSA-TV in Denver, Colorado. In 2013, Earhart started the Fly With Amelia Foundation, which grants flight scholarships to girls aged 16–18.

Earhart had claimed to be a "distant relative" of Amelia Mary Earhart. When she was in college, she hired a genealogist to research her connection to Amelia Earhart. That genealogist told her that she and Amelia shared a "distant common ancestry traced back to the 1700s", however, a second genealogical search in 2013 found there was no traceable connection.

Earhart took her first flying lesson on June 2, 2004, and obtained her private pilot certificate in a Cessna 172. In December 2011, she recreated her namesake's transcontinental flight from Oakland, California to Miami, Florida in a Cirrus SR22, as a completion of her instrument training hours.

In July 2013, she was awarded the Amelia Earhart Pioneering Achievement Award by the Atchison, Kansas Chamber of Commerce. The award is given to the woman who carries on Amelia Earhart's spirit.

In partnership with Denver's Wings Over the Rockies Air and Space Museum, Earhart completed a circumnavigation of the globe in a single-engine airplane with her copilot, Shane Jordan. Her route was to fly across the US, then south into the Caribbean, northeast Brazil, the South Atlantic Ocean, then the African continent, the Indian Ocean, the Pacific Islands, and the Pacific Ocean before returning to California. Earhart and Jordan started the global circumnavigation flight on June 26, 2014, departing Oakland, California at 8:19 am Pacific Standard Time in a single engine Pilatus PC-12 NG. They made 17 stops during the 24,300 nautical-mile trip over 108 flying hours, landing back in Oakland without incident on July 11, 2014. On July 9, as she and Jordan were flying over Howland Island (the island Amelia Mary Earhart was searching for during her 1937 disappearance) she announced, via Twitter, the names of the first recipients of the Fly With Amelia Foundation flight training scholarships.

She is the second youngest woman to fly around the world, following Richarda Morrow-Tait, who was the first.

In 2023, she co-wrote and self-published her first book, titled Learn to Love the Turbulence (ISBN 979-8218233969).

In 2025, she appeared in Matthew Syed's BBC Radio 4 series Sideways, discussing taking risks.
