= Walter Cunningham =

American astronaut (1932–2023)

R. Walter Cunningham
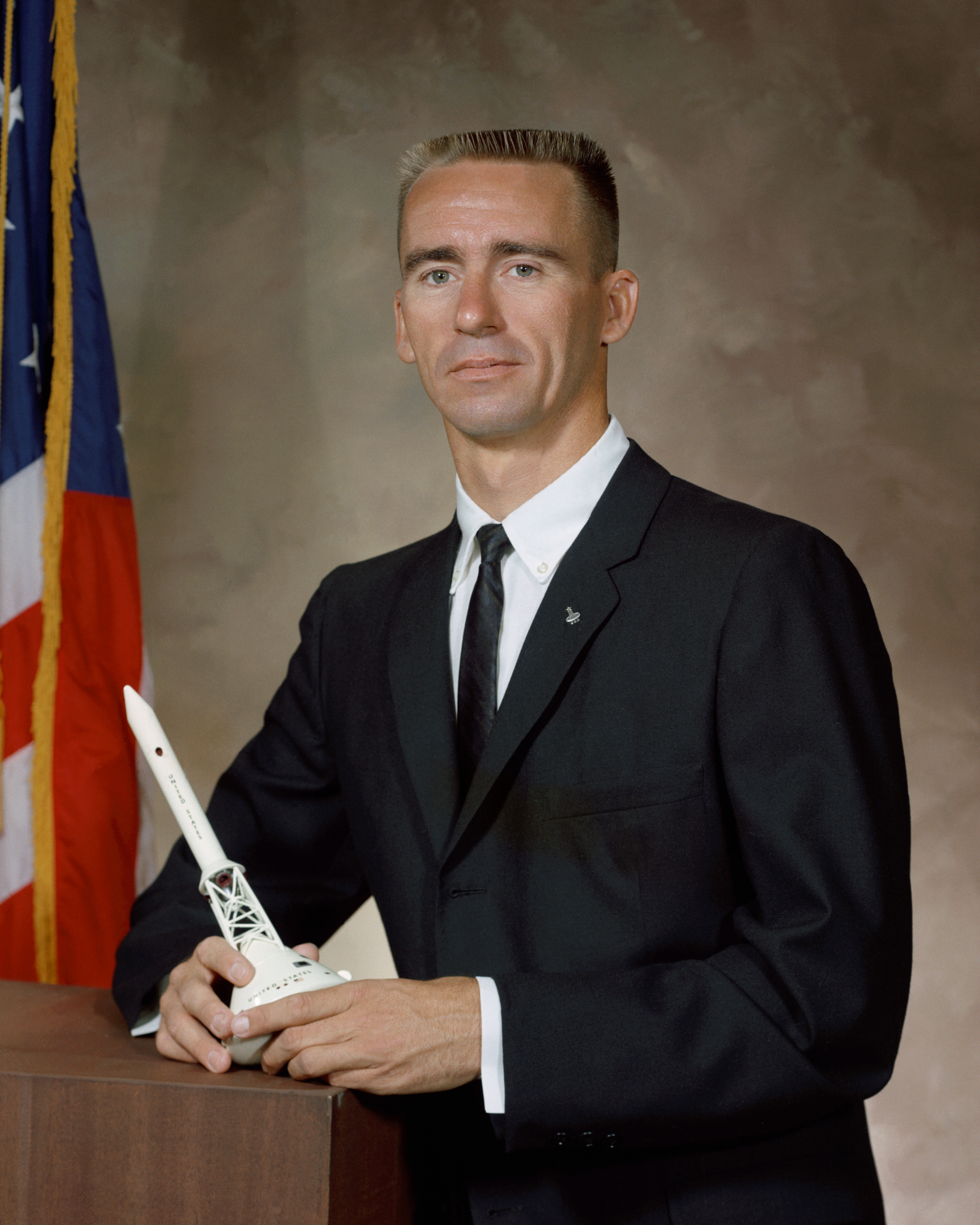
- Cunningham in 1964
- Born: Ronnie Walter Cunningham; March 16, 1932; Creston, Iowa, U.S.
- Died: January 3, 2023 (aged 90); Houston, Texas, U.S.
- Resting place: Texas State Cemetery
- Education: Santa Monica College (AS); University of California, Los Angeles (BA, MA)
- Spouses: Lo Ella Irby (m. 1956; div. 1989); Dorothy League (m. 1997)
- Children: 2
- Awards
- Space career

NASA astronaut
- Rank: Colonel, USMCR
- Time in space: 10d 20h 8m
- Selection: NASA Group 3 (1963)
- Missions: Apollo 7
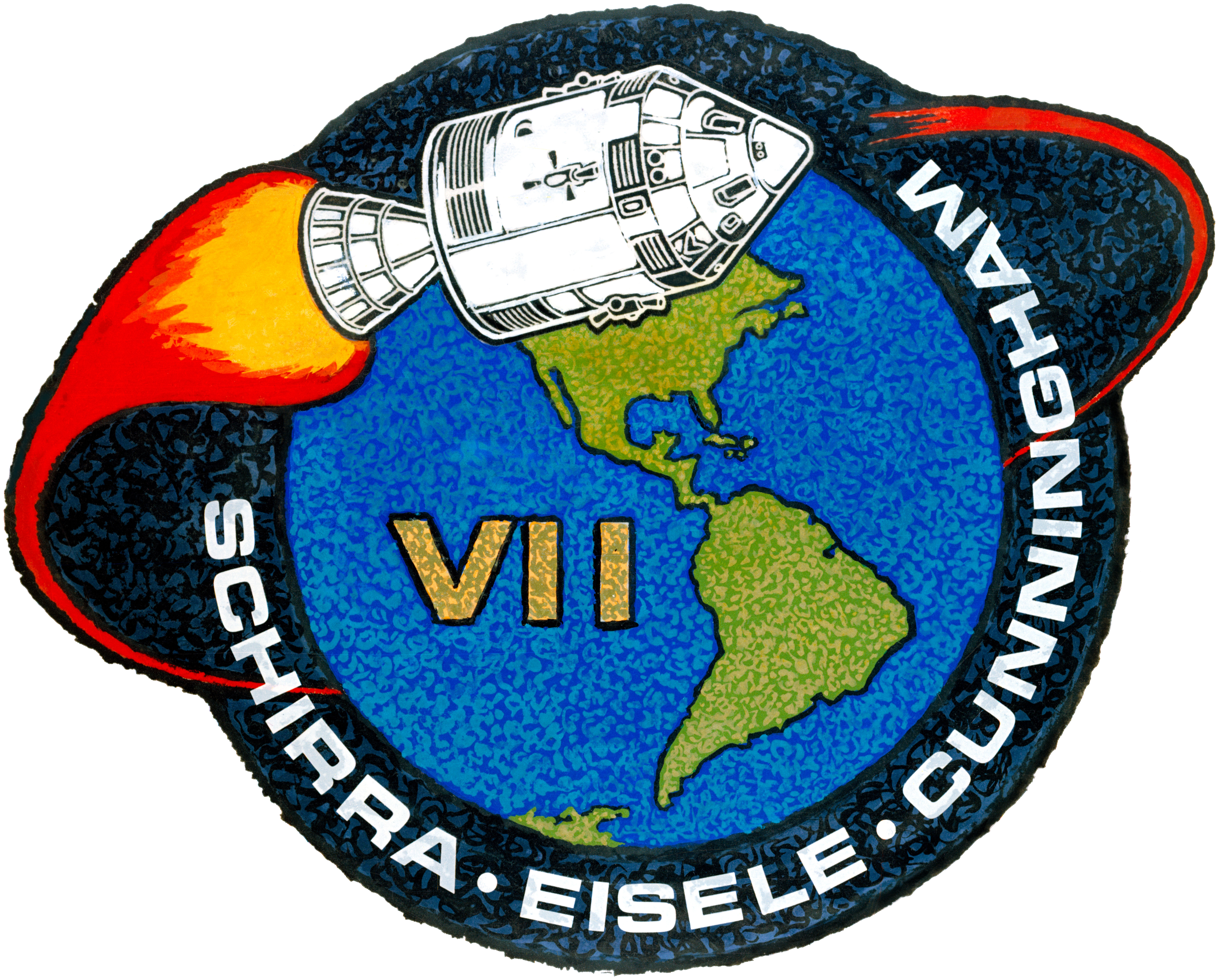
- Mission insignia
- Retired: August 1, 1971
- Website: Official website

Ronnie Walter Cunningham (March 16, 1932 – January 3, 2023) was an American astronaut, fighter pilot, physicist, entrepreneur, venture capitalist, and author of the 1977 book The All-American Boys. NASA's third civilian astronaut (after Neil Armstrong and Elliot See), he was a Lunar Module pilot on the Apollo 7 mission in 1968.

== Early life, education and military career ==
Cunningham was born in Creston, Iowa, on March 16, 1932. According to Cunningham, he intended to serve as a lieutenant commander in the Naval Air Corps, apparently inspired by a movie around 1940, named by Cunningham as Hell Divers. He graduated from Venice High School in Los Angeles, California, in 1950. The science building is named Cunningham Hall in his honor.

Thereafter, Cunningham continued his education at nearby Santa Monica College, intending to become an architect, until joining the U.S. Navy in 1951. Cunningham enlisted in the Navy to serve in the Korean War and return at an earlier time than those who were drafted. However, Cunningham had to take a two-year college equivalency test in order to qualify. He began flight training in 1952 and served on active duty as a fighter pilot with the U.S. Marine Corps from 1953 until 1956, flying 54 missions as a night fighter pilot in Korea. Armistice discussions were still ongoing when Cunningham initially left for Korea, and the Korean Armistice Agreement was signed just before he arrived. From 1956 to 1975, he continued to serve in the United States Marine Corps Reserve, ultimately retiring at the rank of colonel.

Upon completing his service obligation, Cunningham resumed his studies at Santa Monica College before transferring to the University of California, Los Angeles (UCLA) in 1958. Cunningham received his Bachelor of Arts degree with honors in 1960, and his Master of Arts degree with distinction in 1961, both in physics, from UCLA. He completed all requirements save for the dissertation for a Doctor of Philosophy degree in physics at UCLA during his time at RAND Corporation, where he spent three years prior to his NASA selection.

== NASA career ==
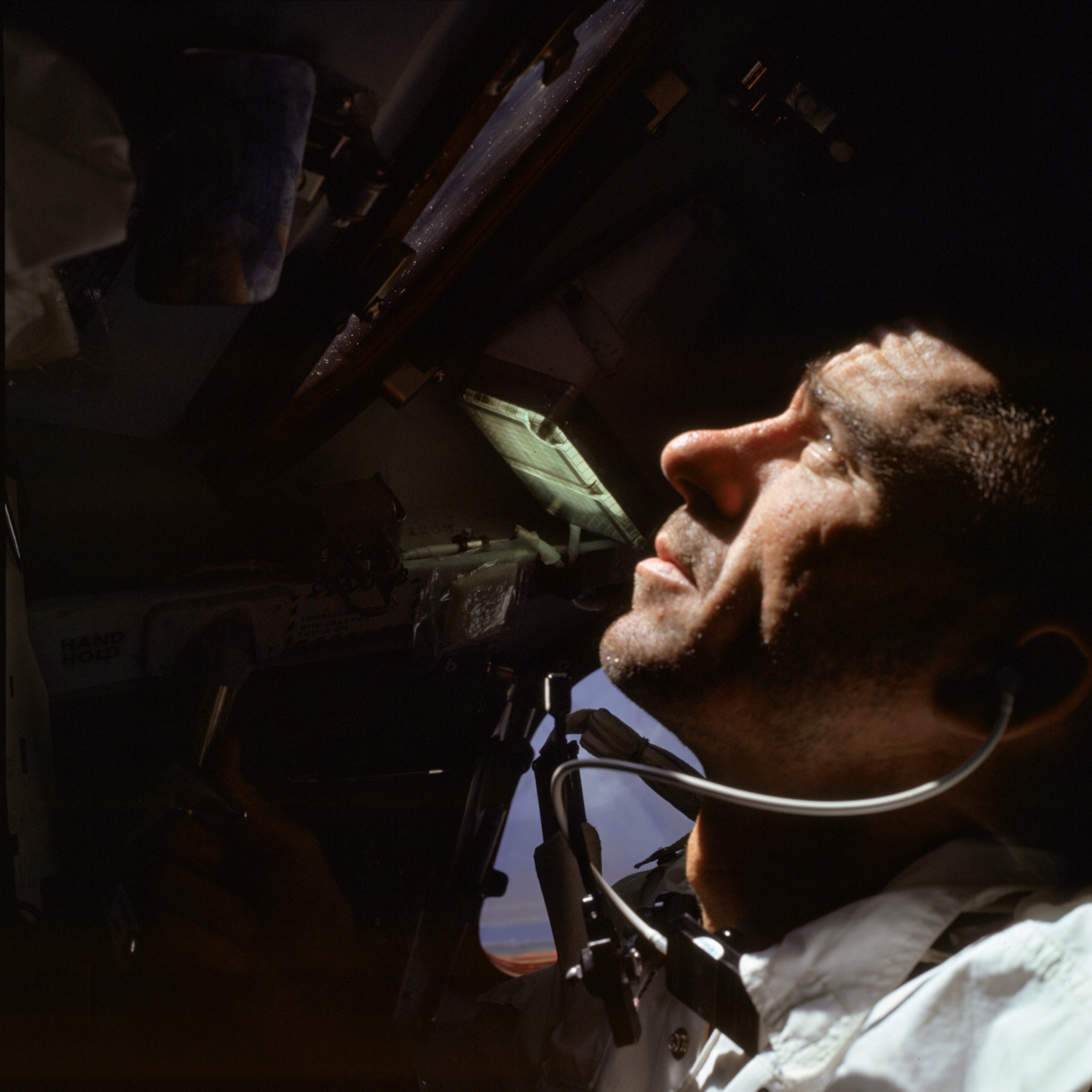
Cunningham during the Apollo 7 mission

In October 1963, Cunningham was one of the third group of astronauts selected by NASA. On October 11, 1968, he occupied the Lunar Module Pilot seat for the eleven-day flight of Apollo 7, the first launch of a crewed Apollo mission. The flight carried no Lunar Module and Cunningham was responsible for all spacecraft systems except launch and navigation. The crew kept busy with myriad system tests, including successfully completed test firing of the service module engine and measuring the accuracy of the spacecraft systems.

Following the Apollo 7 mission, Cunningham went on to head up the Skylab branch of the Astronaut Office at Johnson Space Center from 1968 to 1971. In this role, Cunningham coordinated the operational development, system integration, and habitability of Skylab hardware. Cunningham stated that he was informally offered the position of mission commander for Skylab 2, but after the position was officially given to Apollo 12 commander Pete Conrad, with Cunningham offered the position of backup commander, Cunningham left NASA in 1971. Cunningham accumulated more than 4,500 hours of flying time, including more than 3,400 in jet aircraft and 263 hours in space.

== Later life ==
On 17 June 1971, Cunningham's resignation from NASA was announced, effective on or about August 1, to become Vice President of Operations for Century Development Corp., developers of Greenway Plaza in Houston, Texas. In 1974, Cunningham attended Harvard Business School's six-week Advanced Management Program and later worked as a businessman and investor in a number of private ventures. In 1977, he published The All-American Boys, a reminiscence of his astronaut days. He was also a major contributor to and foreword writer for the 2007 space history book In the Shadow of the Moon. In 2018, Cunningham joined the Back to Space organization as an Astronaut Consultant with the goal of inspiring the next generation to go to Mars.

In 2008, NASA awarded Cunningham the NASA Distinguished Service Medal for his Apollo 7 mission. He became a radio talk-show host and public speaker, worked as a consultant to start-up technology companies, and was chairman of the Texas Aerospace Commission.

== Personal life and death ==
Cunningham married Lo Ella Irby of Norwalk, California, and had two children, Brian and Kimberley. Walter and Lo Ella eventually divorced. His second wife was retired Houston businesswoman Dorothy "Dot" Cunningham. Cunningham died in Houston on January 3, 2023, at age 90, from complications resulting from a fall.

== Global warming views ==
Cunningham rejected the scientific consensus on climate change. His biography page at the CO_{2} Coalition said "Since 2000, he has been writing and speaking out on the hoax that humans are controlling the temperature of the earth."

In 2010, Cunningham published a short book titled Global Warming: Facts versus Faith. In an editorial published in the Houston Chronicle on August 15, 2010, Cunningham claimed that the empirical evidence did not support global warming. In 2012, he and other former astronauts and NASA employees sent a critical letter to the agency highlighting what they believed to be "unproven assertions that man-made carbon dioxide was a major factor in global warming."

== Organizations ==
Cunningham was an associate fellow of the American Institute of Aeronautics and Astronautics, fellow of the American Astronautical Society, and member of the Society of Experimental Test Pilots, American Geophysical Union, Explorers Club, Sigma Pi Sigma and Sigma Xi, Association of Space Explorers, CO2 Coalition, Houston American Revolution Bicentennial Commission, Aviation Subcommittee, Houston Chamber of Commerce, Earth Awareness Foundation, and National Association of Small Business Investment Companies.

== Awards and honors ==
Cunningham was a recipient of numerous national and international honors, including:

- NASA Distinguished Service Medal
- NASA Exceptional Service Medal
- AIAA Haley Astronautics Award, 1969
- UCLA Professional Achievement Award, 1969
- Special Trustees Award, National Academy of Television Arts and Sciences (Emmy Award), 1969
- Medal of Valor, American Legion, 1975
- Outstanding American Award, American Conservative Union, 1975
- Listed in Who's Who
- George Haddaway Award, 2000
- Houston Hall of Fame
- International Space Hall of Fame, inducted in 1983
- U.S. Astronaut Hall of Fame, inducted in 1997
- Iowa Aviation Hall of Fame, inducted in 2003
- International Air & Space Hall of Fame, San Diego Air & Space Museum, inducted in 2011.
- National Aviation Hall of Fame, Inducted in 2018.

== In popular culture ==
In the 1998 HBO miniseries From the Earth to the Moon, Cunningham is portrayed by Fredric Lehne.

== See also ==
- The Astronaut Monument, Húsavík, Iceland

== Sources ==
- Cunningham, Walter (2003) [1977]. The All-American Boys (updated ed.). ibooks, inc. ISBN 978-1-59176-605-6.
- French, Francis; Burgess, Colin (September 2007). In the Shadow of the Moon: A Challenging Journey to Tranquility, 1965–1969. University of Nebraska Press. ISBN 978-0-8032-1128-5.
