= Rusty Schweickart =

American scientist, astronaut, businessman and policy adviser (born 1935)

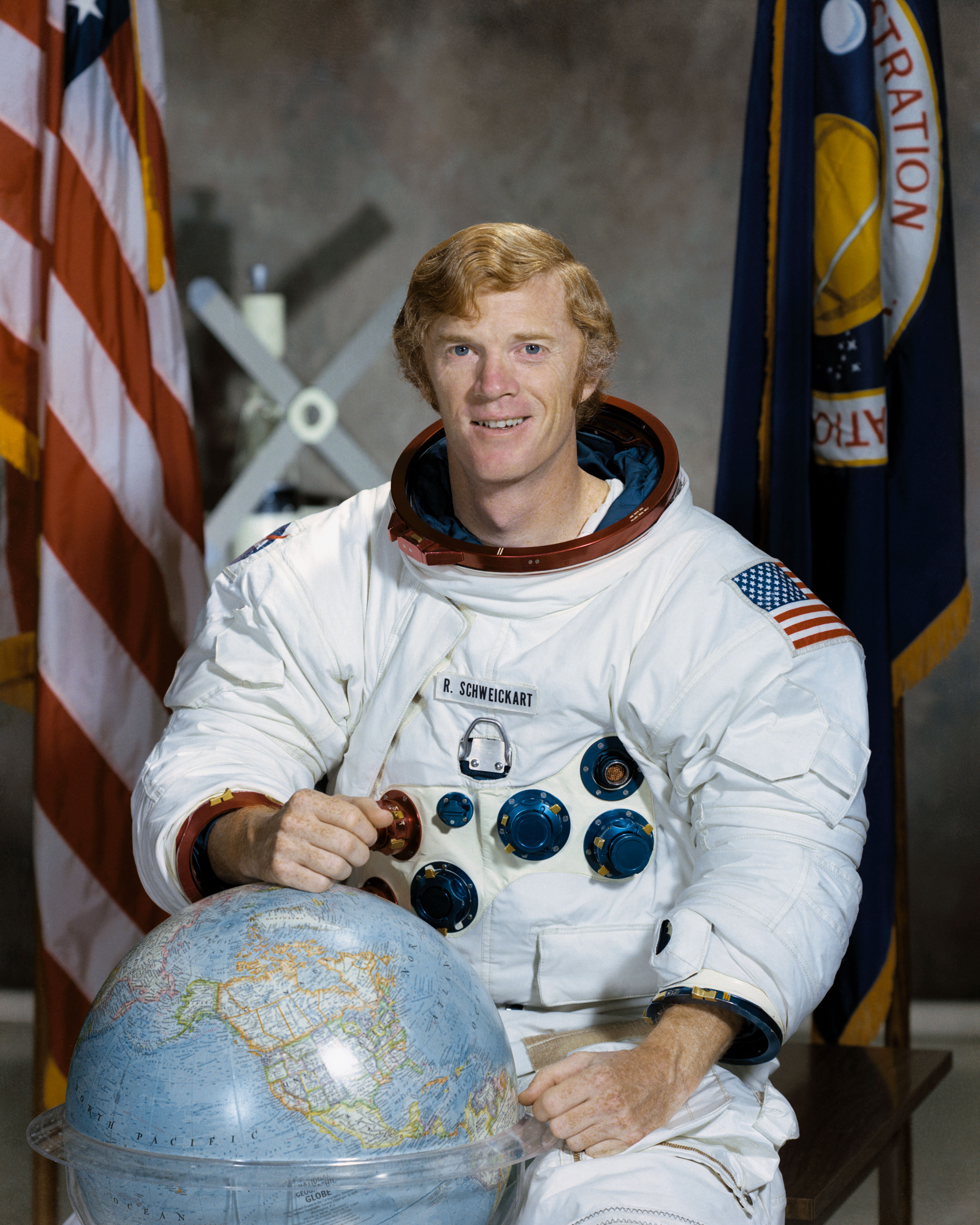
- Schweickart in 1971
- Born: Russell Louis Schweickart; 25 October 1935 (age 90); Neptune, New Jersey, U.S.
- Education: Massachusetts Institute of Technology (BS, MS)
- Spouses: Clare Whitfield (m. 1958, divorced); Nancy Ramsey
- Children: 4
- Awards: NASA Distinguished Service Medal
- Space career

NASA astronaut
- Rank: Captain, USAF
- Time in space: 10d 1h 0m
- Selection: NASA Group 3 (1963)
- Total EVAs: 1
- Total EVA time: 1h 17m
- Mission: Apollo 9
- Retired: 1977
- Website: rustyschweickart.com

Russell Louis Schweickart (born October 25, 1935) is an American aeronautical engineer and former NASA astronaut, research scientist, U.S. Air Force fighter pilot, business executive, and government executive.

Schweickart was selected in 1963 for NASA's third astronaut group. He was the Lunar Module Pilot on the 1969 Apollo 9 mission, the first crewed flight test of the lunar module, on which he performed the first in-space test of the portable life support system used by the Apollo astronauts who walked on the Moon. As backup commander of the first crewed Skylab mission in 1973, he was responsible for developing the hardware and procedures used by the first crew to perform critical in-flight repairs of the Skylab station. After Skylab, he served for a time as Director of User Affairs in NASA's Office of Applications.

Schweickart left NASA in 1977 to serve for two years as California Governor Jerry Brown's assistant for science and technology, then was appointed by Brown to California's Energy Commission for five and a half years, serving as chairman for three.

In 1984–85, Schweickart co-founded the Association of Space Explorers and later in 2002 co-founded the B612 Foundation, a non-profit organization dedicated to defending Earth from asteroid impacts, along with fellow former astronaut Ed Lu and two planetary scientists. He served for a period as its chair before becoming its chair emeritus.

== Early life and education ==
Rusty Schweickart was born October 25, 1935, in Neptune Township, New Jersey, and grew up on a "hardscrabble" farm of 45 acres (18 ha) producing hay and vegetables plus raising poultry and cows. As a youth his ambition was to be a pilot and a cowboy. After graduating from Manasquan High School in 1952, he earned a Bachelor of Science degree in aeronautical engineering on scholarship (1956) and a Master of Science degree in aeronautics and astronautics (1963) from the Massachusetts Institute of Technology.

He was active in the Boy Scouts of America. He earned the rank of First Class. His hobbies include golf, bicycling, and hiking. He was married twice and has seven children.

His family's stated annual income when he received his Massachusetts Institute of Technology scholarship after graduating high school was listed as $1800 (equivalent to $21,823 in 2025).

== Military and NASA career ==
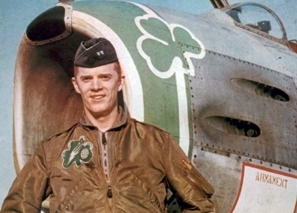
Schweickart standing in front of his North American F-86 Sabre in 1963

Schweickart served in the U.S. Air Force and Massachusetts Air National Guard (101st Tactical Fighter Squadron) from 1956 to 1963, with over 4,000 hours of flight time, including 3,500 hours in high performance jet aircraft.

Prior to joining NASA, Schweickart was a research scientist at the Experimental Astronomy Laboratory at the Massachusetts Institute of Technology, and his work there involved research upper atmospheric physics, star tracking and stabilization of stellar images. His thesis for a master's degree at MIT concerned stratospheric radiance.

Schweickart was chosen as part of NASA Astronaut Group 3 in October 1963. He was the youngest in the group. The third group of astronauts performed jungle training. Schweickart partnered with Clifton Williams. On March 21, 1966, he was named as the backup pilot for Roger B. Chaffee on Apollo 1—which was to have been the first crewed Apollo flight but was destroyed during a ground test accident. His fellow crewmen were backup Command Pilot James McDivitt and Senior Pilot David Scott, both veterans of Project Gemini. In December 1966, this crew was promoted to fly the first crewed Earth orbital test of the Apollo Lunar Module (LM), with Schweickart as Lunar Module Pilot.

=== Spaceflight experience ===
The frontier in space, embodied in the space colony, is one in which the interactions between humans and their environment is so much more sensitive and interactive and less tolerant of irresponsibility than it is on the whole surface of the Earth. We are going to learn how to relate to the Earth and our own natural environment here by looking seriously at space colony ecologies.

— Rusty Schweickart

Apollo 9 was flown in March 1969. Schweickart spent just over 241 hours in space, and performed the first extravehicular activity (EVA) of the Apollo program, testing the portable life support system that was later used by the twelve astronauts who walked on the Moon. The flight plan called for him to demonstrate an emergency transfer from the lunar module to the command module (CM) using handrails on the LM, but he began to suffer from space adaptation syndrome on the first day in orbit, forcing the postponement of the EVA.

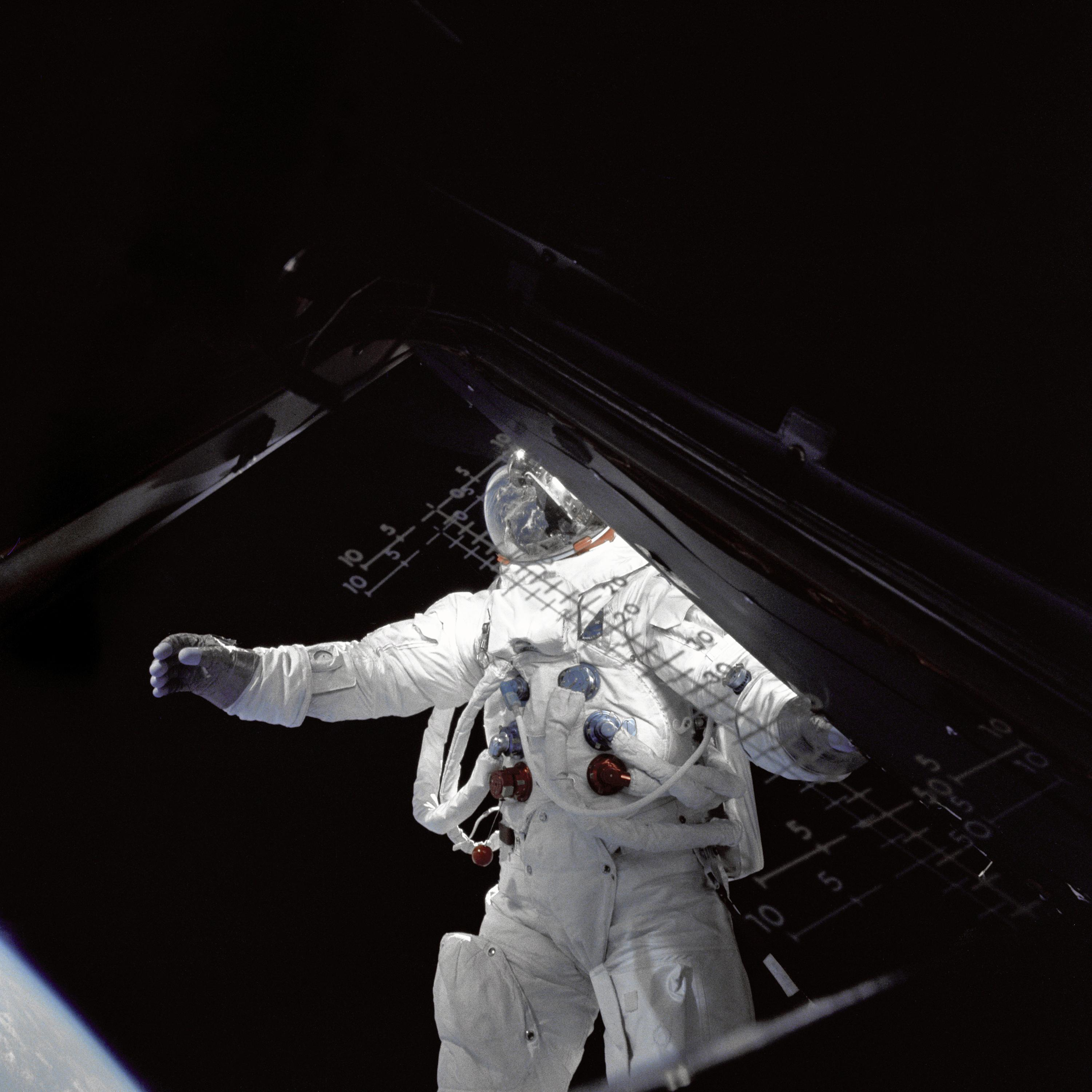
Schweickart performs an EVA standing on the lunar module porch, photographed by fellow astronaut James McDivitt inside the LM.

Eventually, he improved enough to perform a relatively brief EVA with his feet restrained on the LM "porch" (a platform used in transferring to the descent ladder), while Command Module Pilot Scott performed a stand-up EVA through the open hatch of the CM. During a five-minute pause tethered outside his spacecraft, Schweickart felt he underwent a metaphysical experience as he stared at the Earth, contemplating its place in the universe. He subsequently practiced Transcendental Meditation based on his experience.

=== Skylab and beyond ===
Although Deke Slayton (who was responsible for all flight assignments as Director of Flight Crew Operations) opined that Schweickart "would have been a logical lunar module pilot" on subsequent lunar missions—indeed, the standard rotation of the era would have placed him on the backup crew for Apollo 12 and the prime crew of Apollo 15 —"that bout of space sickness had everybody worried ... it didn't seem like a good idea to put him back in ... at this point." Following his mission, Schweickart "basically called the shot that I really didn't want to be assigned to a flight until we knew more about motion sickness" and became "[a] motion sickness guinea pig" for six months; while "[he] didn't learn that much" during the testing, it is now accepted that as many as half of space travelers suffer from space adaptation syndrome to some extent.

The protracted testing period also contributed to Schweickart not being assigned to the Apollo 12 backup crew. When he returned to Houston, "Al Shepard [Slayton's deputy], for whatever reason, instead of putting me back on Apollo, put me on to Skylab ... Al had his own agenda of who went where and whatnot. So I cycled into Skylab at the time." Schweickart has also observed that he was "not one of Al's boys", alluding to the political liberalism that he shared with his then-wife, Clare; Slayton felt that her fervent political stances (including civil rights activism) "caused him a few problems with his colleagues." During this period, a Houston radio broadcaster characterized Schweickart as "the closest thing to a freak astronaut" after he was photographed escorting Maharishi Mahesh Yogi on a tour of NASA's headquarters.

Along with backup science pilot Story Musgrave and backup pilot Bruce McCandless II, Schweickart was assigned as backup commander of Skylab 2, the first crewed American space station mission, which flew during the spring of 1973. Following the loss of the space station's thermal shield during launch, he assumed responsibility for the development of hardware and procedures for erecting an emergency solar shade and deploying a jammed solar array wing, operations that saved the space station.

After serving on the support crew of Skylab 4, Schweickart was more interested in cultivating managerial skills than "[going] over to the Space Shuttle development work which was under way ... by that time, I had, you know, done a lot of work on Gemini in a support role, and then, of course, everything on Apollo, and now all of this on Skylab, and to go cycle back into the very beginning of the Space Shuttle, which was not going to fly for, at that point, something like six years and best guess of anybody in the business was maybe eight years, I figured, you know, another eight years of basically going to the same kinds of meetings, making the same kinds of decisions, going to the same places ... it was like 'been there, done that.'"

While retaining his flight status, he was reassigned to NASA Headquarters in Washington, D.C. as Director of User Affairs in the Office of Applications in 1974. In this capacity, he was responsible for transferring NASA technology (primarily Landsat 1 applications) to the outside world and working with technology users (including the U.S. Department of Agriculture and water resources managers) to bring an understanding of their needs into NASA. He came to regard this as a "thankless position" and a "very hard sell" to potential clients due to their intrinsic resistance to new processes; this and the dearth of immediate flight opportunities ultimately precipitated his departure from NASA in 1977.

== Post-NASA career ==
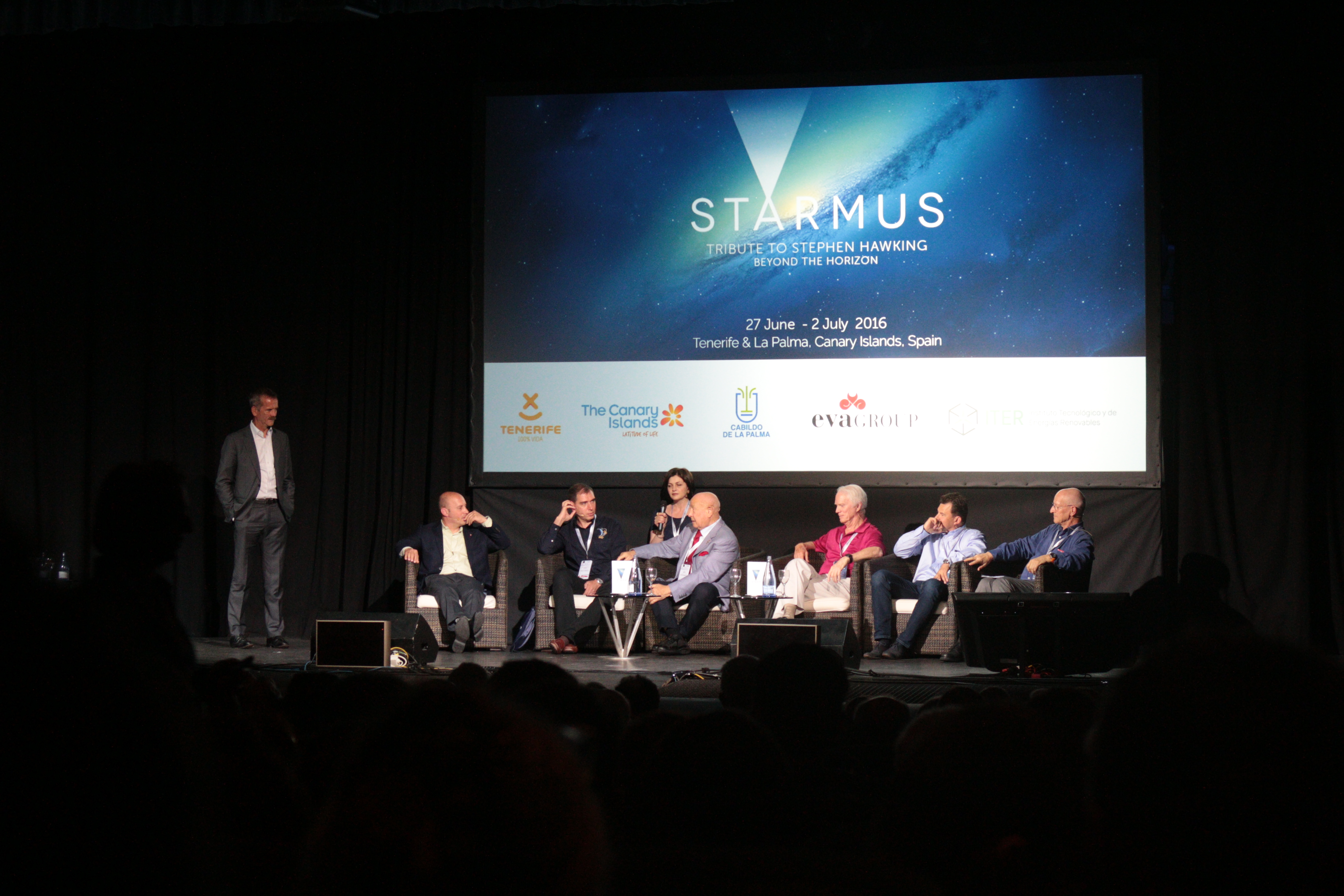
Schweickart and Alexei Leonov at the 2016 Starmus Festival

Schweickart then served for two years as California Governor Jerry Brown's assistant for science and technology before being appointed by Brown to the California Energy Commission for five and a half years.

Inspired by his friendship with Michael Murphy and involvement in the Esalen Institute's Soviet-American Exchange Program, Schweickart established the Association of Space Explorers (ASE) in 1984–85 along with cosmonauts Alexei Leonov, Vitaly Sevastyanov, and Georgi Grechko; the organization is open to all people who have flown in orbit around the Earth. He also chaired the ASE's near-Earth object committee, which produced a benchmark report and submitted it to the United Nations Committee on the Peaceful Uses of Outer Space (UN COPUOS) on Asteroid Threats: A Call for Global Response.

Schweickart retired from ALOHA Networks, Inc. in 1998 where he served as President and Chief Executive Officer from 1996 through 1998. ALOHA was a data communications company specializing in high performance, wireless internet access equipment.

Schweickart was formerly the Executive Vice President of CTA Commercial Systems, Inc. and Director of Low Earth Orbit (LEO) Systems. Schweickart led CTA's efforts in developing the GEMnet system, a second generation LEO communication satellite constellation designed to provide regular commercial electronic messaging services on a global basis. Prior to his CTA work, Schweickart founded and was President of Courier Satellite Services, Inc., a global satellite communications company that developed LEO satellites to provide worldwide affordable data services.

Schweickart's satellite and telecommunications work involved him in the development of international communications regulations and policies, including participation in the 1992 and 1995 World Radiocommunication Conferences (WRC) of the International Telecommunication Union (ITU). He served at the 1995 WRC as a U.S. delegate. He also worked extensively in Russia and the former Soviet Union on scientific and telecommunications matters.

In 2002 he co-founded the B612 Foundation along with fellow former-astronaut Ed Lu and two planetary scientists, also serving as its chair. The B612 Foundation is a non-profit dedicated to defending Earth from asteroid impacts.

In May 2005 Schweickart testified before the U.S. Congress on the dangers of an asteroid impact related to 99942 Apophis, and in 2010 served as the co-chairman, along with astronaut Tom Jones, of the NASA Advisory Council Ad-Hoc Task Force on Planetary Defense. He has been an advocate of increasing NASA's annual budget by $250M–$300M over a 10-year period to more fully catalog the NEOs that can pose a threat to Earth and also provide a deflection capability.

Schweickart has also spoken and taught at the Esalen Institute, and currently serves as the B612 Foundation's Chair Emeritus.

== Organizations ==
Schweickart is a fellow of the American Astronautical Society and the International Academy of Astronautics, and an associate fellow of the American Institute of Aeronautics and Astronautics. He is also an honorary trustee and a fellow of the California Academy of Sciences.

== Awards and honors ==
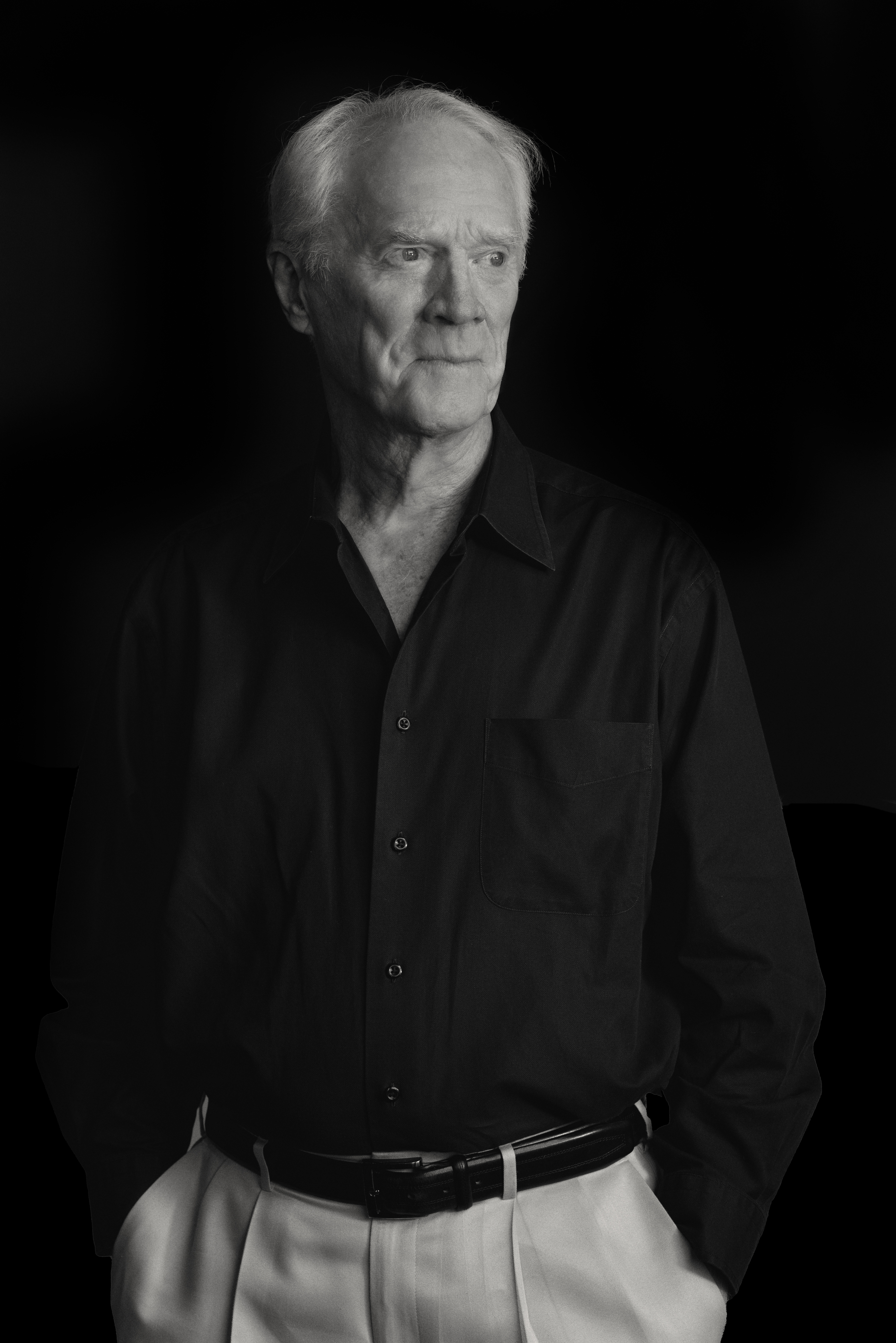
Rusty Schweickart in 2022

He was awarded the NASA Distinguished Service Medal (1969) and the Fédération Aéronautique Internationale De la Vaulx Medal (1970) for his Apollo 9 flight. He also received the National Academy of Television Arts and Sciences Special Trustees Award (Emmy Award) in 1969 for transmitting the first live TV pictures from space. In 1973, Schweickart was also awarded the NASA Exceptional Service Medal for his leadership role in the Skylab rescue efforts. He was inducted into the International Space Hall of Fame in 1983 and the U.S. Astronaut Hall of Fame in 1997. Main-belt asteroid 17033 Rusty was named in his honor.

In 2012, Schweickart was inducted into the International Air & Space Hall of Fame at the San Diego Air & Space Museum.

In 2024, Schweickart received The Legendary Explorer Award by The Explorers Club.

In 1892, his grandfather Jacques Schweickart emigrated from Lembach, a small town located in Alsace, France, to the United States. After visiting Lembach several times, Schweickart has been awarded honorary citizenship of the town.

== Biographies and portrayals ==
In the 1998 HBO miniseries From the Earth to the Moon, Schweickart is portrayed by Kieran Mulroney. He also appeared in the television series The Universe in the episodes "The End of the Earth: Deep Space Threats to Our Planet" and "Stopping Armageddon".

== See also ==
- B612 Foundation
- Spaceguard
- The Astronaut Monument
