= List of From the Earth to the Moon cast members =

This is a list of actors who play significant real and fictional characters in the 1998 HBO docudrama TV miniseries From the Earth to the Moon.

== Fictional and/or connective characters ==
- Tom Hanks appears as host of the first 11 episodes, introducing each from in front of a huge relief sculpture of the Greek god Apollo. This format is not used for the final episode, "Le Voyage dans la Lune", in which Hanks appears in character as Jean-Luc Despont, assistant to French filmmaker Georges Méliès.
- Lane Smith portrays Emmett Seaborn, a fictional news reporter for a fictitious television network. Seaborn appears in 6 episodes, covering America's space program from the earliest days through the flight of Apollo 13. He also appears in the final episode, reporting on the final Apollo 17 lunar mission, and is himself an interview subject in a mock documentary. The fictional character was added to provide a sense of continuity to the series, often serving as a Greek chorus. Seaborn's personality is similar in some respects to Walter Cronkite, though the real Cronkite is mentioned at times and seen in archive footage. The use of a fictional character also allows for dramatic conflict to be created more easily in episode 8, "We Interrupt This Program," with another fictional reporter.
- Clint Howard as fictional flight controller Paul Lucas in episode 5, "Spider," and episode 8, "We Interrupt This Program".
- Jay Mohr as Brett Hutchins, a fictional young television reporter who competes for Emmett Seaborn's job in episode 8.
- John Michael Higgins as the host of a fashion show featuring the nine wives of NASA Astronaut Group 2 in episode 11, "The Original Wives' Club".
- Blythe Danner provides voice-over narration for much of the final episode, which is presented in a documentary format.

== Astronauts ==
=== First Astronaut Group ("The Mercury Seven") ===
- Ted Levine as Alan Shepard, one of the original Mercury Seven astronauts. America's first astronaut to fly in episode 1 "Can We Do This?", and commander of the Apollo 14 Moon landing mission in episode 9 "For Miles and Miles".
- Mark Rolston as Gus Grissom, Mercury and Gemini veteran who commands the ill-fated Apollo 1 in episode 2 "Apollo One", killed along with Ed White and Roger Chaffee, also seen at CAPCOM station, during White's EVA on Gemini 4 in episode 1.
- Mark Harmon as Wally Schirra, Mercury and Gemini veteran who commands Apollo 7 in episode 3, "We Have Cleared the Tower", originally backup commander of Apollo 1.
- Robert C. Treveiler as Gordon Cooper, Mercury and Gemini veteran seen at CAPCOM during Gemini 4 in episode 11, "The Original Wives' Club", and in TV interview during episode 9.
- Nick Searcy as Deke Slayton, grounded Project Mercury astronaut who becomes Director of Flight Operations, responsible for supervising the astronauts and determining the flight rotation, appears in all the episodes except "The Original Wives' Club".

=== Second Astronaut Group ("The New Nine") ===
- Tony Goldwyn as Neil Armstrong, part of 1962's Astronaut Group 2, performs first docking in space as commander of Gemini 8 in episode 1, and is the first human to set foot on the Moon on Apollo 11 in episode 6, "Mare Tranquillitatis".
- David Andrews as Frank Borman, commands his first flight on the Gemini 7 14-day endurance mission, and also commands the first flight to the Moon on Apollo 8 in episode 4, "1968". He also serves on the investigation board of the Apollo 1 fire in episode 2, "Apollo One", and appears in episode 11, "The Original Wives' Club".
- Peter Scolari portrays Pete Conrad in episode 1 as he joins NASA in 1962 in the second group of astronauts, intended to fly in Project Gemini. Paul McCrane is cast as Conrad in episode 7 "That's All There Is", as commander of the second lunar landing mission, Apollo 12.
- Tim Daly as Jim Lovell, who flies with Borman on Gemini 7 and commands Gemini 12 in episode 1, flies with Borman again on Apollo 8 in episode 4, commands Apollo 13 (off-screen) in episode 8, "We Interrupt This Broadcast", and appears in episode 11.
- Conor O'Farrell as James McDivitt, commander of Gemini 4 in episode 1, and commander of Apollo 9 in episode 5, "Spider". Later seen as Manager of the Apollo Spacecraft Program in episode 8, and heard briefly in radio broadcast during Gemini 4 in episode 11
- Steve Zahn as Elliot See, scheduled to command Gemini 9 but killed in a plane crash before the flight in episode 1.
- Steve Hofvendahl as Thomas P. Stafford, flew on Gemini 6A, and commanded Gemini 9A (both off-screen), seen briefly as commander of Apollo 10 in episode 5. Also backup commander of Apollo 7 in episode 3, and originally slated to fly with Alan Shepard on first crewed flight of Project Gemini, before Shepard`s grounding in episode 9. Also seen during astronaut briefing in episode 1.
- Chris Isaak as Ed White, America's first astronaut to walk in space on Gemini 4 in episode 1, later killed in a fire preparing for Apollo 1 in episode 2.
- John Posey as John Young, who flew two Gemini missions and on Apollo 10 (all off-screen), and commands the Apollo 16 lunar landing mission in episode 11. Also backup crew member of Apollo 7 in episode 3. Also seen arrival of astronaut group, and later astronaut briefing, in episode 1.

=== Third Astronaut Group ===
- Bryan Cranston as Buzz Aldrin, part of 1963's Astronaut Group 3, performs EVA during Gemini 12 in episode 1, seen as Lunar Module pilot of Apollo 11 in episode 6.
- Robert John Burke as William Anders, Apollo 8 crew member, episode 4.
- Dave Foley as Alan Bean, Lunar Module pilot on Apollo 12 in episode 7.
- Daniel Hugh Kelly as Eugene Cernan, Gemini veteran and lunar module pilot of Apollo 10 in episode 5, backup commander of Apollo 14 in episode 9, and commander of Apollo 17 in episode 12, "Le Voyage dans la Lune". Also seen during astronaut briefing in episode 1.
- Ben Marley as Roger B. Chaffee, assigned to fly his first mission on Apollo 1 in episode 1, killed in accidental fire along with Grissom and White in episode 2. Seen briefly in episode 7, "That's All There Is".
- Cary Elwes as Michael Collins, Gemini veteran and Command Module pilot on Apollo 11, episode 6, also CAPCOM during Apollo 8 in episode 4.
- Fredric Lehne (billed as Frederick Lane) as Walter Cunningham, Apollo 7 crew member, episode 3.
- John Mese as Donn F. Eisele, Apollo 7 crew member in episode 3. Mentioned as being originally intended for Apollo 1 crew before being dropped due to shoulder injury.
- Tom Verica as Richard F. Gordon Jr., Gemini veteran and Command Module pilot on Apollo 12 in episode 7, backup commander of Apollo 15 in episode 10. Seen during astronaut briefing in episode 1.
- Brett Cullen as David Scott, Gemini veteran and Command Module pilot on Apollo 9, and commander of lunar landing mission Apollo 15 in episode 10, "Galileo Was Right".
- Kieran Mulroney as Russell "Rusty" Schweickart, the first Lunar Module pilot on Apollo 9, episode 5.
- Jim Leavy as C.C. Williams, originally intended for assignment on Pete Conrad's lunar landing crew (what would become Apollo 12), before being killed in a plane crash and replaced with Alan Bean, in episode 7. Also seen during astronaut briefing in episode 1.

=== Fourth Astronaut Group ===
- Tom Amandes as Harrison "Jack" Schmitt, a geologist-astronaut from 1965's Astronaut Group 4 responsible for improving the method of training the lunar explorers as part of Apollo 15 backup crew in episode 10. He flies as Lunar Module pilot on the last lunar mission, Apollo 17 in episode 12.
- Geoffrey Nauffts as Ed Gibson, serving as CAPCOM during Apollo 12 in episode 7. Nauffts’ character is a composite character of Gibson and Gerald Carr.

=== Fifth Astronaut Group ===
- J. Downing as Charles Duke, part of 1966's Astronaut Group 5, CAPCOM during Apollo 11 landing in episode 6, Lunar Module pilot on Apollo 16 in episode 10.
- Adam Baldwin as Fred Haise, Lunar Module pilot on Apollo 13 (off-screen), seen as CAPCOM during Apollo 14 in episode 9.
- Gareth Williams as James Irwin, Lunar Module pilot on Apollo 15 in episode 10.
- Željko Ivanek as Ken Mattingly, Command Module pilot on Apollo 16 in episode 10.
- Gary Cole as Edgar Mitchell, Lunar Module pilot on Apollo 14 in episode 9.
- George Newbern as Stuart Roosa, CAPCOM during Apollo 1 fire in episode 2, Command Module pilot on Apollo 14 in episode 9.
- Michael Raynor as Alfred Worden, Command Module pilot on Apollo 15 in episode 10.

=== Sixth Astronaut Group ===
- Doug McKeon as Joe Allen, CAPCOM during Apollo 15 in episode 10.
- Chris Ellis as Bob Parker, CAPCOM during Apollo 17 in episode 12.

== NASA ground personnel ==
- Dan Lauria as James E. Webb, NASA's second Administrator from 1961 to 1968; appears mainly in episodes 1 and 2.
- George Bartenieff as Hugh L. Dryden, NASA's first Deputy Administrator until 1965.
- John Carroll Lynch as Robert R. Gilruth, first Director of the Manned Spacecraft Center
- Reed Birney as John Houbolt, the NASA Langley engineer who fought to persuade NASA management that a separate spacecraft (the Lunar Module) was the easiest way to achieve a crewed lunar landing.
- Stephen Root as Christopher Kraft, NASA's first Flight Director, later second Director of the Manned Spacecraft Center.
- Dan Butler as Flight Director Gene Kranz.
- Joe Spano as George Mueller, Associate Administrator of the Office of Manned Space Flight from September 1963 until December 1969; appears in episode 2.
- Sam Anderson as Thomas O. Paine, Webb's successor as NASA Administrator.
- Barry Bell as Rocco Petrone, Apollo Program Director
- Dann Florek as Robert Seamans, NASA's second Deputy Administrator from 1965 to 1968; appears in episodes 2 and 5.
- Jim Piddock as Flight Director John Hodge; appears in episode 1.
- Kevin Pollak as Joseph Francis Shea, head of the Apollo Spacecraft Program Office.
- Dakin Matthews as Dr. Floyd L. Thompson, director of NASA's Langley Research Center, who led the Apollo 1 accident review board.
- Norbert Weisser as Dr. Wernher von Braun

== Astronauts' family members ==
- Betsy Brantley and Ann Cusack as Jan Armstrong, wife of Neil Armstrong
- Rita Wilson as Susan Borman, wife of Frank Borman.
- Diana Scarwid as Joan Aldrin, wife of Buzz Aldrin.
- Rhoda Griffis as Martha Chaffee, wife of Roger Chaffee
- Cynthia Stevenson as Jane Conrad, wife of Pete Conrad
- Sally Field as Trudy Cooper, wife of L. Gordon Cooper
- Ruth Reid as Betty Grissom, wife of Gus Grissom
- Elizabeth Perkins as Marilyn Lovell, wife of James Lovell
- DeLane Matthews as Pat McDivitt, wife of James McDivitt
- Krista Adair as Jo Schirra, wife of Wally Schirra
- Debra Jo Rupp as Marilyn See, wife of Elliott See
- JoBeth Williams as Marge Slayton, wife of Deke Slayton
- Wendy Crewson as Faye Stafford, wife of Thomas Stafford
- Jo Anderson as Pat White, wife of Ed White
- Deirdre O'Connell as Barbara Young, wife of John Young

== Non-NASA personnel (non-fictional) ==
- Mason Adams as Senator Clinton P. Anderson, chairman of the Senate committee investigating the Apollo 1 fire in episode 2.
- Ronny Cox as Lee Atwood, president of North American Aviation, the Apollo spacecraft prime contractor.
- Brandon Smith as John P. Healey, Space Division Vice President, North American/Rockwell
- Andrew Rubin as Jules Bergman, ABC TV science editor
- Alan Ruck as Tom Dolan, an engineer at Chance Vought Industries who made the Moon-rendezvous report that landed at Houbolt's desk.
- Isa Totah as Farouk El-Baz, a lunar geologist who trains Apollo 15 Command Module Pilot Al Worden to recognize lunar surface features from orbit in episode 10.
- Matt Craven as Tom Kelly, Grumman engineer responsible for managing the design and construction of the Lunar Module.
- Tchéky Karyo as Georges Méliès, a French filmmaker who made the 1902 film Le Voyage dans la Lune.
- John Slattery as Senator Walter Mondale
- David Clennon as geology professor Lee Silver, who trains the Apollo 15-17 landing crews to recognize important lunar material to collect, in episodes 10 and 12.
- Janis Benson as Senator Margaret Chase Smith
- Jack Gilpin as Ted Sorensen, Deputy Counsel to President Kennedy.
- Tom Nowicki as David Bell, director of the Office of Management and Budget.
- James Rebhorn as Harrison Storms, vice president of North American Aviation, responsible for the command and service module.
- Max Wright as Günter Wendt, Pad Leader for the Mercury, Gemini and Apollo programs.
- Al Franken as Jerome Wiesner, President John F. Kennedy's science advisor in episode 1.
- Chris Hogan as Don Eyles, computer engineer MIT in episode 9.

== Cameo appearances ==
- Andrew Chaikin, the author of the 1994 book A Man on the Moon on which the miniseries is largely based, appears in episode 1 as the moderator of NBC's Meet the Press.
- Günter Wendt appears in the background, sitting to Wally Schirra's (Mark Harmon) left, as an anonymous flight controller observing a contentious review and discussion of the Apollo 7 flight plan, along with Deke Slayton (Nick Searcy), John P Healey (Brandon Smith) and several other anonymous NASA personnel, in Episode 3 "We Have Cleared the Tower".
