= Donn F. Eisele =

American astronaut (1930–1987)

Donn Eisele
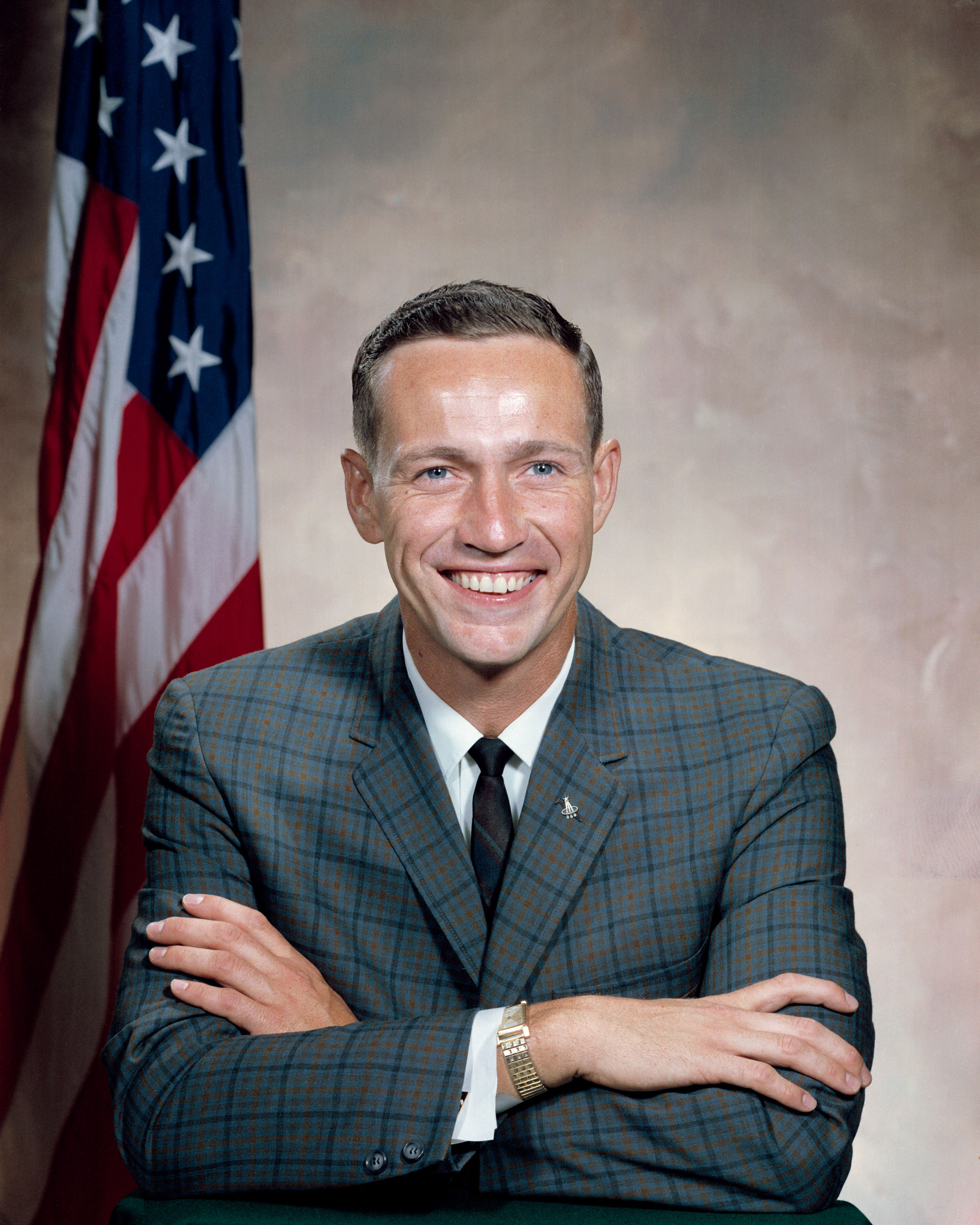
- Eisele in 1964
- Born: Donn Fulton Eisele; June 23, 1930; Columbus, Ohio, U.S.
- Died: December 1, 1987 (aged 57); Tokyo, Japan
- Resting place: Arlington National Cemetery
- Education: United States Naval Academy (BS); Air University (MS)
- Spouse(s): Harriet Hamilton (m. 1952; div. 1969) Susan Harter (m. 1969)
- Children: 6
- Awards: Distinguished Flying Cross; NASA Exceptional Service Medal; AIAA Haley Astronautics Award; National Academy of Television Arts and Sciences Special Trustees Award; NASA Distinguished Service Medal (posthumously)
- Space career

NASA astronaut
- Rank: Colonel, USAF
- Time in space: 10d 20h 8m
- Selection: NASA Group 3 (1963)
- Missions: Apollo 7
- Retired: June 1, 1970

Donn Fulton Eisele (June 23, 1930 – December 1, 1987) was a United States Air Force officer, test pilot, and later a NASA astronaut. He served as command module pilot for the Apollo 7 mission in 1968. After retiring from both NASA and the Air Force in 1972, he became the Peace Corps country director for Thailand, before moving into private business.

== Biography ==
=== Early life and education ===
Eisele was born June 23, 1930, in Columbus, Ohio, to Herman Eugene Eisele and Lee Ila June Eisele (née Davisson). He graduated from West High School in 1948. He was an active Boy Scout and earned the rank of Еagle Scout. He received a Bachelor of Science degree from the United States Naval Academy in Annapolis, Maryland, in 1952, and chose a commission in the United States Air Force. He received a Master of Science degree in Astronautics from the U.S. Air Force Institute of Technology (AFIT), Wright-Patterson AFB, Ohio, in 1960.

=== Flight experience ===
Following his commission, Eisele was sent to flight training. He was trained at Goodfellow Air Force Base, Texas, Williams Air Force Base, Arizona, and Tyndall Air Force Base, Florida. After receiving his pilot wings in 1954, Eisele served four years as an interceptor pilot in South Dakota and in Libya until 1958. He attended and graduated from the U.S. Air Force Experimental Flight Test Pilot School (Class 62A) at Edwards Air Force Base, California, in 1962; his classmates included Charles Bassett and Theodore Freeman. Eisele was a project engineer and experimental test pilot at the Air Force Special Weapons Center at Kirtland Air Force Base, New Mexico. He flew experimental test flights in support of special weapons development programs. He logged more than 4,200 hours flying time, 3,600 of which were in jet aircraft.

=== NASA career ===
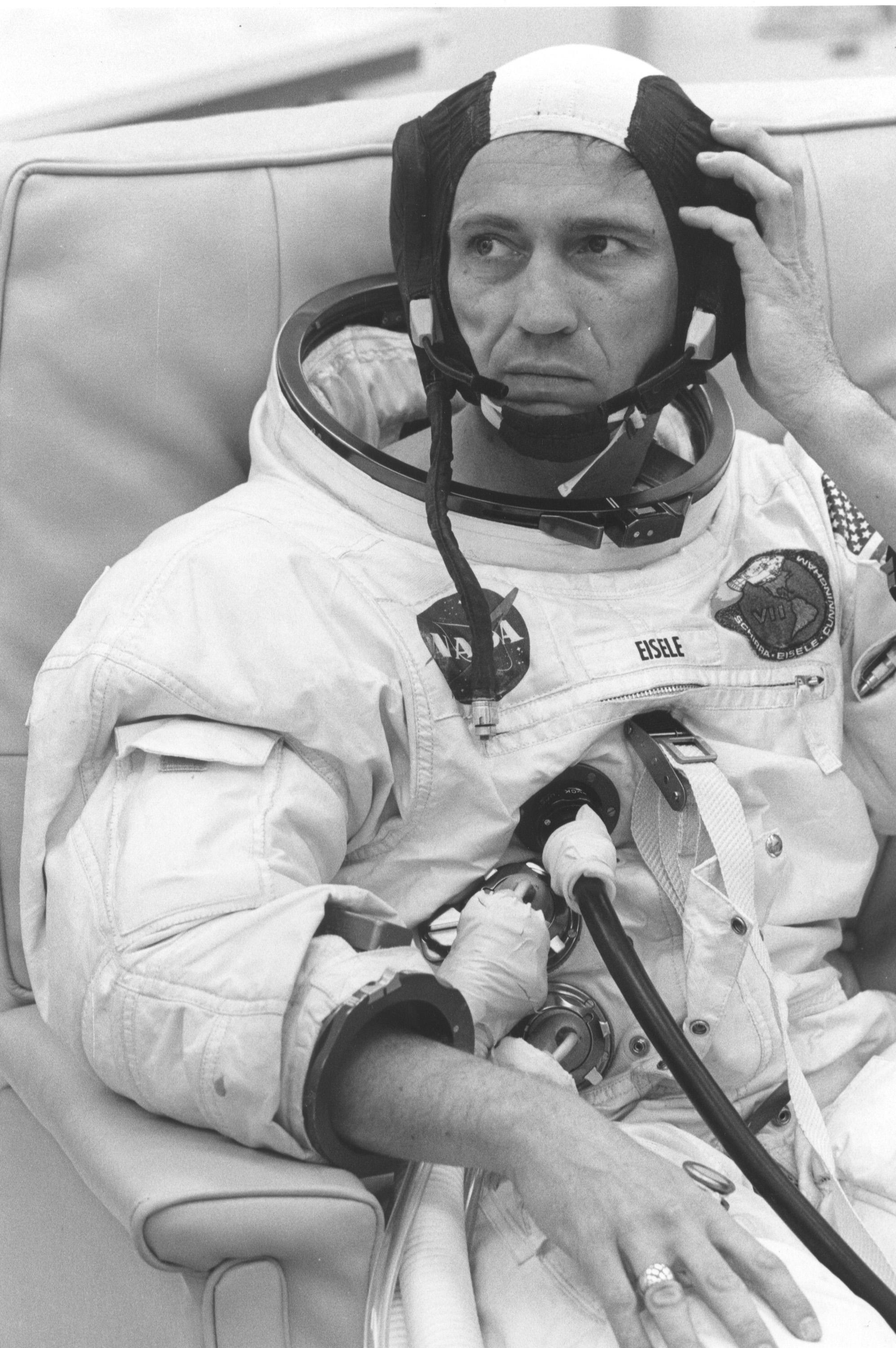
Eisele prior to launching of Apollo 7

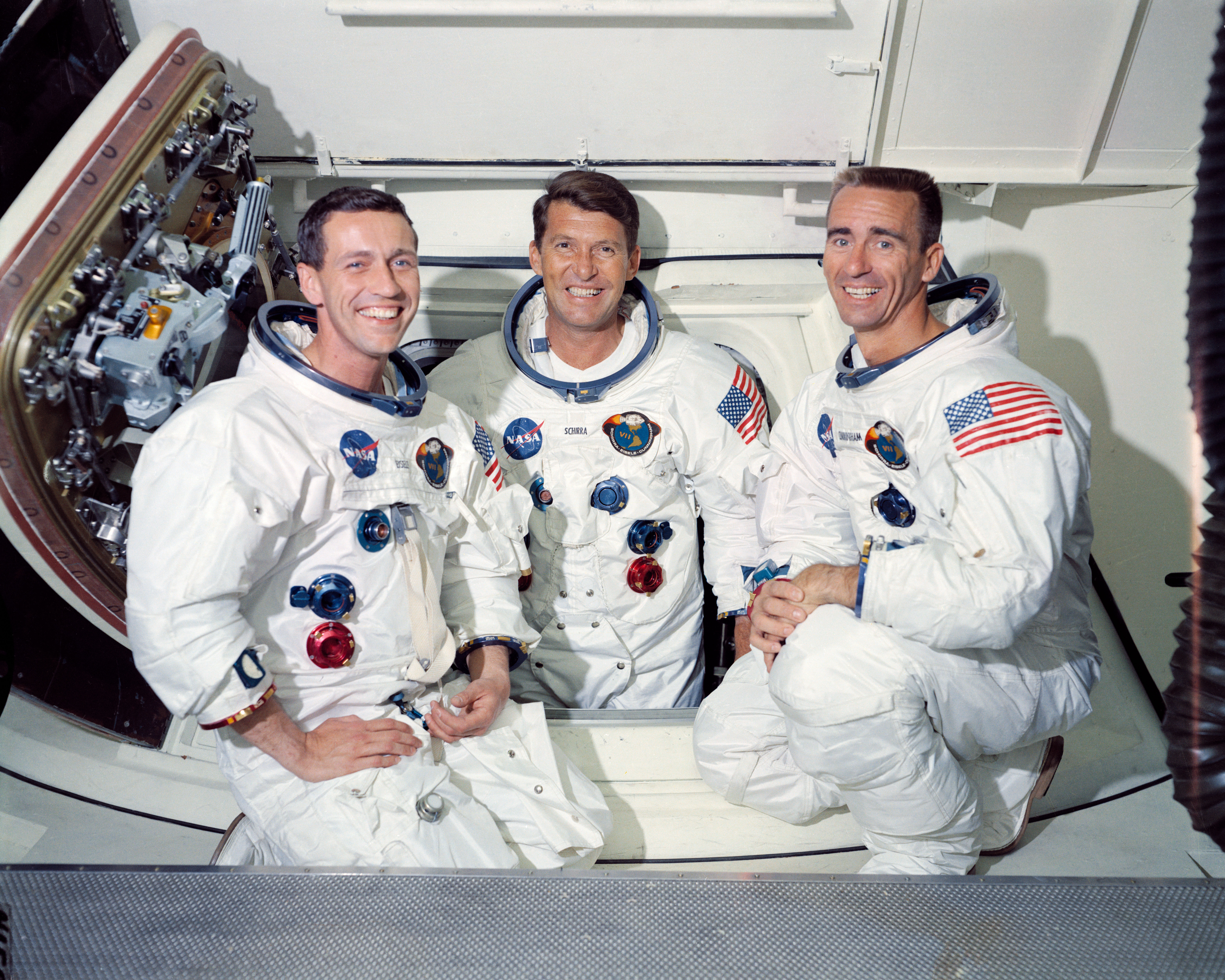
The Apollo 7 crew: Eisele (l.), Wally Schirra (c.), and Walter Cunningham (r.)

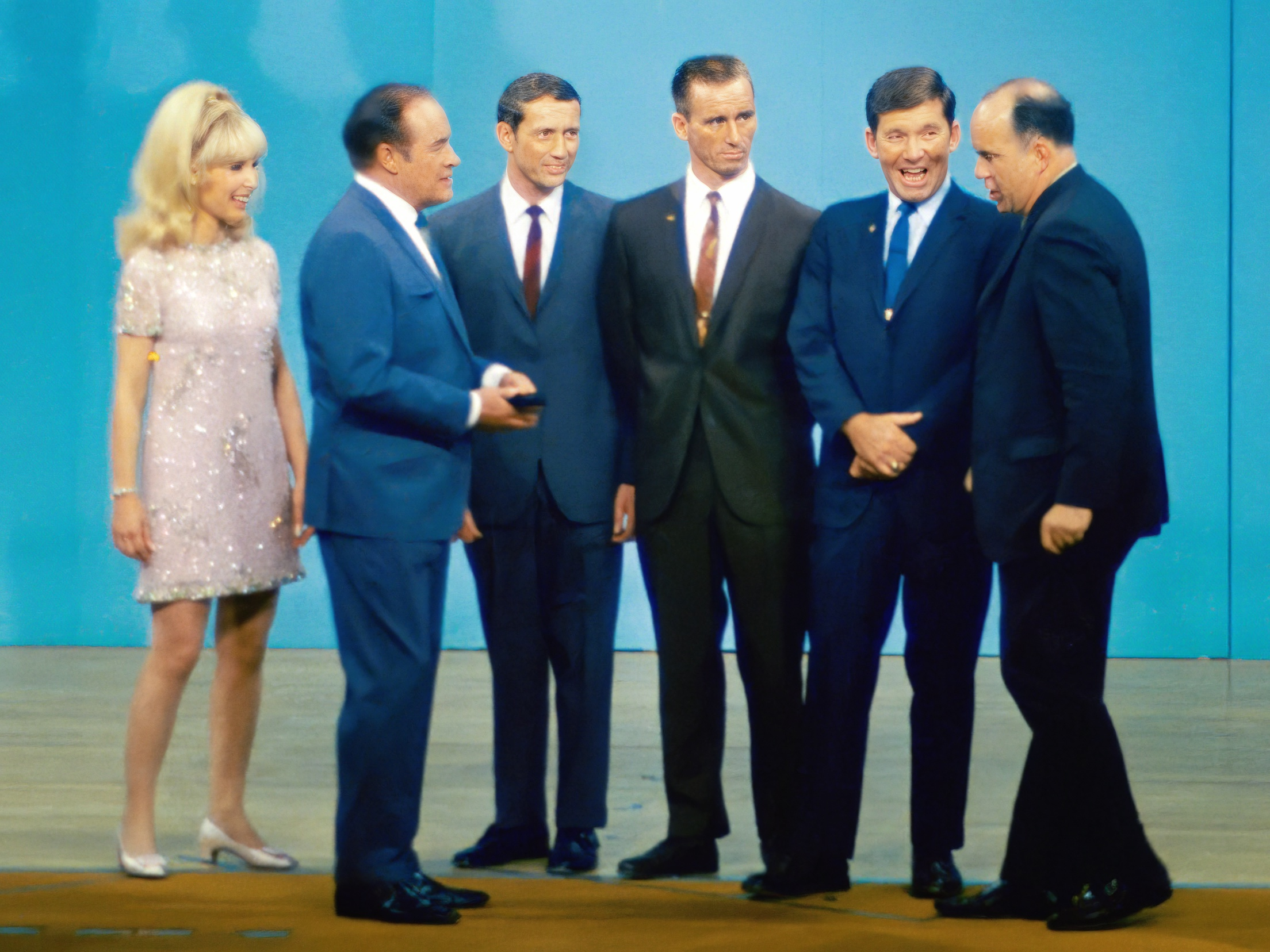
Barbara Eden, Bob Hope, the Apollo 7 astronauts, and Paul Haney (voice of Mission Control) on The Bob Hope Show (November 6, 1968)

Eisele was part of NASA's third group of astronauts, selected in October 1963. In early 1966, Eisele was quietly selected as pilot for the Apollo 1 crew, along with Command Pilot Virgil I. "Gus" Grissom and Senior Pilot Ed White. But after dislocating his shoulder twice during training in January 1966, Eisele was replaced by Roger B. Chaffee. After corrective surgery on January 27, Eisele was named to the crew for the second crewed Apollo flight, with Command Pilot Walter "Wally" Schirra and Pilot Walter Cunningham. At this time, Eisele was promoted to the Senior Pilot position.

In December 1966, Apollo 2 was canceled on the grounds that it would be an unnecessary repeat of Apollo 1, and Schirra, Eisele, and Cunningham became the backups to Grissom's crew. But after Grissom, White, and Chaffee were killed in the Apollo 1 spacecraft fire of January 27, 1967, Schirra, Eisele, and Cunningham were named to fly the first crewed Apollo mission instead. It would ultimately be called Apollo 7.

As the launch date approached, Eisele's participation was at risk; he was having an extramarital affair with a woman who would later become his second wife. Astronaut Office Chief Deke Slayton had warned the crew that they were all "expendable", and that any extramarital affairs must not become public.

Eisele remained on the crew, and on October 11, 1968, Apollo 7 was launched on an 11-day mission—the first crewed flight test of the third generation United States spacecraft. By this time, the Senior Pilot title was changed to Command Module Pilot. Together with spacecraft commander Schirra and Lunar Module Pilot Cunningham, Eisele performed simulated transposition and docking maneuvers with the upper stage of their Saturn IB launch vehicle, and acted as navigator, taking star sightings and aligning the spacecraft's guidance and navigation platform. The crew completed eight successful test firing maneuvers of the service module's propulsion engine. They also tested the performance of all spacecraft systems and broadcast the first live televised coverage of crew activities.

Apollo 7 was placed in a geocentric orbit with an apogee of 153.5 nautical miles (284.3 km; 176.6 mi) and perigee of 122.6 nautical miles (227.1 km; 141.1 mi). The 260-hour, 4.5 million mile (7.25 million km) shakedown flight was successfully concluded on October 22, 1968, with splashdown occurring in the Atlantic, 8 miles (15 km) from the carrier USS Essex and only 0.3 miles (0.48 km; 480 m) from the predicted target. Eisele logged 260 hours in space.

Eisele served as backup Command Module Pilot for the 1969 Apollo 10 flight. Eisele resigned from the Astronaut Office in 1970 and became technical assistant for crewed spaceflight at the NASA Langley Research Center, a position he occupied until retiring from both NASA and the Air Force in 1972.

=== Post-NASA career ===
In July 1972, Eisele became Country Director of the U.S. Peace Corps in Thailand. Returning from Thailand two years later, he became Sales Manager for Marion Power Shovel, a division of Dresser Industries. Eisele then handled private and corporate accounts for the investment firm of Oppenheimer & Company.

In 1980, Eisele moved to Wilton Manors, Florida. In 1981, Eisele was appointed to a vacant seat on the Wilton Manors City Commission, and served in that political office for roughly one year. After Eisele's death, the City of Wilton Manors named Donn Eisele Park in his memory.

Eisele was a guide in the 1986 Concorde Comet Chase flights out of Miami and New York City.

=== Death ===
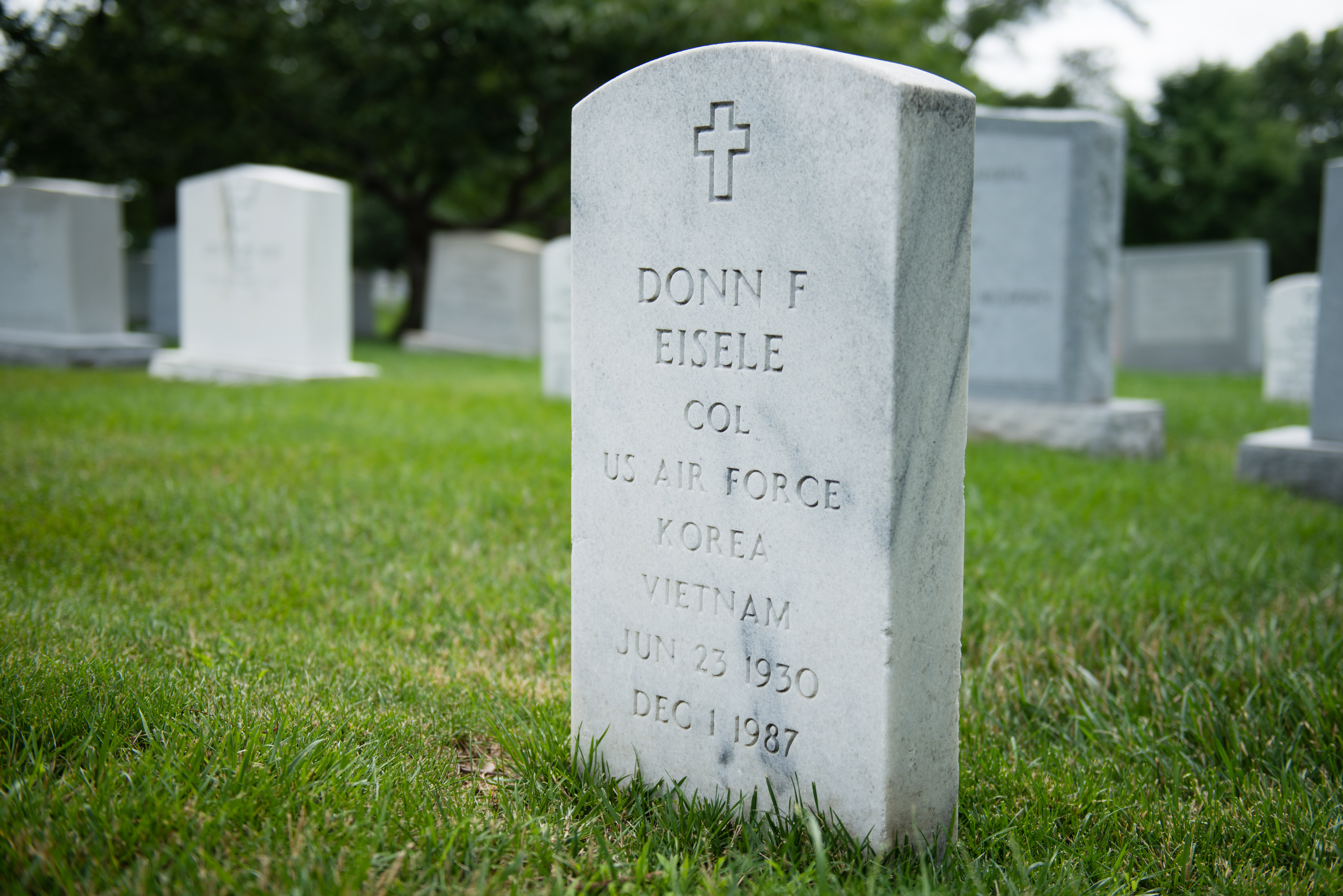
Grave of Donn Eisele at Arlington National Cemetery

In 1987, at the age of 57, Eisele died of a heart attack while on a business trip to Tokyo, Japan, where he was to attend the opening of a new Space Camp patterned on the one at the U.S. Space & Rocket Center in Huntsville, Alabama. Eisele was cremated in Japan, and his ashes were buried in Arlington National Cemetery with full military honors.

== Organizations ==
Eisele was an Eagle Scout, a member of Tau Beta Pi, and a Freemason, belonging to Luther B. Turner Lodge # 732 in Columbus, Ohio.

== Awards and honors ==
Among the honors he received during his career were the NASA Exceptional Service Medal, the Air Force Senior Pilot Astronaut Wings, and the Air Force Distinguished Flying Cross. He was a co-recipient of the AIAA 1969 Haley Astronautics Award and was presented the National Academy of Television Arts and Sciences Special Trustees Award in 1969.

Eisele was a part of a group of Apollo astronauts to be inducted into the International Space Hall of Fame in 1983. He was one of 24 Apollo astronauts who were inducted into the U.S. Astronaut Hall of Fame in 1997. In 2008, NASA posthumously awarded Eisele the NASA Distinguished Service Medal for his Apollo 7 mission.

== Legacy ==
A family-approved account of Donn Eisele's life appears in the 2007 book In the Shadow of the Moon. Eisele's posthumously discovered memoir Apollo Pilot was published by University of Nebraska Press in 2017, in the Outward Odyssey series.

In the 1998 HBO miniseries From the Earth to the Moon, Eisele was portrayed by John Mese. In the final three episodes of the 2015 ABC television series The Astronaut Wives Club, Eisele was portrayed by Ryan Doom.

Susan Eisele Black donated a sample of a Moon rock to Broward County Main Library on behalf of her late husband, on October 23, 2007. Broward County Library, located in Fort Lauderdale, Florida, is the only library in the United States to have a lunar rock on display. The precious Moon rock is typically exhibited at science museums and schools.

== See also ==
- List of Eagle Scouts
- The Astronaut Monument
