= Apollo 7 =

First crewed flight of the Apollo space program

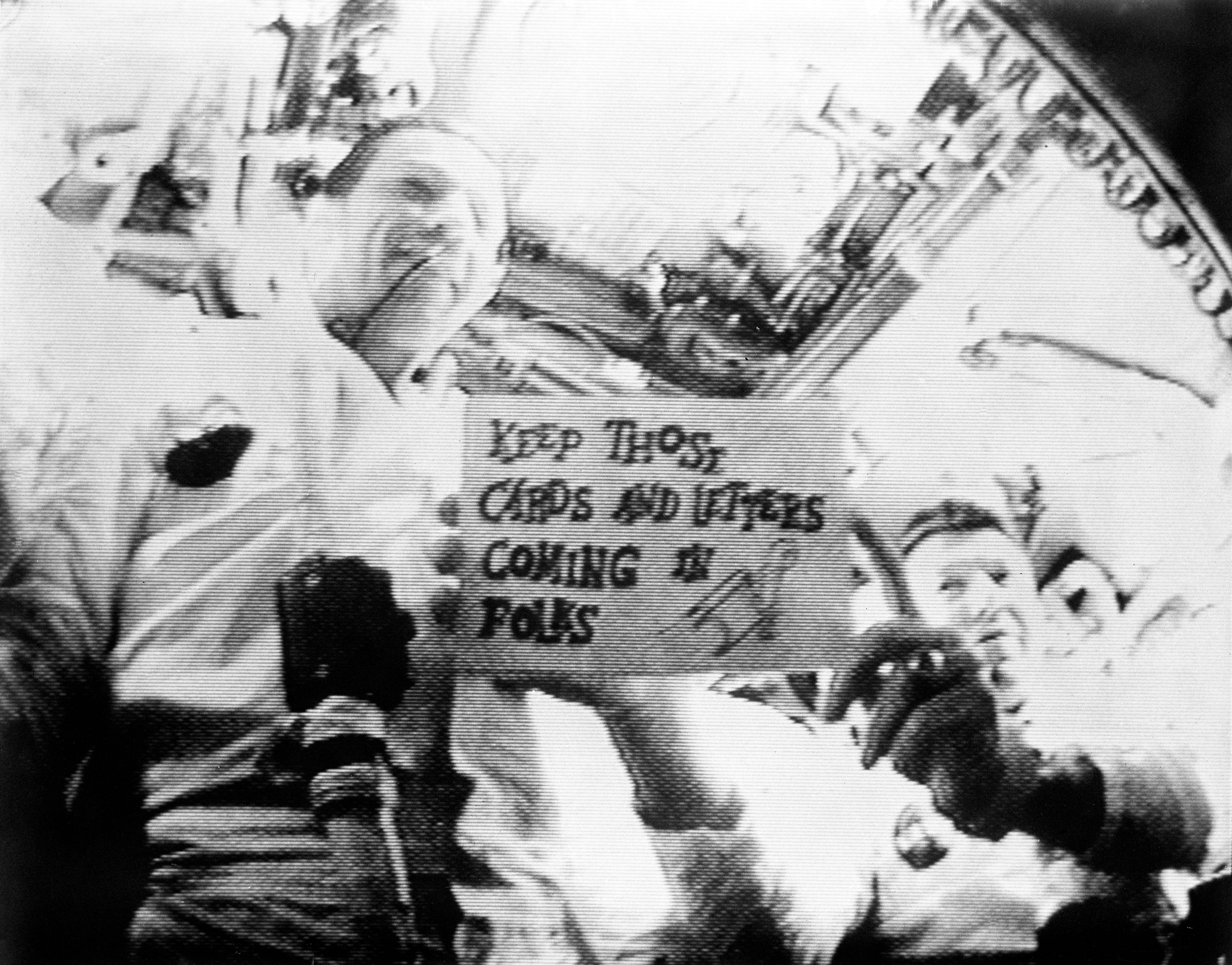
- Apollo 7 transmitted the first live television broadcast aboard a crewed American spacecraft.
- Mission type: Crewed Earth orbital CSM flight (C)
- Operator: NASA
- COSPAR ID: 1968-089A (craft), 1968-089B (S-IVB)
- SATCAT no.: 3486
- Mission duration: 10 days, 20 hours, 9 minutes, 3 seconds
- Orbits completed: 163

Spacecraft properties
- Spacecraft: Apollo CSM-101
- Manufacturer: North American Rockwell
- Launch mass: 36,419 pounds (16,519 kg)
- Landing mass: 11,409 pounds (5,175 kg)

Crew
- Crew size: 3
- Members: Walter M. Schirra; Donn F. Eisele; R. Walter Cunningham
- Callsign: Apollo 7

Start of mission
- Launch date: October 11, 1968, 15:02:45 UTC
- Rocket: Saturn IB SA-205
- Launch site: Cape Kennedy LC-34

End of mission
- Recovered by: USS Essex
- Landing date: October 22, 1968, 11:11:48 UTC
- Landing site: North Atlantic Ocean; 27°32′N 64°04′W

Orbital parameters
- Reference system: Geocentric
- Regime: Low Earth orbit
- Perigee altitude: 227 kilometers (123 nmi)
- Apogee altitude: 301 kilometers (163 nmi)
- Inclination: 31.6 degrees
- Period: 89.55 minutes
- Epoch: October 13, 1968
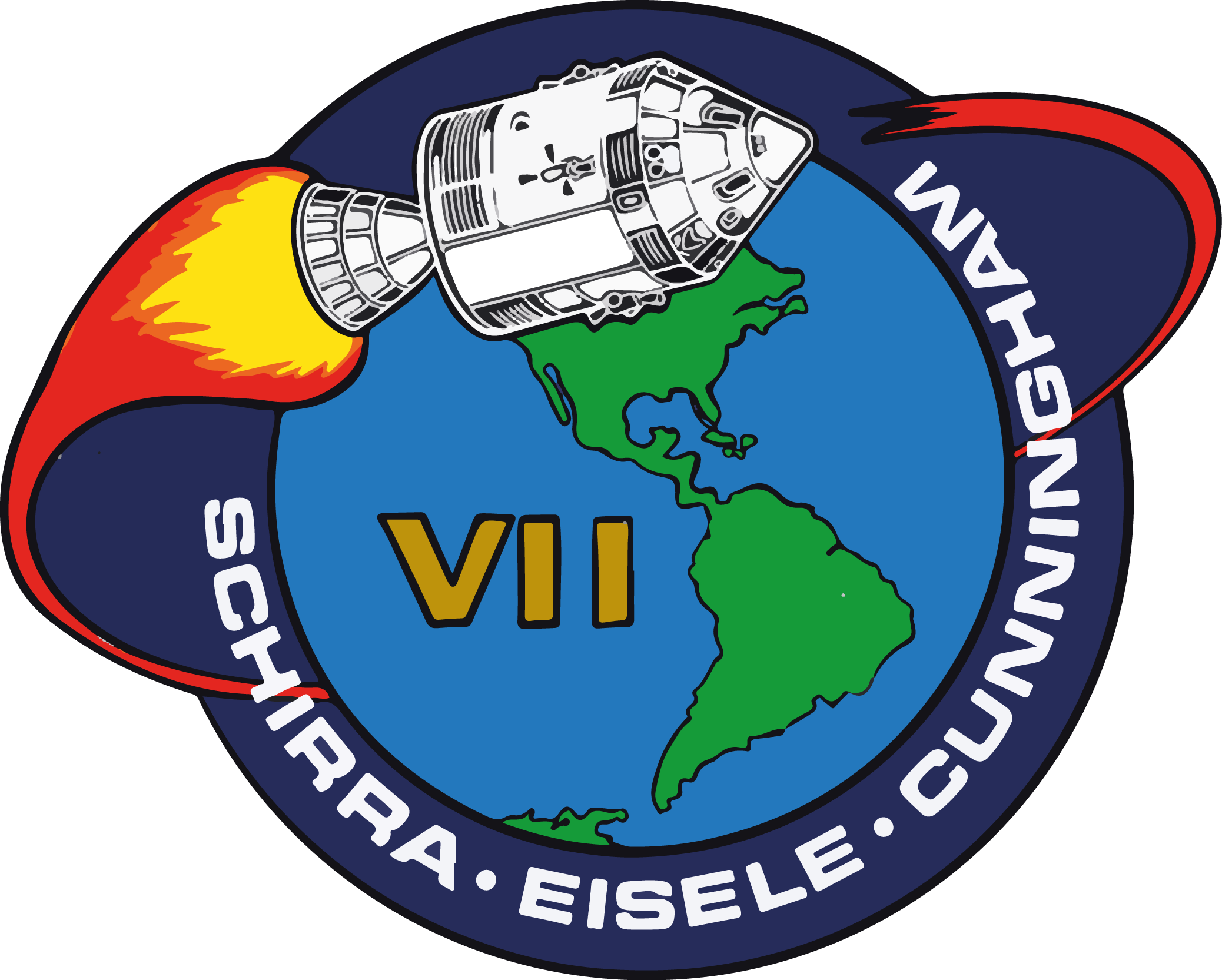
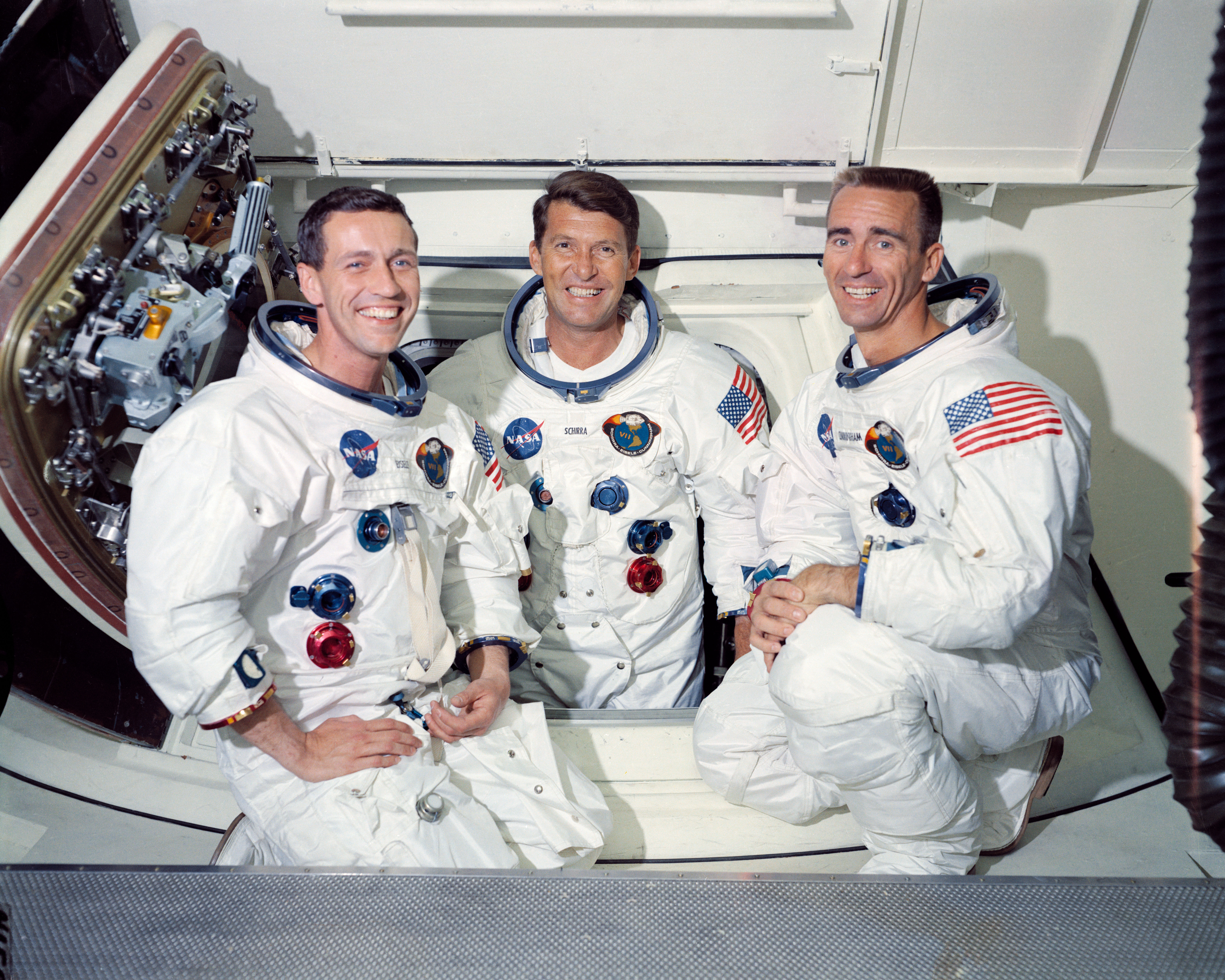
- Left to right: Eisele, Schirra, Cunningham Apollo program

Apollo 7 (October 11–22, 1968) was the first crewed flight in NASA's Apollo program, and saw the resumption of human spaceflight by the agency after the fire that killed the three Apollo 1 astronauts during a launch rehearsal test on January 27, 1967. The Apollo 7 crew was commanded by Walter M. Schirra, with Command Module Pilot Donn F. Eisele and Lunar Module pilot R. Walter Cunningham (so designated even though Apollo 7 did not carry a Lunar Module).

The three astronauts were originally designated for the second crewed Apollo flight, and then as backups for Apollo 1. After the Apollo 1 fire, crewed flights were suspended while the cause of the accident was investigated and improvements made to the spacecraft and safety procedures, and uncrewed test flights made. Determined to prevent a repetition of the fire, the crew spent long periods monitoring the construction of their Apollo command and service modules (CSM). Training continued over much of the 21-month pause that followed the Apollo 1 disaster.

Apollo 7 was launched on October 11, 1968, from Cape Kennedy Air Force Station, Florida, and splashed down in the Atlantic Ocean eleven days later. Extensive testing of the CSM took place, and also the first live television broadcast from an American spacecraft. Despite tension between the crew and ground controllers, the mission was a complete technical success, giving NASA the confidence to send Apollo 8 into orbit around the Moon two months later. In part because of these tensions, none of the crew flew in space again, though Schirra had already announced he would retire from NASA after the flight. Apollo 7 fulfilled Apollo 1's mission of testing the CSM in low Earth orbit, and was a significant step towards NASA's goal of landing astronauts on the Moon.

== Background and personnel ==
Apollo 7: Manned Space Flight Film Report (1968) Official NASA Apollo 7 information film reel

Position	Astronaut
Commander	Walter M. Schirra; Third and last spaceflight
Command Module Pilot	Donn F. Eisele; Only spaceflight
Lunar Module Pilot (Note: "Lunar Module Pilot" was the official title used for the third pilot position in Block II missions, regardless of whether the LM spacecraft was present or not.)	R. Walter Cunningham; Only spaceflight

Schirra, one of the original "Mercury Seven" astronauts, graduated from the United States Naval Academy in 1945. He flew Mercury-Atlas 8 in 1962, the fifth crewed flight of Project Mercury and the third to reach orbit, and in 1965 was the command pilot for Gemini 6A. He was a 45-year-old captain in the Navy at the time of Apollo 7. Eisele graduated from the Naval Academy in 1952 with a B.S. in aeronautics. He elected to be commissioned in the Air Force, and was a 38-year-old major at the time of Apollo 7. Cunningham joined the U.S. Navy in 1951, began flight training the following year, and served in a Marine flight squadron from 1953 to 1956, and was a civilian, aged 36, serving in the Marine Corps reserves with a rank of major, at the time of Apollo 7. He received degrees in physics from UCLA, a B.A. in 1960 and an M.A. in 1961. Both Eisele and Cunningham were selected as part of the third group of astronauts in 1963.

Eisele was originally slotted for a position on Gus Grissom's Apollo 1 crew along with Ed White, but days prior to the official announcement on March 25, 1966, Eisele sustained a shoulder injury that would require surgery. Instead, Roger Chaffee was given the position and Eisele was reassigned to Schirra's crew.

Schirra, Eisele, and Cunningham were first named as an Apollo crew on September 29, 1966. They were to fly a second Earth orbital test of the Apollo Command Module (CM). Although delighted as a rookie to be assigned to a prime crew without having served as a backup, Cunningham was troubled by the fact that a second Earth orbital test flight, dubbed Apollo 2, seemed unnecessary if Apollo 1 was successful. He learned later that Director of Flight Crew Operations Deke Slayton, another of the Mercury Seven who had been grounded for medical reasons and supervised the astronauts, planned, with Schirra's support, to command the mission if he gained medical clearance. When this was not forthcoming, Schirra remained in command of the crew, and in November 1966, Apollo 2 was cancelled and Schirra's crew assigned as backup to Grissom's. Thomas P. Stafford—assigned at that point as the backup commander of the second orbital test—stated that the cancellation followed Schirra and his crew submitting a list of demands to NASA management (Schirra wanted the mission to include a lunar module and a CM capable of docking with it), and that the assignment as backups left Schirra complaining that Slayton and Chief Astronaut Alan Shepard had destroyed his career.

On January 27, 1967, Grissom's crew was conducting a launch-pad test for their planned February 21 mission, when a fire broke out in the cabin, killing all three men. A complete safety review of the Apollo program followed. Soon after the fire, Slayton asked Schirra, Eisele and Cunningham to fly the first mission after the pause. Apollo 7 would use the Block II spacecraft designed for the lunar missions, as opposed to the Block I CSM used for Apollo 1, which was intended only to be used for the early Earth-orbit missions, as it lacked the capability of docking with a lunar module. The CM and astronauts' spacesuits had been extensively redesigned, to reduce any chance of a repeat of the accident which killed the first crew. Schirra's crew would test the life support, propulsion, guidance and control systems during this "open-ended" mission (meaning it would be extended as it passed each test). The duration was limited to 11 days, reduced from the original 14-day limit for Apollo 1.

The backup crew consisted of Stafford as commander, John W. Young as command module pilot, and Eugene A. Cernan as lunar module pilot. They became the prime crew of Apollo 10. Ronald E. Evans, John L. 'Jack' Swigert, and Edward G. Givens were assigned to the support crew for the mission. Givens died in a car accident on June 6, 1967, and William R. Pogue was assigned as his replacement. Evans was involved in hardware testing at Kennedy Space Center (KSC). Swigert was the launch capsule communicator (CAPCOM) and worked on the mission's operational aspects. Pogue spent time modifying procedures. The support crew also filled in when the primary and backup crews were unavailable.

CAPCOMs, the person in Mission Control responsible for communicating with the spacecraft (then always an astronaut) were Evans, Pogue, Stafford, Swigert, Young and Cernan. Flight directors were Glynn Lunney, Gene Kranz and Gerry Griffin.

== Preparation ==
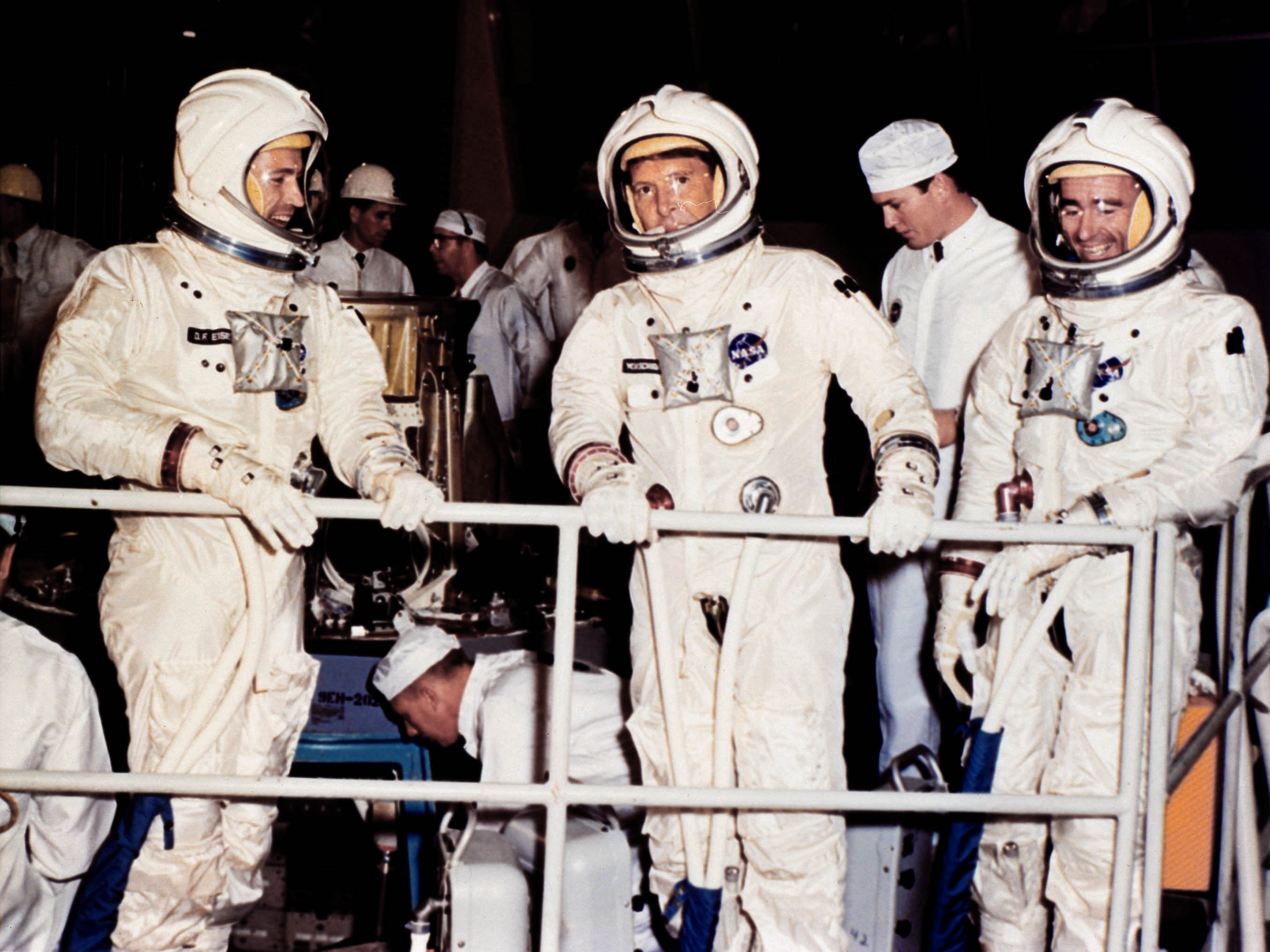
Schirra's crew in training for Apollo 2, 1966

According to Cunningham, Schirra originally had limited interest in making a third spaceflight, beginning to focus on his post-NASA career. Flying the first mission after the fire changed things: "Wally Schirra was being pictured as the man chosen to rescue the manned space program. And that was a task worthy of Wally's interest." Eisele noted, "coming on the heels of the fire, we knew the fate and future of the entire manned space program—not to mention our own skins—was riding on the success or failure of Apollo 7."

Given the circumstances of the fire, the crew initially had little confidence in the staff at North American Aviation's plant at Downey, California, who built the Apollo command modules, and they were determined to follow their craft every step of the way through construction and testing. This interfered with training, but the simulators of the CM were not yet ready, and they knew it would be a long time until they launched. They spent long periods at Downey. Simulators were constructed at Houston's Manned Spacecraft Center and at KSC in Florida. Once these were available for use, the crew had difficulty finding enough time to do everything, even with the help of the backup and support crews; the crew often worked 12 or 14 hours per day. After the CM was completed and shipped to KSC, the focus of the crew's training shifted to Florida, though they went to Houston for planning and technical meetings. Rather than return to their Houston homes for the weekend, they often had to remain at KSC in order to participate in training or spacecraft testing. According to former astronaut Tom Jones in a 2018 article, Schirra, "with indisputable evidence of the risks his crew would be taking, now had immense leverage with management at NASA and North American, and he used it. In conference rooms or on the spacecraft assembly line, Schirra got his way."

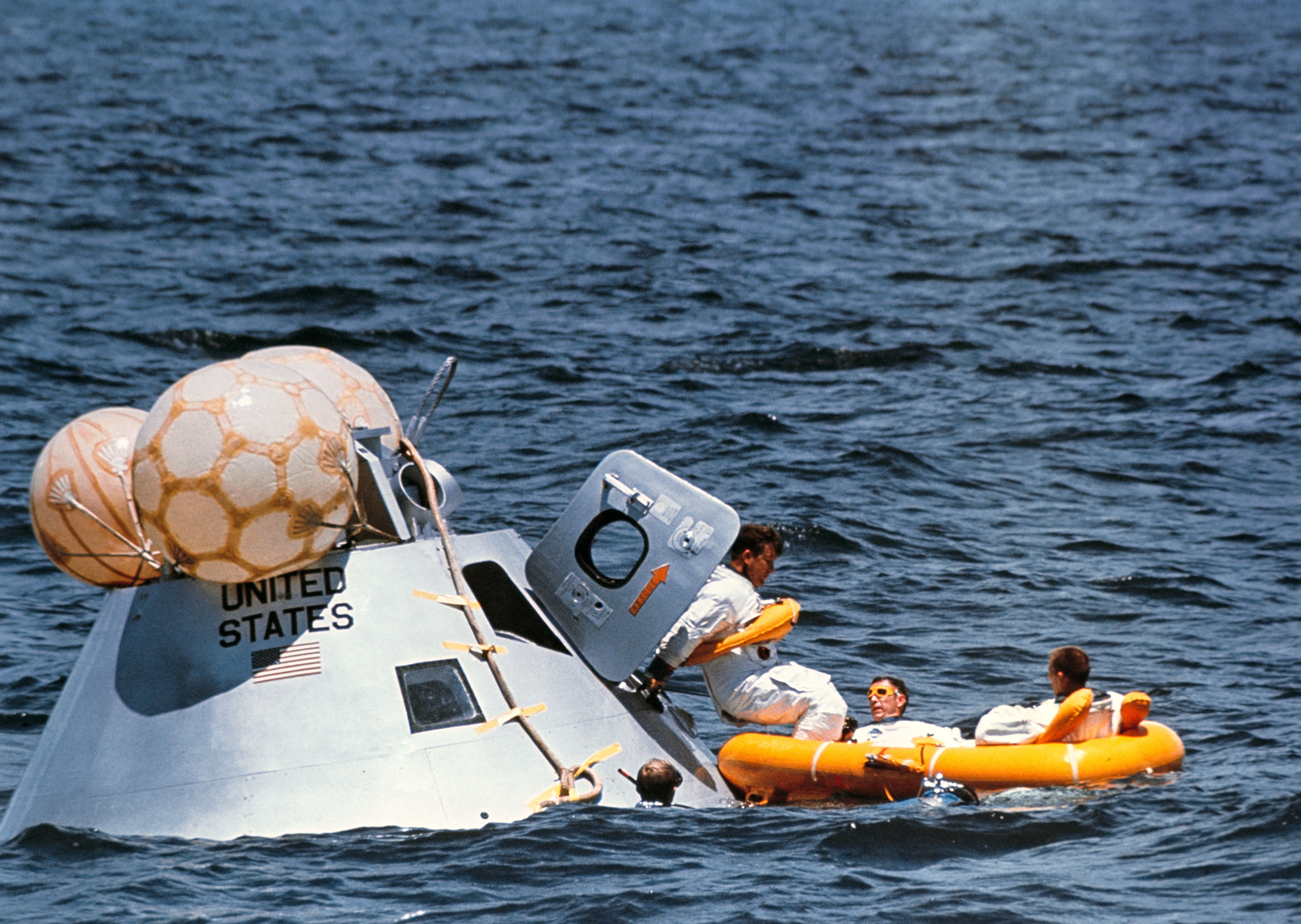
The crew during water egress training

The Apollo 7 crew spent five hours in training for every hour they could expect to remain aboard if the mission went its full eleven days. In addition, they attended technical briefings and pilots' meetings, and studied on their own. They undertook launch pad evacuation training, water egress training to exit the vehicle after splashdown, and learned to use firefighting equipment. They trained on the Apollo Guidance Computer at MIT. Each crew member spent 160 hours in CM simulations, in some of which Mission Control in Houston participated live. The "plugs out" test—the test that had killed the Apollo 1 crew—was conducted with the prime crew in the spacecraft, but with the hatch open. One reason the Apollo 1 crew had died was because it was impossible to open the inward-opening hatch before the fire raced through the cabin; this was changed for Apollo 7.

Command modules similar to that used on Apollo 7 were subjected to tests in the run-up to the mission. A three-astronaut crew (Joseph P. Kerwin, Vance D. Brand and Joe H. Engle) was inside a CM that was placed in a vacuum chamber at the Manned Spaceflight Center in Houston for eight days in June 1968 to test spacecraft systems. Another crew (James Lovell, Stuart Roosa and Charles M. Duke) spent 48 hours at sea aboard a CM lowered into the Gulf of Mexico from a naval vessel in April 1968, to test how systems would respond to seawater. Further tests were conducted the following month in a tank at Houston. Fires were set aboard a boilerplate CM using various atmospheric compositions and pressures. The results led to the decision to use 60 percent oxygen and 40 percent nitrogen within the CM at launch, which would be replaced with a lower pressure of pure oxygen within four hours, as providing adequate fire protection. Other boilerplate spacecraft were subjected to drops to test parachutes, and to simulate the likely damage if a CM came down on land. All results were satisfactory.

During the run-up to the mission, the Soviets sent uncrewed probes Zond 4 and Zond 5 (Zond 5 carried two tortoises) around the Moon, seeming to foreshadow a circumlunar crewed mission. NASA's Lunar Module (LM) was suffering delays, and Apollo Program Spacecraft Manager George Low proposed that if Apollo 7 was a success, that Apollo 8 go to lunar orbit without a LM. The acceptance of Low's proposal raised the stakes for Apollo 7. According to Stafford, Schirra "clearly felt the full weight of the program riding on a successful mission and as a result became more openly critical and more sarcastic."

Throughout the Mercury and Gemini programs, McDonnell Aircraft engineer Guenter Wendt led the spacecraft launch pad teams, with ultimate responsibility for condition of the spacecraft at launch. He earned the astronauts' respect and admiration, including Schirra's. However, the spacecraft contractor had changed from McDonnell (Mercury and Gemini) to North American (Apollo), so Wendt was not the pad leader for Apollo 1. So adamant was Schirra in his desire to have Wendt back as pad leader for his Apollo flight, that he got his boss Slayton to persuade North American management to hire Wendt away from McDonnell, and Schirra personally lobbied North American's launch operations manager to change Wendt's shift from midnight to day so he could be pad leader for Apollo 7. Wendt remained as pad leader for the entire Apollo program. When he departed the spacecraft area as the pad was evacuated prior to launch, after Cunningham said, "I think Guenter's going", Eisele responded "Yes, I think Guenter went." (Note: A pun on his last name, Wendt (pronounced "went"))

== Hardware ==
=== Spacecraft ===
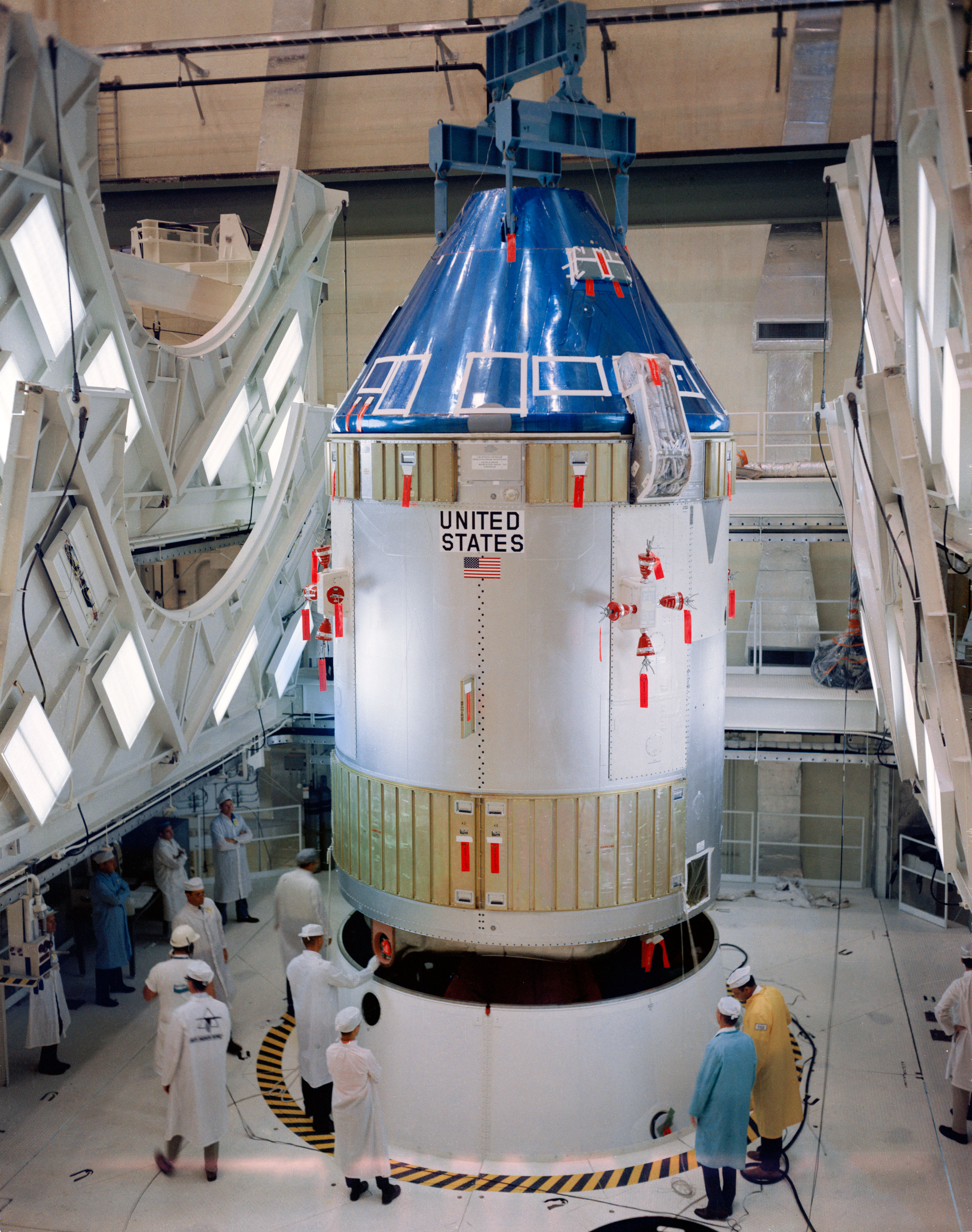
CSM-101 pre-launch

The Apollo 7 spacecraft included Command and Service Module 101 (CSM-101), the first Block II CSM to be flown. The Block II craft had the capability of docking with a LM, though none was flown on Apollo 7. The spacecraft also included the launch escape system and a spacecraft-lunar module adapter (SLA, numbered as SLA-5), though the latter included no LM and instead provided a mating structure between the SM and the S-IVB's Instrument Unit, with a structural stiffener substituted for the LM. The launch escape system was jettisoned after S-IVB ignition, while the SLA was left behind on the spent S-IVB when the CSM separated from it in orbit.

Following the Apollo 1 fire, the Block II CSM was extensively redesigned—more than 1,800 changes were recommended, of which 1,300 were implemented for Apollo 7. Prominent among these was the new aluminum and fiberglass outward-opening hatch, which the crew could open in seven seconds from within, and the pad crew in ten seconds from outside. Other changes included replacement of aluminum tubing in the high-pressure oxygen system with stainless steel, replacement of flammable materials with non-flammable (including changing plastic switches for metal ones) and, for crew protection in the event of a fire, an emergency oxygen system to shield them from toxic fumes, as well as firefighting equipment.

After the Gemini 3 craft was dubbed Molly Brown by Grissom, NASA forbade naming spacecraft. Despite this prohibition, Schirra wanted to name his ship "Phoenix," but NASA refused him permission. The first CM to be given a call sign other than the mission designation would be that of Apollo 9, which carried a LM that would separate from it and then re-dock, necessitating distinct call signs for the two vehicles.

=== Launch vehicle ===
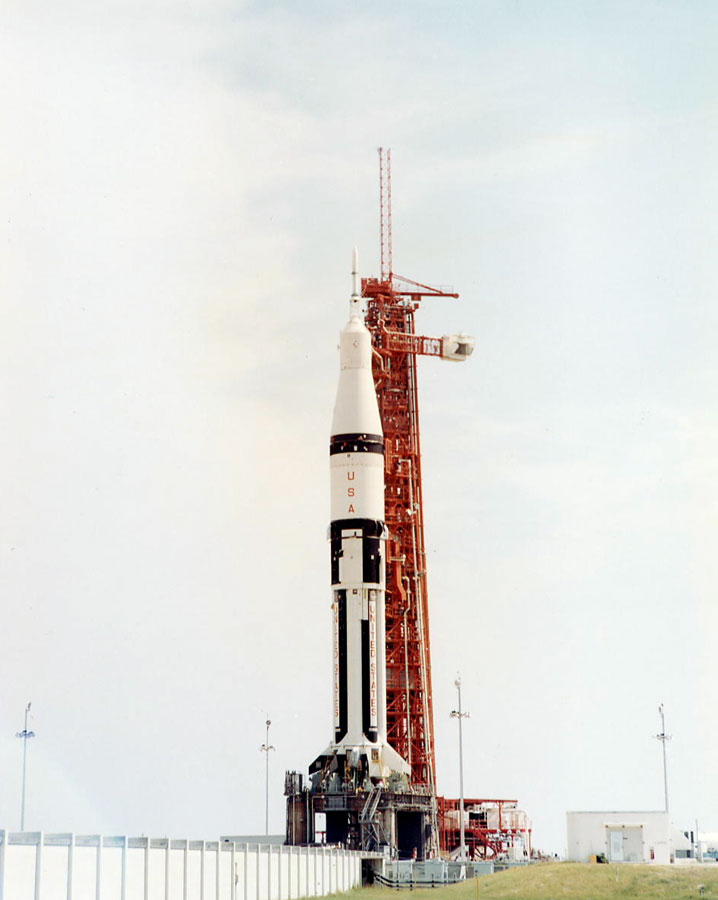
Apollo 7's Saturn IB, SA-205, at Launch Complex 34

Since it flew in low Earth orbit and did not include a LM, Apollo 7 was launched with the Saturn IB booster rather than the much larger and more powerful Saturn V. That Saturn IB was designated SA-205, and was the fifth Saturn IB to be flown—the earlier ones did not carry crews into space. It differed from its predecessors in that stronger propellant lines to the augmented spark igniter in the J-2 engines had been installed, so as to prevent a repetition of the early shutdown that had occurred on the uncrewed Apollo 6 flight; postflight analysis had shown that the propellant lines to the J-2 engines, also used in the Saturn V tested on Apollo 6, had leaked.

The Saturn IB was a two-stage rocket, with the second stage an S-IVB similar to the third stage of the Saturn V, the rocket used by all later Apollo missions. The Saturn IB was used after the close of the Apollo Program to bring crews in Apollo CSMs to Skylab, and for the Apollo–Soyuz Test Project.

Apollo 7 was the only crewed Apollo mission to launch from Cape Kennedy Air Force Station's Launch Complex 34. All subsequent Apollo and Skylab spacecraft flights (including Apollo–Soyuz) were launched from Launch Complex 39 at the nearby Kennedy Space Center. Launch Complex 34 was declared redundant and decommissioned in 1969, making Apollo 7 the last human spaceflight mission to launch from the Cape Air Force Station in the 20th century.

== Mission highlights ==
The main purposes of the Apollo 7 flight were to show that the Block II CM would be habitable and reliable over the length of time required for a lunar mission, to show that the service propulsion system (SPS, the spacecraft's main engine) and the CM's guidance systems could perform a rendezvous in orbit, and later make a precision reentry and splashdown. In addition, there were a number of specific objectives, including evaluating the communications systems and the accuracy of onboard systems such as the propellant tank gauges. Many of the activities aimed at gathering these data were scheduled for early in the mission, so that if the mission was terminated prematurely, they would already have been completed, allowing for fixes to be made prior to the next Apollo flight.

=== Launch and testing ===
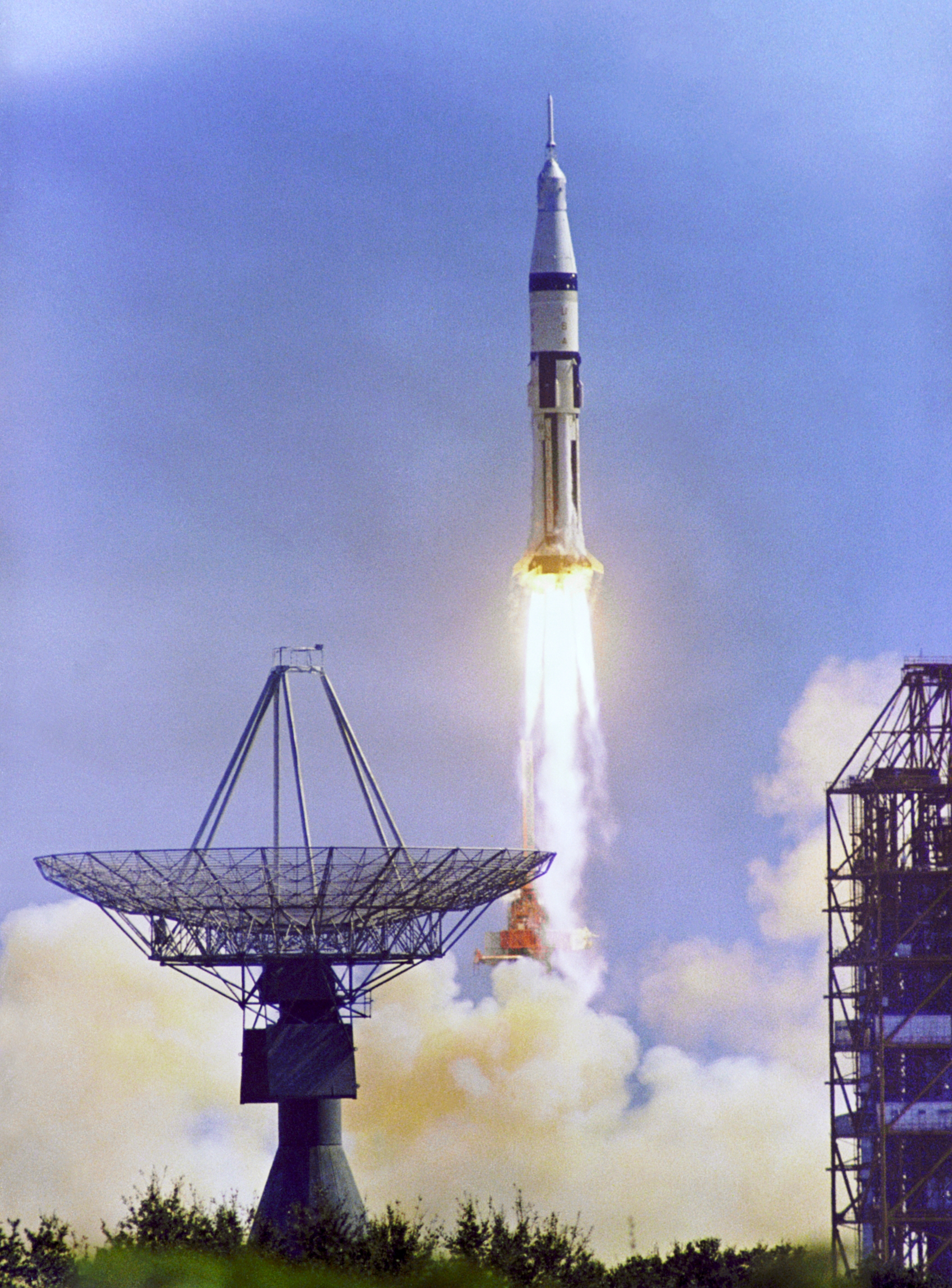
Apollo 7's liftoff

Apollo 7, the first crewed American space flight in 22 months, launched from Launch Complex 34 at 11:02:45 am EDT (15:02:45 UTC) on Friday, October 11, 1968.

During the countdown, the wind was blowing in from the east. Launching under these weather conditions was in violation of safety rules, since in the event of a launch vehicle malfunction and abort, the CM might be blown back over land instead of making the usual water landing. Apollo 7 was equipped with the old Apollo 1-style crew couches, which provided less protection than later ones. Schirra later related that he felt the launch should have been scrubbed, but managers waived the rule and he yielded under pressure.

Liftoff proceeded flawlessly; the Saturn IB performed well on its first crewed launch and there were no significant anomalies during the boost phase. The astronauts described it as very smooth. The ascent made the 45-year-old Schirra the oldest person to that point to enter space, and, as it proved, the only astronaut to fly Mercury, Gemini and Apollo missions.

Within the first three hours of flight, the astronauts performed two actions which simulated what would be required on a lunar mission. First, they maneuvered the craft with the S-IVB still attached, as would be required for the burn that would take lunar missions to the Moon. Then, after separation from the S-IVB, Schirra turned the CSM around and approached a docking target painted on the S-IVB, simulating the docking maneuver with the lunar module on Moon-bound missions prior to extracting the combined craft. Cunningham reported that the hinged SLA panels on the S-IVB had not fully opened, which CAPCOM Tom Stafford likened to the "angry alligator" from his Gemini 9A flight. Partially open panels would have presented a collision hazard on flights with an LM, so on subsequent missions the SLA panels were jettisoned after the CSM had separated. After station keeping with the S-IVB for 20 minutes, Schirra let it drift away, putting 76 miles (122 km) between the CSM and it in preparation for the following day's rendezvous attempt.

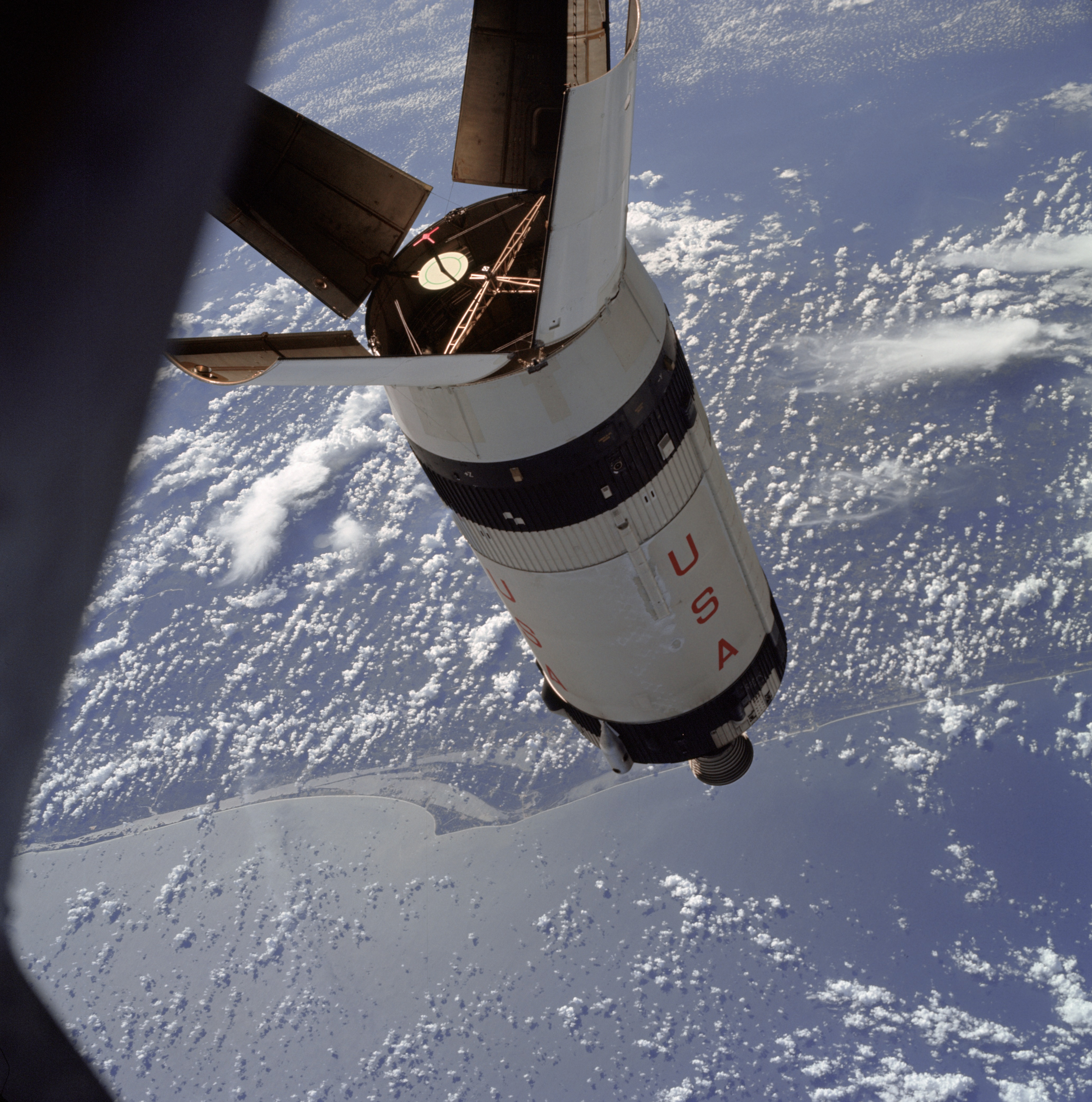
Apollo 7 S-IVB rocket stage in orbit

The astronauts also enjoyed a hot lunch, the first hot meal prepared on an American spacecraft. Schirra had brought instant coffee along over the opposition of NASA doctors, who argued it added nothing nutritionally. Five hours after launch, he reported having, and enjoying, his first plastic bag full of coffee.

The purpose of the rendezvous was to demonstrate the CSM's ability to match orbits with and rescue a LM after an aborted lunar landing attempt, or following liftoff from the lunar surface. This was to occur on the second day; but by the end of the first, Schirra had reported he had a cold, and, despite Slayton coming on the loop to argue in favor, declined Mission Control's request that the crew power up and test the onboard television camera prior to the rendezvous, citing the cold, that the crew had not eaten, and that there was already a very full schedule.

The rendezvous was complicated by the fact that the Apollo 7 spacecraft lacked a rendezvous radar, something the Moon-bound missions would have. The SPS, the engine that would be needed to send later Apollo CSMs into and out of lunar orbit, had been fired only on a test stand. Although the astronauts were confident it would work, they were concerned it might fire in an unexpected manner, necessitating an early end to the mission. The burns would be computed from the ground but the final work in maneuvering up to the S-IVB would require Eisele to use the telescope and sextant to compute the final burns, with Schirra applying the ship's reaction control system (RCS) thrusters. Eisele was startled by the violent jolt caused by activating the SPS. The thrust caused Schirra to yell, "Yabba dabba doo!" in reference to The Flintstones cartoon. Schirra eased the craft close to the S-IVB, which was tumbling out of control, successfully completing the rendezvous.

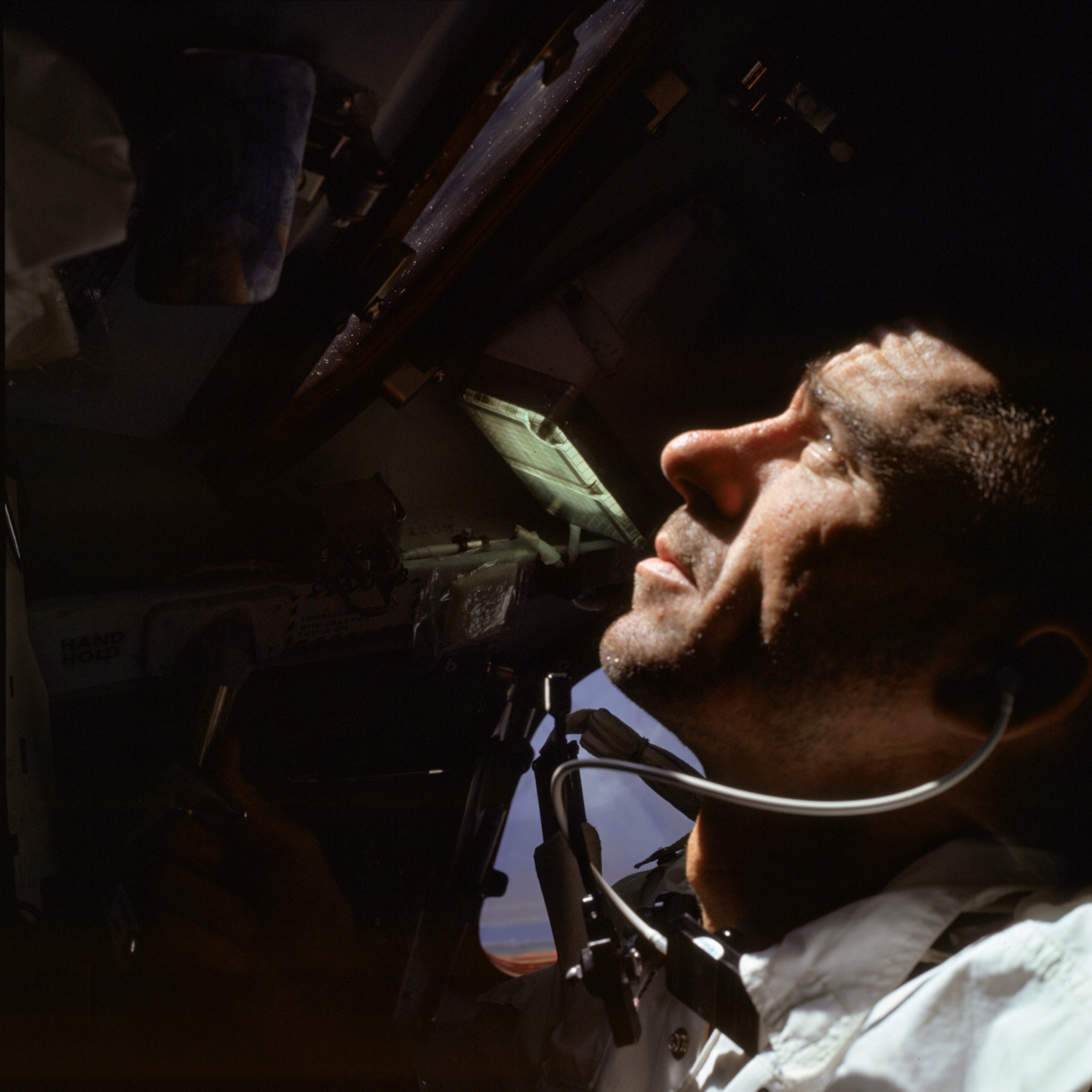
Cunningham during the mission

The first television broadcast took place on October 14. It began with a view of a card reading "From the Lovely Apollo Room high atop everything", recalling tag lines used by band leaders on 1930s radio broadcasts. Cunningham served as camera operator with Eisele as emcee. During the seven-minute broadcast, the crew showed off the spacecraft and gave the audience views of the southern United States. Before the close, Schirra held another sign, "Keep those cards and letters coming in folks", another old-time radio tag line that had been used recently by Dean Martin. This was the first live television broadcast from an American spacecraft (Gordon Cooper had transmitted slow-scan television pictures from Faith 7 in 1963, but the pictures were of poor quality and were never broadcast). According to Jones, "these apparently amiable astronauts delivered to NASA a solid public relations coup." Daily television broadcasts of about 10 minutes each followed, during which the crew held up more signs and educated their audience about spaceflight; after the return to Earth, they were awarded a special Emmy for the telecasts.

Later on October 14, the craft's onboard radar receiver was able to lock onto a ground-based transmitter, again showing a CSM in lunar orbit could keep contact with a LM returning from the Moon's surface. Throughout the remainder of the mission, the crew continued to run tests on the CSM, including of the propulsion, navigation, environmental, electrical and thermal control systems. All checked out well; according to authors Francis French and Colin Burgess, "The redesigned Apollo spacecraft was better than anyone had dared to hope." Eisele found that navigation was not as easy as anticipated; he found it difficult to use Earth's horizon in sighting stars due to the fuzziness of the atmosphere, and water dumps made it difficult to discern which glistening points were stars and which ice particles. By the end of the mission, the SPS engine had been fired eight times without any problems.

One difficulty that was encountered was with the sleep schedule, which called for one crew member to remain awake at all times; Eisele was to remain awake while the others slept, and sleep during part of the time the others were awake. This did not work well, as it was hard for crew members to work without making a disturbance. Cunningham later remembered waking up to find Eisele dozing.

=== Conflict and splashdown ===
Schirra was angered by NASA managers allowing the launch to proceed despite the winds, saying "The mission pushed us to the wall in terms of risk." Jones said, "This prelaunch dispute was the prelude to a tug of war over command decisions for the rest of the mission." Lack of sleep and Schirra's cold probably contributed to the conflict between the astronauts and Mission Control that surfaced from time to time during the flight.

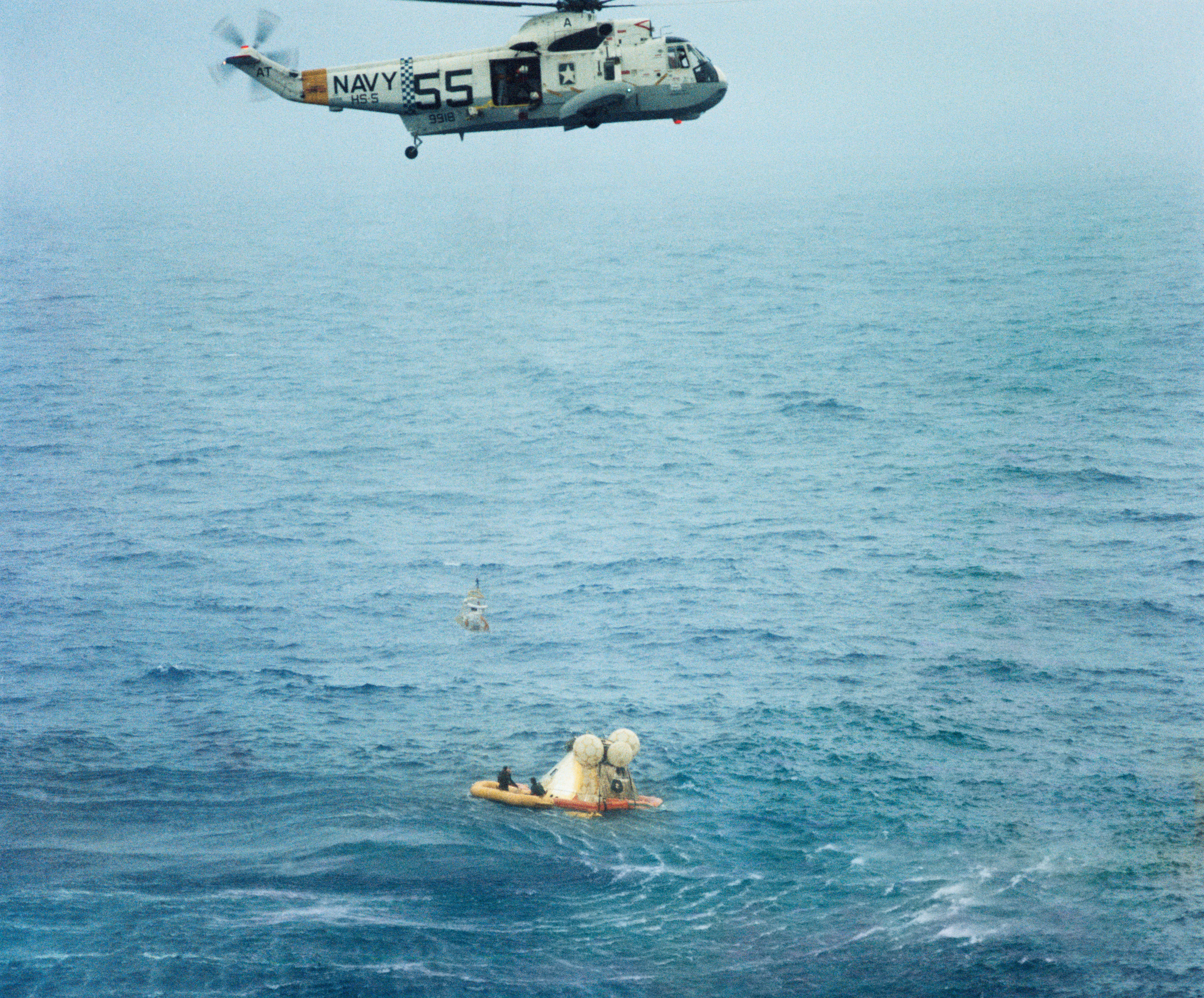
A crewmember being hoisted into the recovery SH-3 helicopter

The testing of the television resulted in a disagreement between the crew and Houston. Schirra stated at the time, "You've added two burns to this flight schedule, and you've added a urine water dump; and we have a new vehicle up here, and I can tell you at this point, TV will be delayed without any further discussion until after the rendezvous." Schirra later wrote, "we'd resist anything that interfered with our main mission objectives. On this particular Saturday morning a TV program clearly interfered." Eisele agreed in his memoirs, "We were preoccupied with preparations for that critical exercise and didn't want to divert our attention with what seemed to be trivialities at the time. ... Evidently the earth people felt differently; there was a real stink about the hotheaded, recalcitrant Apollo 7 crew who wouldn't take orders." French and Burgess wrote, "When this point is considered objectively—that in a front-loaded mission the rendezvous, alignment, and engine tests should be done before television shows—it is hard to argue with him [Schirra]." Although Slayton gave in to Schirra, the commander's attitude surprised flight controllers.

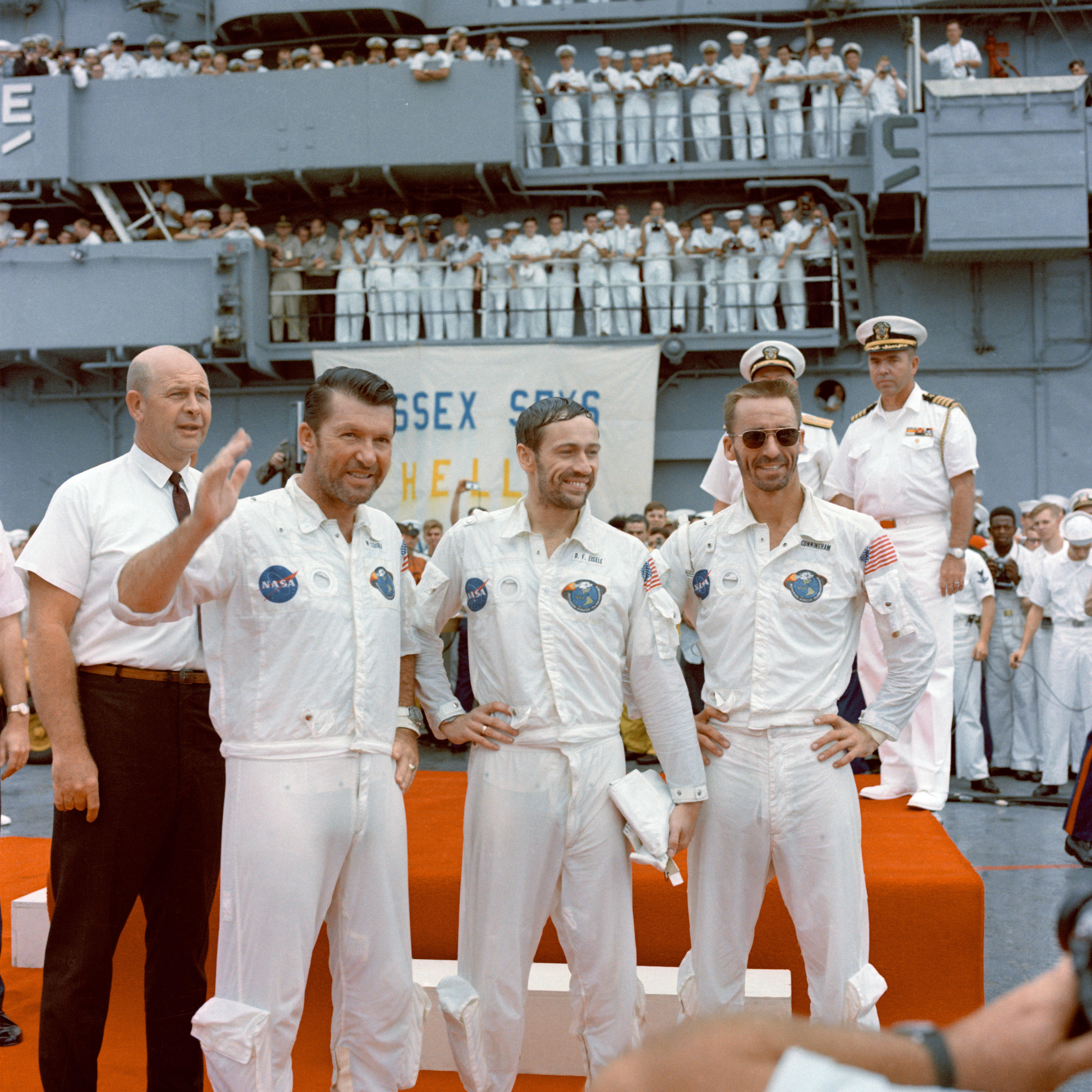
The crew is welcomed aboard USS Essex

On Day 8, after being asked to follow a new procedure passed up from the ground that caused the computer to freeze, Eisele radioed, "We didn't get the results that you were after. We didn't get a damn thing, in fact ... you bet your ass ... as far as we're concerned, somebody down there screwed up royally when he laid that one on us." Schirra later stated his belief that this was the one main occasion when Eisele upset Mission Control. The next day saw more conflict, with Schirra telling Mission Control after having to make repeated firings of the RCS to keep the spacecraft stable during a test, "I wish you would find out the idiot's name who thought up this test. I want to find out, and I want to talk to him personally when I get back down." Eisele joined in, "While you are at it, find out who dreamed up 'P22 horizon test'; that is a beauty also." (Note: "P22" refers to Program 22 of the Apollo Guidance Computer, a means of getting a navigational fix on the spacecraft. Earlier in the day Eisele had been asked to perform "P22 horizon sightings," to which he initially replied, "What in the world is a P22 horizon sighting?")

A further source of tension between Mission Control and the crew was that Schirra repeatedly expressed the view that the reentry should be conducted with their helmets off. He perceived a risk that their eardrums might burst due to the sinus pressure from their colds, and they wanted to be able to pinch their noses and blow to equalize the pressure as it increased during reentry. This would have been impossible wearing the helmets. Over several days, Schirra refused advice from the ground that the helmets should be worn, stating it was his prerogative as commander to decide this, though Slayton warned him he would have to answer for it after the flight. Schirra stated in 1994, "In this case I had a cold, and I'd had enough discussion with the ground, and I didn't have much more time to talk about whether we would put the helmet on or off. I said, essentially, I'm on board, I'm commanding. They could wear all the black armbands they wanted if I was lost or if I lost my hearing. But I had the responsibility for getting through the mission." No helmets were worn during the entry. Director of Flight Operations Christopher C. Kraft demanded an explanation for what he believed was Schirra's insubordination from the CAPCOM, Stafford. Kraft later said, "Schirra was exercising his commander’s right to have the last word, and that was that."

Apollo 7 splashed down without incident at 11:11:48 UTC on October 22, 1968, 200 nautical miles (230 mi; 370 km) SSW of Bermuda and 7 nautical miles (8 mi; 13 km) north of the recovery ship USS Essex. The mission's duration was 10 days, 20 hours, 9 minutes and 3 seconds.

== Assessment and aftermath ==
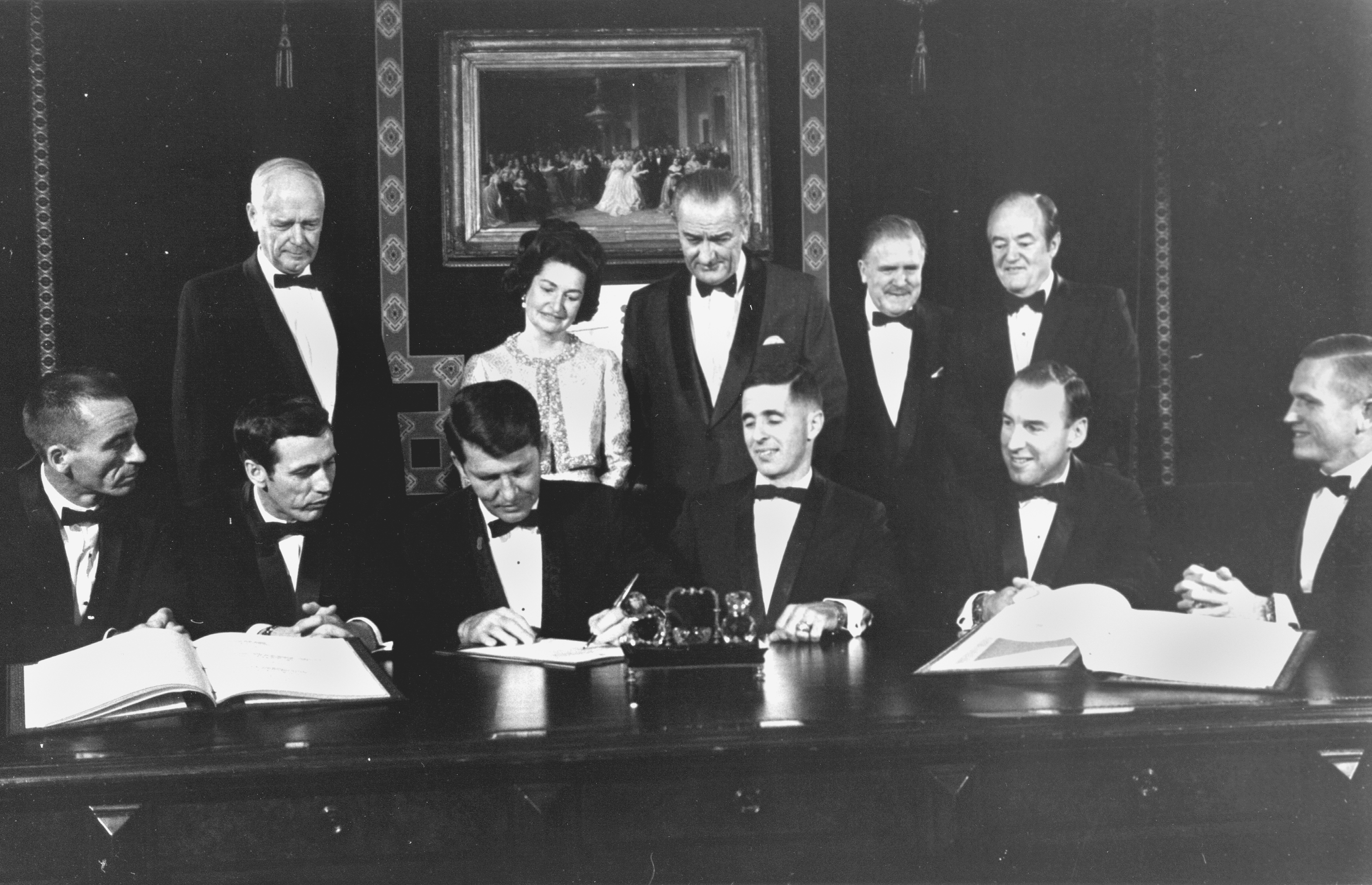
Apollo 7 and 8 astronauts at the White House with President Lyndon and First Lady Lady Bird Johnson, Vice President Humphrey, NASA Administrator James E. Webb and Charles Lindbergh

After the mission, NASA awarded Schirra, Eisele and Cunningham its Exceptional Service Medal in recognition of their success. On November 2, 1968, President Lyndon B. Johnson held a ceremony at the LBJ Ranch in Johnson City, Texas, to present the astronauts with the medals. He also presented NASA's highest honor, the Distinguished Service Medal, to recently retired NASA administrator James E. Webb, for his "outstanding leadership of America's space program" since the beginning of Apollo. Johnson also invited the crew to the White House, and they went there in December 1968.

Despite the difficulties between the crew and Mission Control, the mission successfully met its objectives to verify the Apollo command and service module's flightworthiness, allowing Apollo 8's flight to the Moon to proceed just two months later. John T. McQuiston wrote in The New York Times after Eisele's death in 1987 that Apollo 7's success brought renewed confidence to NASA's space program. According to Jones, "Three weeks after the Apollo 7 crew returned, NASA administrator Thomas Paine green-lighted Apollo 8 to launch in late December and orbit the Moon. Apollo 7 had delivered NASA from its trial by fire—it was the first small step down a path that would lead another crew, nine months later, to the Sea of Tranquility."

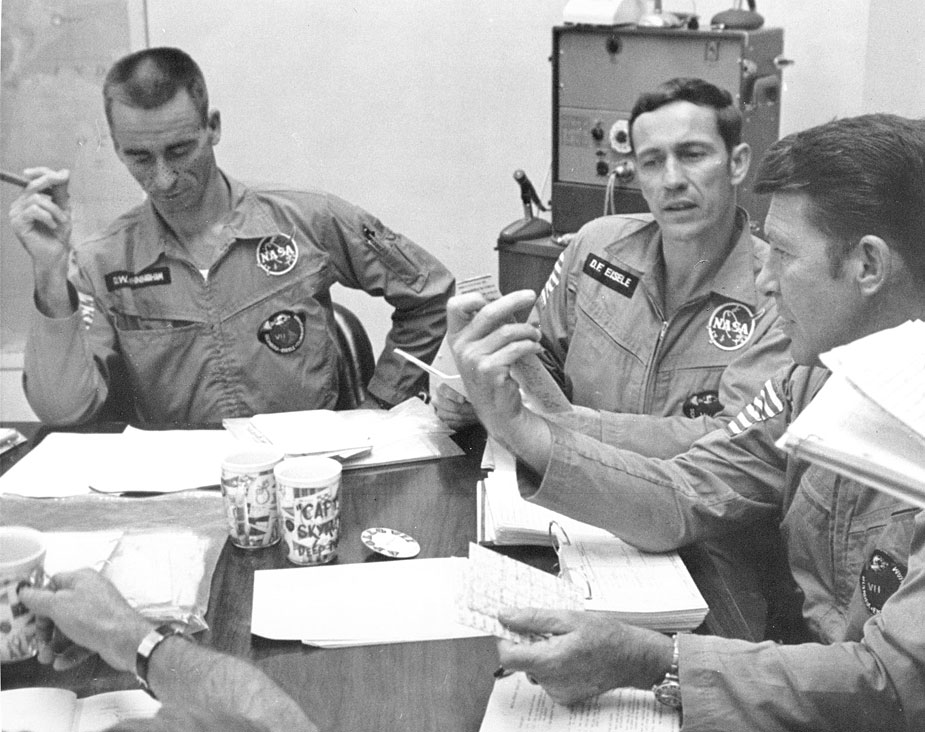
The Apollo 7 crew is debriefed, October 23, 1968

General Sam Phillips, the Apollo Program Manager, said at the time, "Apollo 7 goes into my book as a perfect mission. We accomplished 101 percent of our objectives." Kraft wrote, "Schirra and his crew did it all—or at least all of it that counted ... [T]hey proved to everyone's satisfaction that the SPS engine was one of the most reliable we'd ever sent into space. They operated the Command and Service Modules with true professionalism." Eisele wrote, "We were insolent, high-handed, and Machiavellian at times. Call it paranoia, call it smart—it got the job done. We had a great flight." Kranz stated in 1998, "we all look back now with a longer perspective. Schirra really wasn't on us as bad as it seemed at the time. ... Bottom line was, even with a grumpy commander, we got the job done as a team."

None of the Apollo 7 crew members flew in space again. According to Jim Lovell, "Apollo 7 was a very successful flight—they did an excellent job—but it was a very contentious flight. They all teed off the ground people quite considerably, and I think that kind of put a stop on future flights [for them]." Schirra had announced, before the flight, his retirement from NASA and the Navy, effective July 1, 1969. The other two crew members had their spaceflight careers stunted by their involvement in Apollo 7; by some accounts, Kraft told Slayton he was unwilling to work in future with any member of the crew. Cunningham heard the rumors that Kraft had said this and confronted him in early 1969; Kraft denied making the statement "but his reaction wasn't exactly outraged innocence." Eisele's career may also have been affected by becoming the first active astronaut to divorce, followed by a quick remarriage, and an indifferent performance as backup CMP for Apollo 10. He resigned from the Astronaut Office in 1970 though he remained with NASA at the Langley Research Center in Virginia until 1972, when he was eligible for retirement. Cunningham was made the leader of the Astronaut Office's Skylab division. He related that he was informally offered command of the first Skylab crew, but when this instead went to Apollo 12 commander Pete Conrad, with Cunningham offered the position of backup commander, he resigned as an astronaut in 1971.

Schirra, Eisele and Cunningham were the only crew, of all the Apollo, Skylab and Apollo–Soyuz missions, who had not been awarded the Distinguished Service Medal immediately following their missions (though Schirra had received the medal twice before, for his Mercury and Gemini missions). Therefore, NASA administrator Michael D. Griffin decided to belatedly award the medals to the crew in October 2008, "[f]or exemplary performance in meeting all the Apollo 7 mission objectives and more on the first crewed Apollo mission, paving the way for the first flight to the Moon on Apollo 8 and the first crewed lunar landing on Apollo 11." Only Cunningham was still alive at the time as Eisele had died in 1987 and Schirra in 2007. Eisele's widow accepted his medal, and Apollo 8 crew member Bill Anders accepted Schirra's. Other Apollo astronauts, including Neil Armstrong, Buzz Aldrin, and Alan Bean, were present at the award ceremony. Kraft, who had been in conflict with the crew during the mission, sent a conciliatory video message of congratulations, saying to Cunningham: "We gave you a hard time once but you certainly survived that and have done extremely well since ... I am frankly, very proud to call you a friend."

== Mission insignia ==
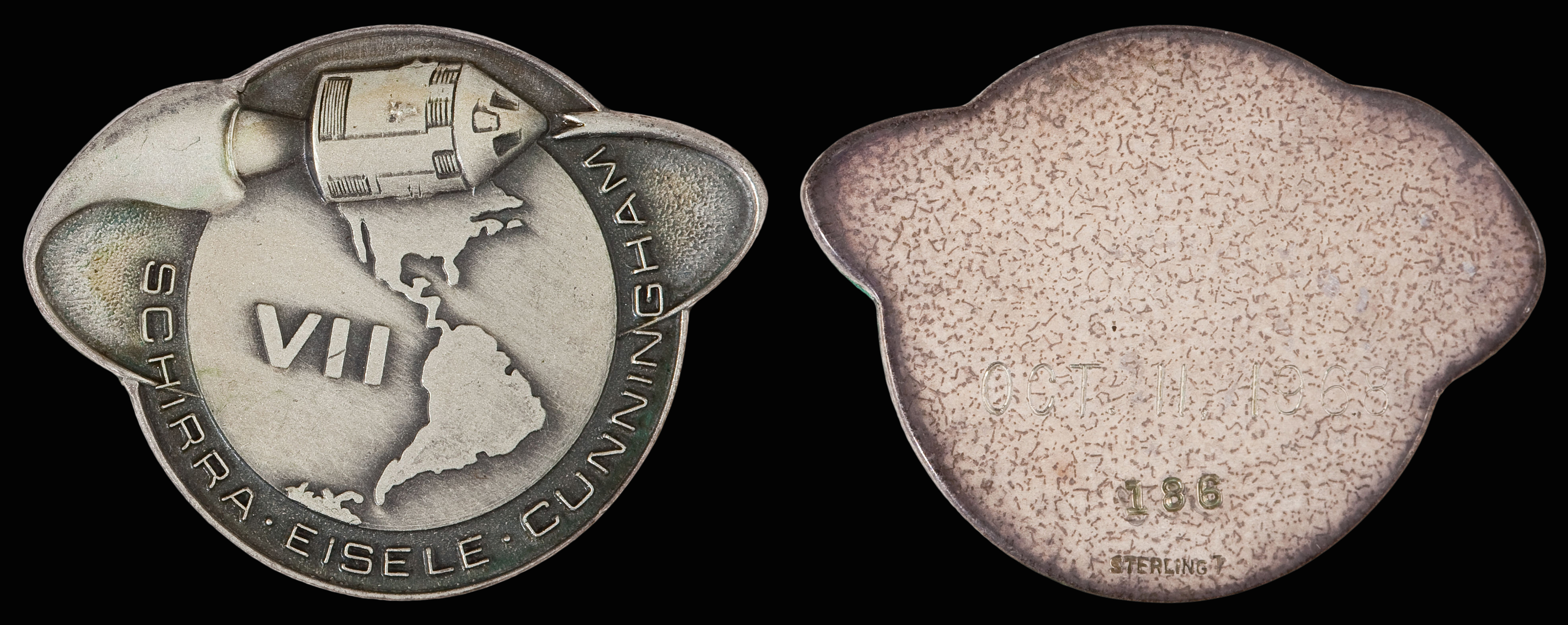
Apollo 7 flown Robbins medallion

The insignia for the flight shows a command and service module with its SPS engine firing, the trail from that fire encircling a globe and extending past the edges of the patch symbolizing the Earth-orbital nature of the mission. The Roman numeral VII appears in the South Pacific Ocean and the crew's names appear on a wide black arc at the bottom. The patch was designed by Allen Stevens of Rockwell International.

== Spacecraft location ==
In January 1969, the Apollo 7 command module was displayed on the NASA float in the inauguration parade of President Richard M. Nixon. The Apollo 7 astronauts rode in an open car. After being transferred to the Smithsonian Institution in 1970, the spacecraft was loaned to the National Museum of Science and Technology, in Ottawa, Ontario. It was returned to the United States in 2004. Currently, the Apollo 7 CM is on loan to the Frontiers of Flight Museum at Love Field in Dallas, Texas.

== Depiction in media ==
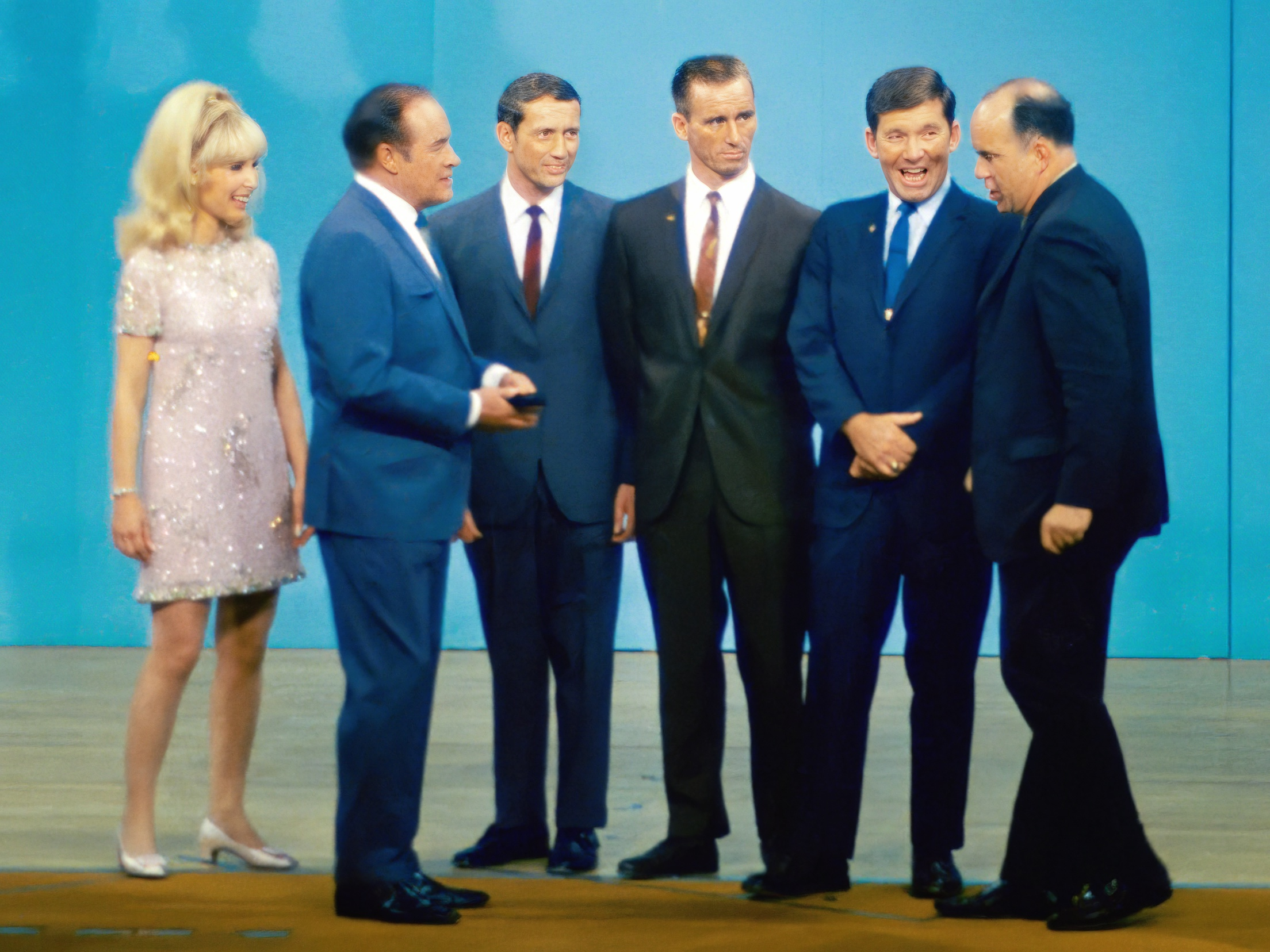
Barbara Eden, Bob Hope, Eisele, Cunningham, Schirra, and "voice of Mission Control" Paul Haney, on The Bob Hope Show.

On November 6, 1968, comedian Bob Hope broadcast one of his variety television specials from NASA's Manned Spacecraft Center in Houston to honor the Apollo 7 crew. Barbara Eden, star of the popular comedy series I Dream of Jeannie, which featured fictional astronauts among its regular characters, appeared with Schirra, Eisele and Cunningham.

Schirra parlayed the head cold he contracted during Apollo 7 into a television advertising contract as a spokesman for Actifed, an over-the-counter version of the medicine he took in space.

The Apollo 7 mission is dramatized in the 1998 miniseries From the Earth to the Moon episode "We Have Cleared the Tower", with Mark Harmon as Schirra, John Mese as Eisele, Fredric Lehne as Cunningham and Nick Searcy as Slayton.

== Gallery ==
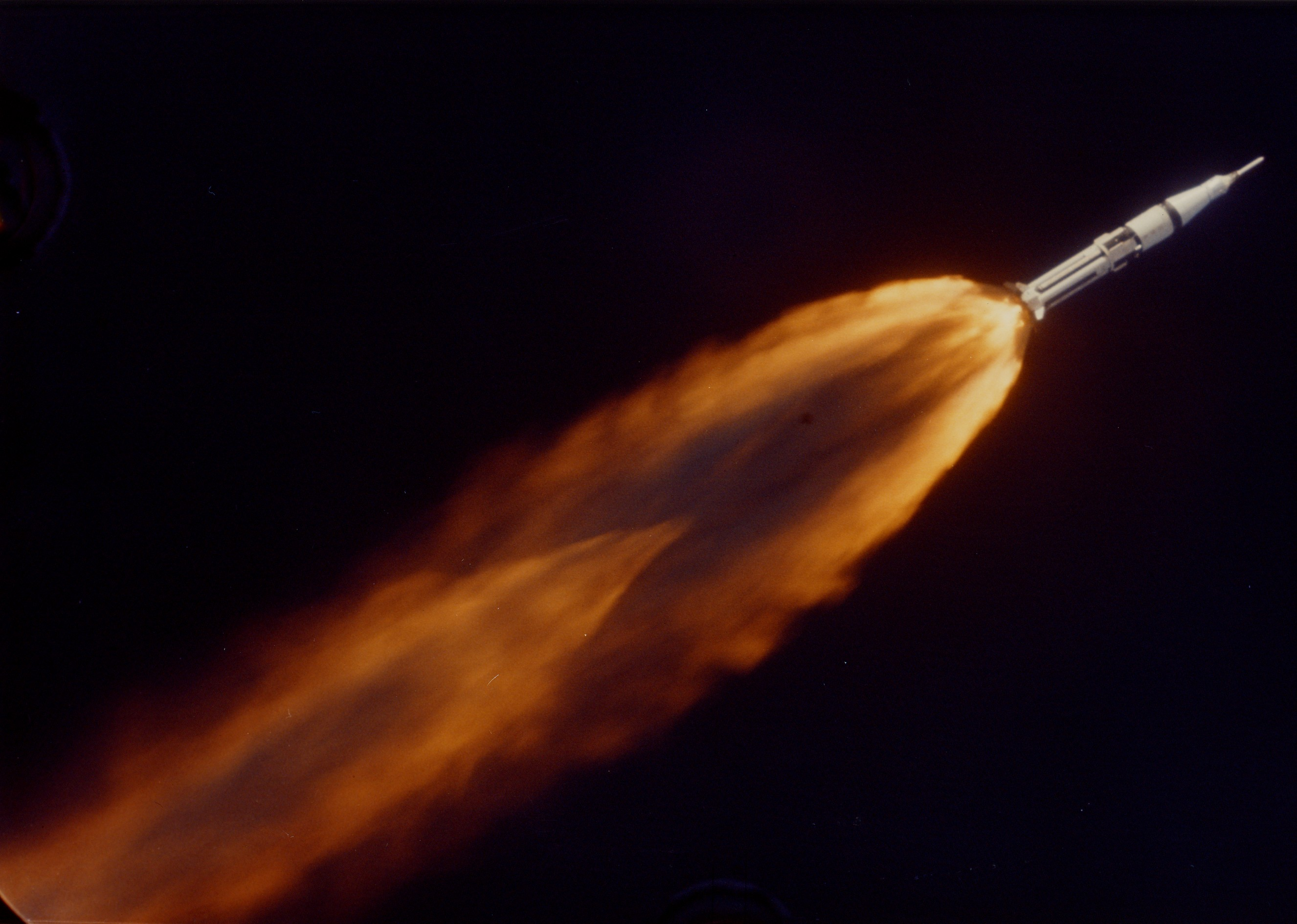
Apollo 7 in flight

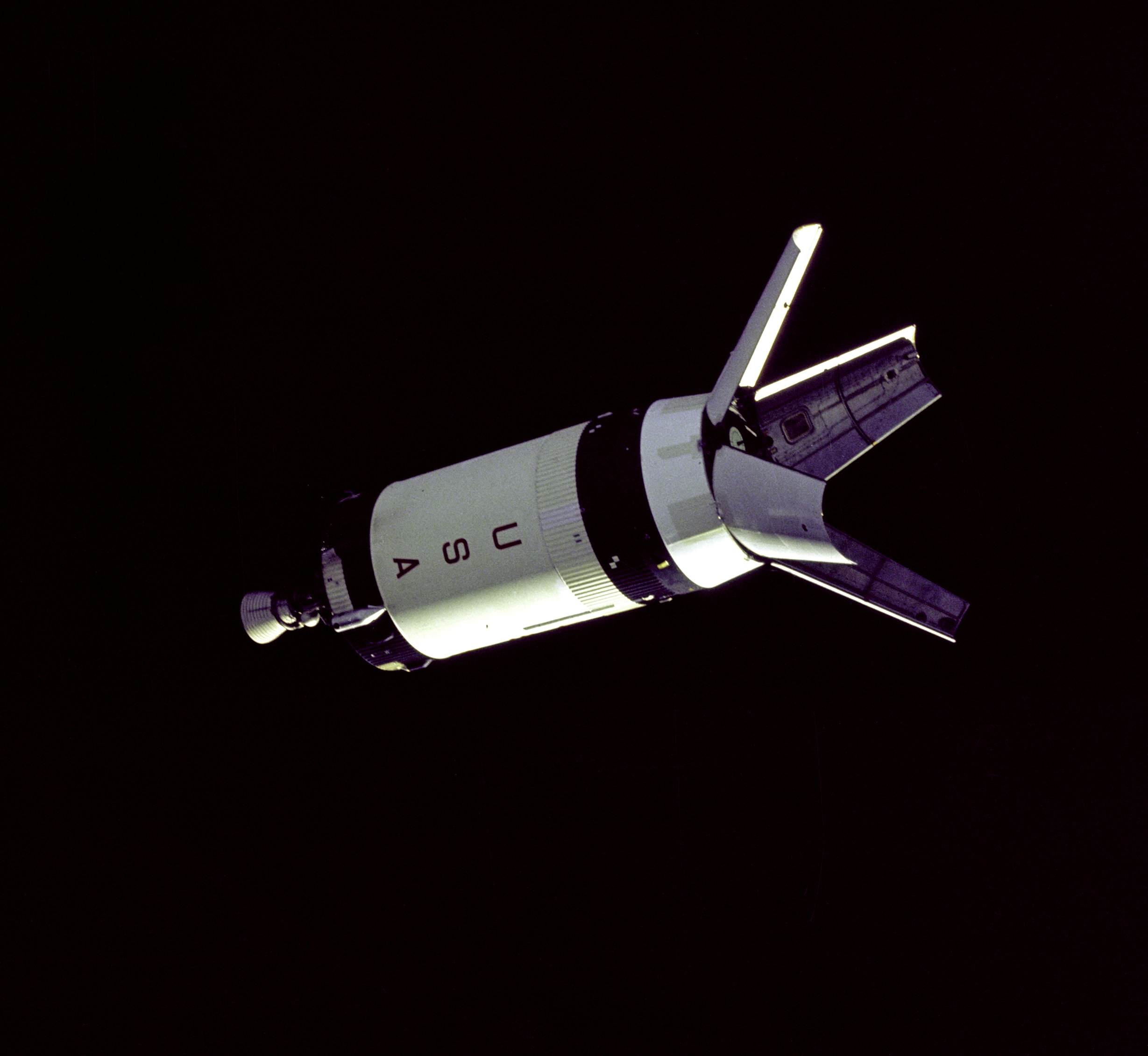
Distant view of the S-IVB stage

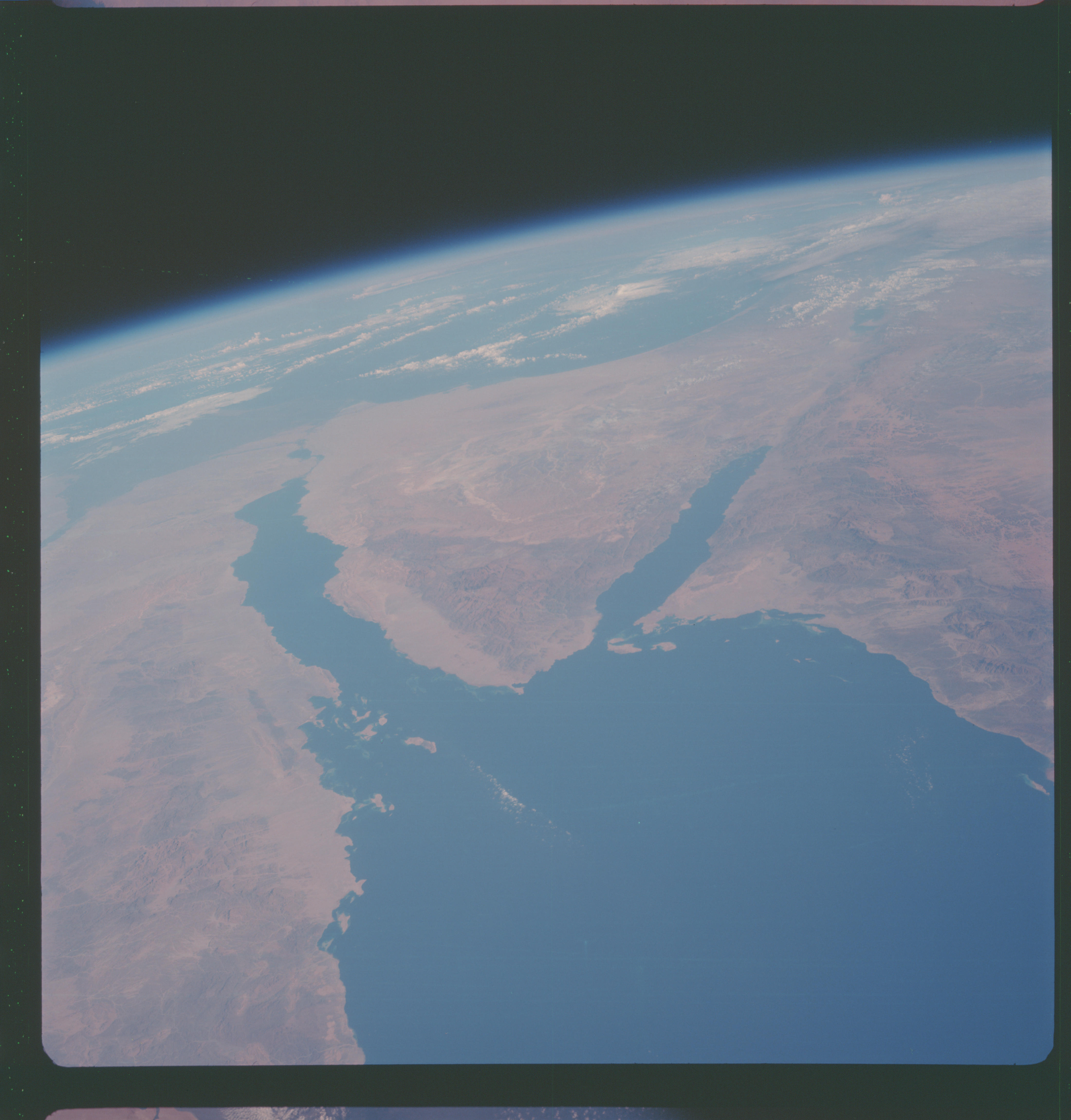
View of the Sinai Peninsula from Apollo 7

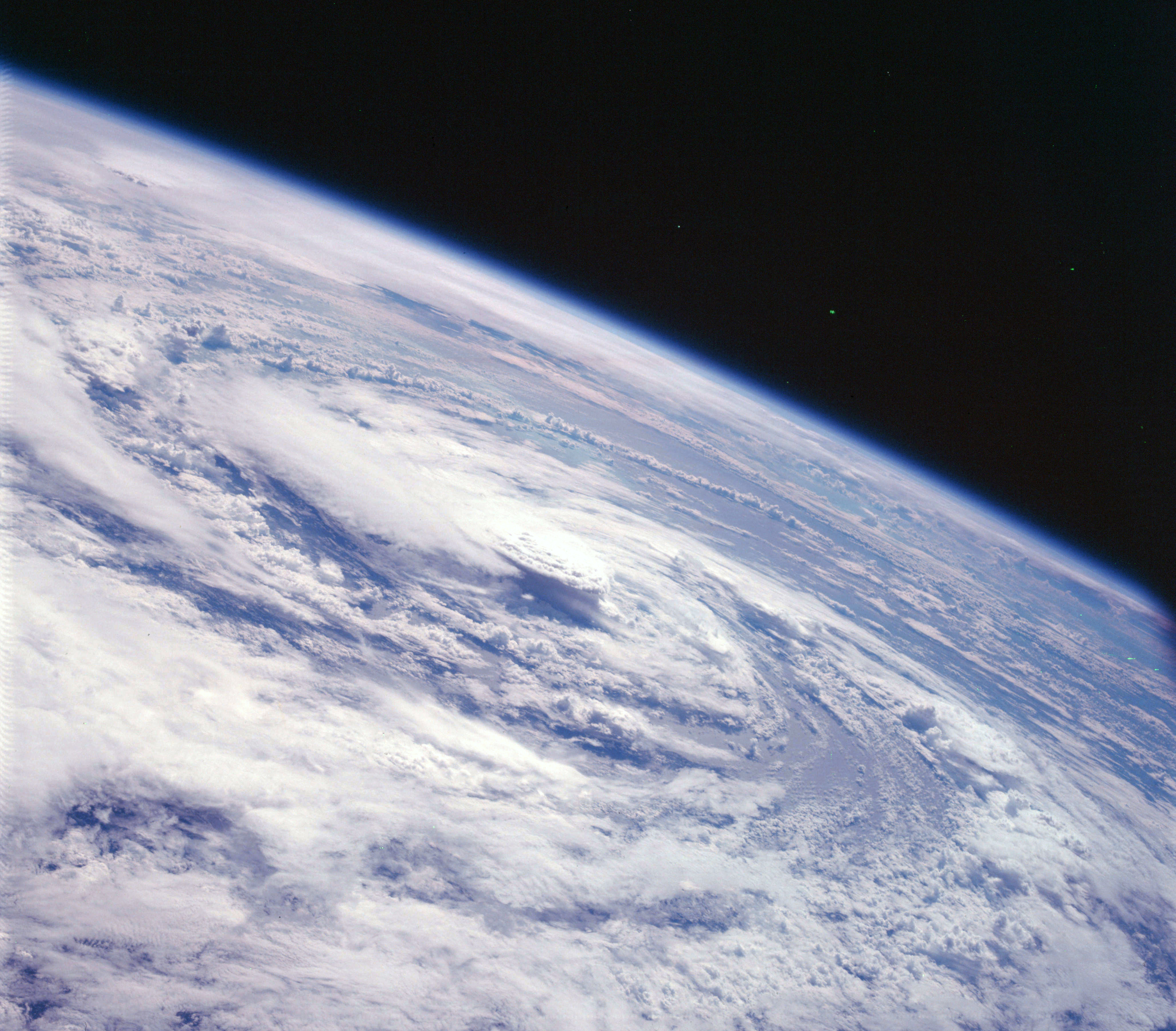
Hurricane Gladys seen from Apollo 7 on October 17, 1968

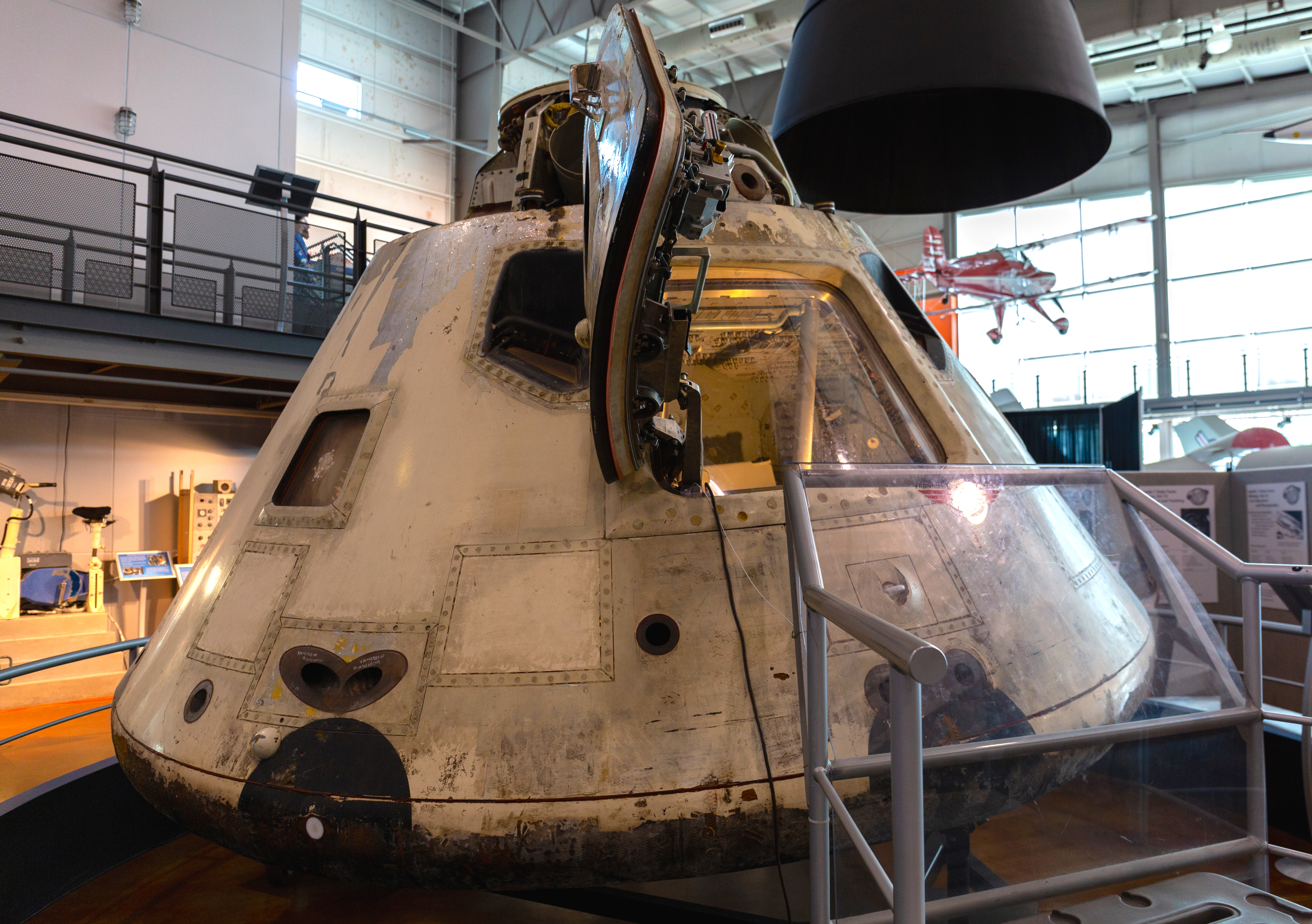
The Apollo 7 command module on display

== See also ==
- List of Apollo missions
- Timeline of longest spaceflights

== Bibliography ==
- Apollo 7 Mission Report (PDF). Houston, Texas: NASA. 1968. Archived (PDF) from the original on October 9, 2022.
- Apollo 7 Press Kit (PDF). Washington, D.C.: NASA. 1968. 68-168K. Archived (PDF) from the original on October 9, 2022.
- Burgess, Colin; Doolan, Kate (2003). Fallen Astronauts: Heroes Who Died Reaching for the Moon. University of Nebraska Press. ISBN 978-0-8032-6212-6.
- Chaikin, Andrew (1995) [1994]. A Man on the Moon: The Voyages of the Apollo Astronauts. Penguin Books. ISBN 978-0-14-024146-4.
- Cunningham, Walter (2003) [1977]. The All-American Boys (updated ed.). ibooks, inc. ISBN 978-1-59176-605-6.
- Eisele, Donn (2017). Apollo Pilot: The Memoir of Astronaut Donn Eisele. University of Nebraska Press. ISBN 978-0-8032-6283-6.
- Farmer, Gene; Hamblin, Dora Jane; Armstrong, Neil; Collins, Michael; Aldrin, Edwin E. Jr. (1970). First on the Moon: A Voyage with Neil Armstrong, Michael Collins, Edwin E. Aldrin Jr. Epilogue by Arthur C. Clarke (1st ed.). Little, Brown and Company. ISBN 978-0-7181-0736-9. LCCN 76103950. OCLC 71625.
- French, Francis; Burgess, Colin (2007). In the Shadow of the Moon : a Challenging Journey to Tranquility, 1965-1969 (eBook ed.). University of Nebraska Press. ISBN 978-0-8032-1128-5.
- Orloff, Richard W.; Harland, David M. (2006). Apollo: The Definitive Sourcebook. Springer Science+Business Media. ISBN 978-0-387-30043-6.
- Schirra, Wally; Billings, Richard N. (1988). Schirra's Space. Bluejacket Books. Naval Institute Press. ISBN 978-1-55750-792-1.
- Scott, David; Leonov, Alexei (2006). Two Sides of the Moon: Our Story of the Cold War Space Race. with Christine Toomey (eBook ed.). St. Martin's Griffin. ISBN 978-0-312-30866-7.
- Shepard, Alan B.; Slayton, Donald K.; Barbree, Jay; Benedict, Howard (1994). Moon Shot: The Inside Story of America's Race to the Moon. Turner Publishing Company. ISBN 978-1-878685-54-4. LCCN 94003027. OCLC 29846731.
- Stafford, Thomas; Cassutt, Michael (2002). We Have Capture (eBook ed.). Washington, DC: Smithsonian Institution Press. pp. 552–55. ISBN 978-1-58834-070-2.
- Steven-Boniecki, Dwight (2010). Live TV From the Moon. Apogee Books. ISBN 978-1-926592-16-9. OCLC 489010199.
