= Alexander Kratz Rupp =

US Air Force officer (1930–1965)

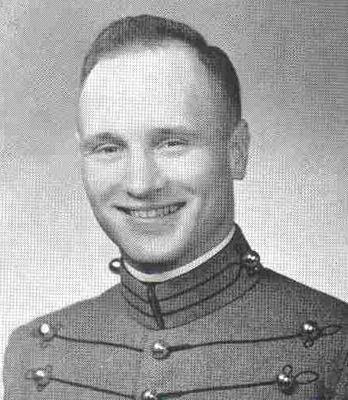
- Rupp as a cadet at the U.S. Military Academy
- Born: 2 July 1930; Bellefonte, Pennsylvania, U.S.
- Died: 11 June 1965 (aged 34); Buford, Ohio, U.S.
- Burial place: Arlington National Cemetery, U.S.
- Military career
- Allegiance: United States
- Branch: United States Air Force
- Service years: 1955–1965
- Rank: Major

Alexander Kratz Rupp (2 July 1930 – 11 June 1965) was a United States Air Force major. He graduated from the United States Military Academy at West Point, New York, in 1955. While at West Point he kidnapped Bill the Goat, the United States Naval Academy mascot, before the 1953 Army–Navy Game. He was one of 34 finalists for NASA Astronaut Group 3 selection in 1963, but was unsuccessful. He was killed in an air crash on 11 June 1965.

== Biography ==
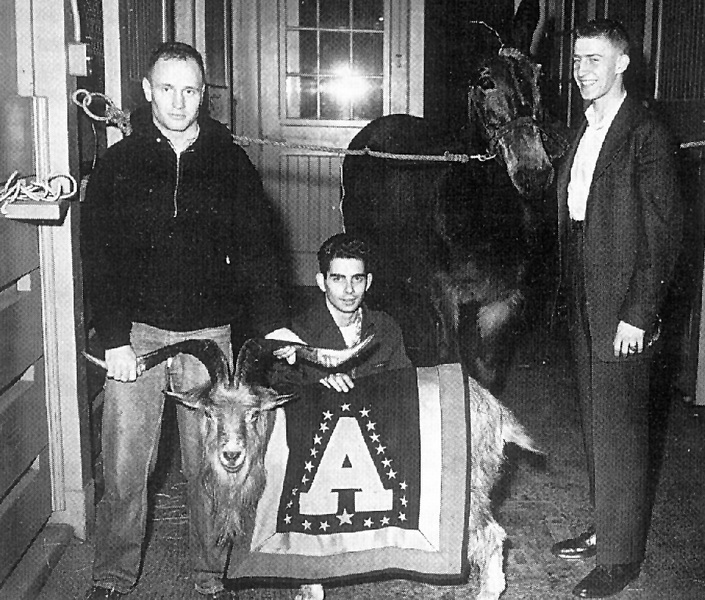
Rupp (left) and Ben Schemmer (right) with Billy XII after the 1953 kidnapping

Alexander Kratz Rupp was born in Bellefonte, Pennsylvania, on 2 July 1930, the son of Charles A. Rupp and his wife Luella née Kratz. He had two sisters, Susan and Milicent; a twin brother drowned in early childhood. He grew up in State College, Pennsylvania, where his father taught mathematics at Penn State University. He played cornet in the local drum and bugle corps, which won a national championship. When the United States entered World War II, his father was commissioned as a captain in the United States Army Signal Corps and was posted to Washington, D.C. Soon after, the family moved there to join him. Rapp attended Central High School there, and commanded the school cadet corps in his final year. On graduation, the U.S. Navy awarded him a Holloway Plan scholarship to study at Harvard University.

After two years at Harvard, Rupp decided that his prospects as a United States Navy Reserve officer were poor, so he dropped out and took a job driving a bulldozer, and later a power shovel. He attended National Guard drills and summer camp. On 3 July 1951, he entered the United States Military Academy at West Point, New York, having secured a National Guard appointment. He participated in cross-country running and was a cheerleader for three years, for which he earned a varsity letter "A". While at West Point, Rupp and fellow cheerleaders kidnapped Bill the Goat, the United States Naval Academy mascot, before the 1953 Army–Navy Game. Rupp graduated 63rd in the class of 1955, and chose to join the United States Air Force (USAF). He underwent flight training in Texas and Mississippi, and on his own time worked on aircraft and automotive engines in the base shops.

Rupp was assigned to the 53rd Fighter Squadron, 36th Day Fighter Wing, based at Bitburg Air Base in Germany. He learned to speak fluent German, and was often chosen to address the crowds that flocked to see air shows at the base. He courted and married a German girl, Ruth Michels. They had two children, a son, Alexander Michael Rupp, and a daughter, Karen. The couple skied in Switzerland and climbed the Finsteraarhorn.

The Air Force wanted to send Rupp to the University of Mainz and then have him teach German at the United States Air Force Academy, but Rupp wanted to become an astronaut. Instead, he went to Wright-Patterson Air Force Base in Ohio, where he earned a master's degree in astronautics in 1962. On 30 March 1963, he then went to Edwards Air Force Base in California, as one of fourteen USAF captains in Class IV of the Aerospace Research Pilot School (ARPS), graduating on 20 December 1963. He was one of 34 finalists for NASA Astronaut Group 3 selection in 1963, but was passed over. Two of his ARPS IV classmates, Theodore Freeman and David Scott, were selected, and a third, James Irwin, was selected in 1966. In 1972, along with Alfred Worden, who had been Rupp's head cheerleader at West Point, Scott and Irwin flew to the Moon on Apollo 15.

Promoted to major, Rupp returned to Wright-Patterson, where he worked in the test mission program of the Aeronautical Systems Division. He was chosen to attend the Joint Forces Staff College in Norfolk, Virginia, in August 1965, but was killed in an air accident while piloting a Convair F-102 Delta Dagger in the vicinity of Buford, Ohio, on 11 June 1965. He was buried in Arlington National Cemetery. His son, Captain Alexander Michael Rupp, followed his father in the Air Force, and was killed while attempting an emergency landing in his General Dynamics F-16 Fighting Falcon at Creech Air Force Base after a mid-air collision with another F-16.
