= John Yamnicky =

US Air Navy officer (1930–2001)

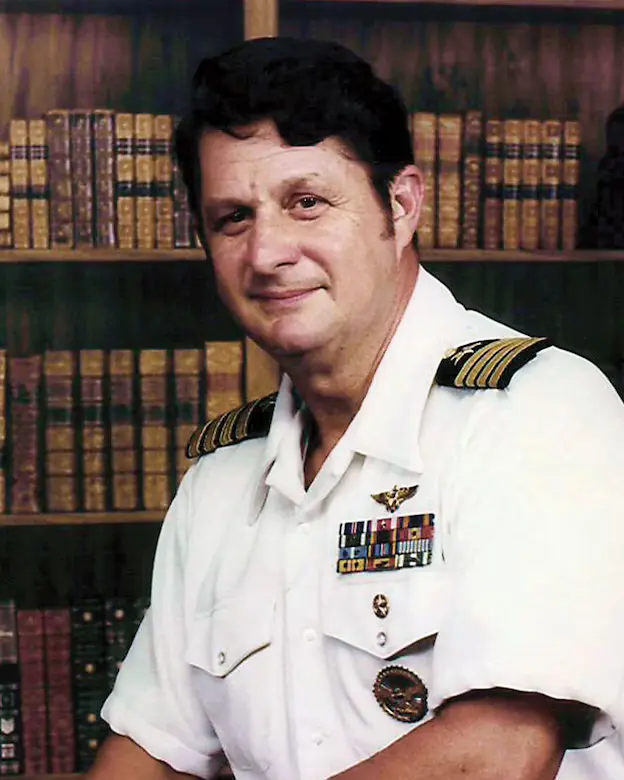
- Born: 8 June 1930; Barren Run, Pennsylvania, U.S.
- Died: 11 September 2001 (aged 71); The Pentagon, Arlington County, Virginia, U.S.
- Cause of death: Terrorist attack
- Burial place: Arlington National Cemetery
- Military career
- Allegiance: United States
- Branch: United States Navy
- Service years: 1952–1979
- Rank: Captain
- Commands: United States Naval Test Pilot School; Attack Squadron 172
- Conflicts: Korean War; Vietnam War
- Awards: Distinguished Flying Cross; Air Medal (11); Meritorious Service Medal (2)

John David Yamnicky Sr. (8 June 1930 – 11 September 2001) was a United States Navy captain, naval aviator and test pilot. He graduated from the United States Naval Academy at Annapolis, Maryland, in 1952. While at Annapolis he played in the 1950 Army–Navy Game. He was one of 34 finalists for NASA Astronaut Group 3 selection in 1963, but was unsuccessful. He served in the Korean War and on two combat tours in the Vietnam War. He was killed in the terrorist attack on The Pentagon on 11 September 2001, on which American Airlines Flight 77, a hijacked aircraft crashed into The Pentagon that was flown by lead hijacker, Hani Hanjour.

== Early life ==
John David Yamnicky Sr. was born in Barren Run, Pennsylvania, on 8 June 1930, the son of John Joseph Yamnicky, a coal miner, and his wife Mary. He had an older sister, Mary. His father became ill with a lung disease, and took a job in a candy factory. This prompted the family to move to McKeesport, Pennsylvania, where Yamnicky attended McKeesport Area High School. He took "David" as his middle name, adopting the middle name of his friend George D. Miller. In 1944, Yamnicky was part of the track and field athletics team, participating in the 220-yard (200 m) and 440-yard (400 m) events, and set records as a member of the 880-yard (800 m) relay team. He also played basketball. In his senior year, he was a wide receiver on the school American football team, the McKeesport Tigers, who won the state championship and went on to play (and lose to) Miami in Scholastic Orange Bowl on Christmas Day 1947 before a crowd of 25,000.

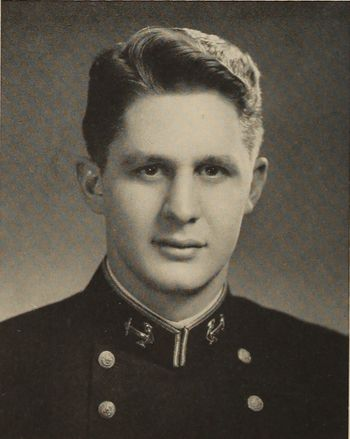
Yamnicky as midshipman at the United States Naval Academy (1952)

In 1948, Yamnicky graduated from high school and sat the entrance examinations for the United States Naval Academy at Annapolis, Maryland, having been nominated by Pennsylvania congressman Frank Buchanan. He passed and was admitted to the class of 1952. While at Anapolis, he played on the football team as a lineman and was part of the Navy Midshipmen football team that defeated the Army Black Knights football team in the 1950 Army–Navy Game.

== Navy career ==
On graduation from Annapolis on 8 June 1952, Yamnicky was commissioned as an ensign and assigned to the attack transport USS Calvert as a gunnery officer. The ship ferried troops between the West Coast and Korea in support of the Korean War. In September 1953, he was sent to flight school at Naval Air Station Pensacola in Florida. He completed his aviation training and qualified as a naval aviator on 26 January 1955. He was then assigned to Utility Squadron 10 (VU-10). Based at Naval Air Station Guantanamo Bay in Cuba, the squadron performed several roles, including towing anti-aircraft targets, delivering supplies and carrying out air searches and rescues.

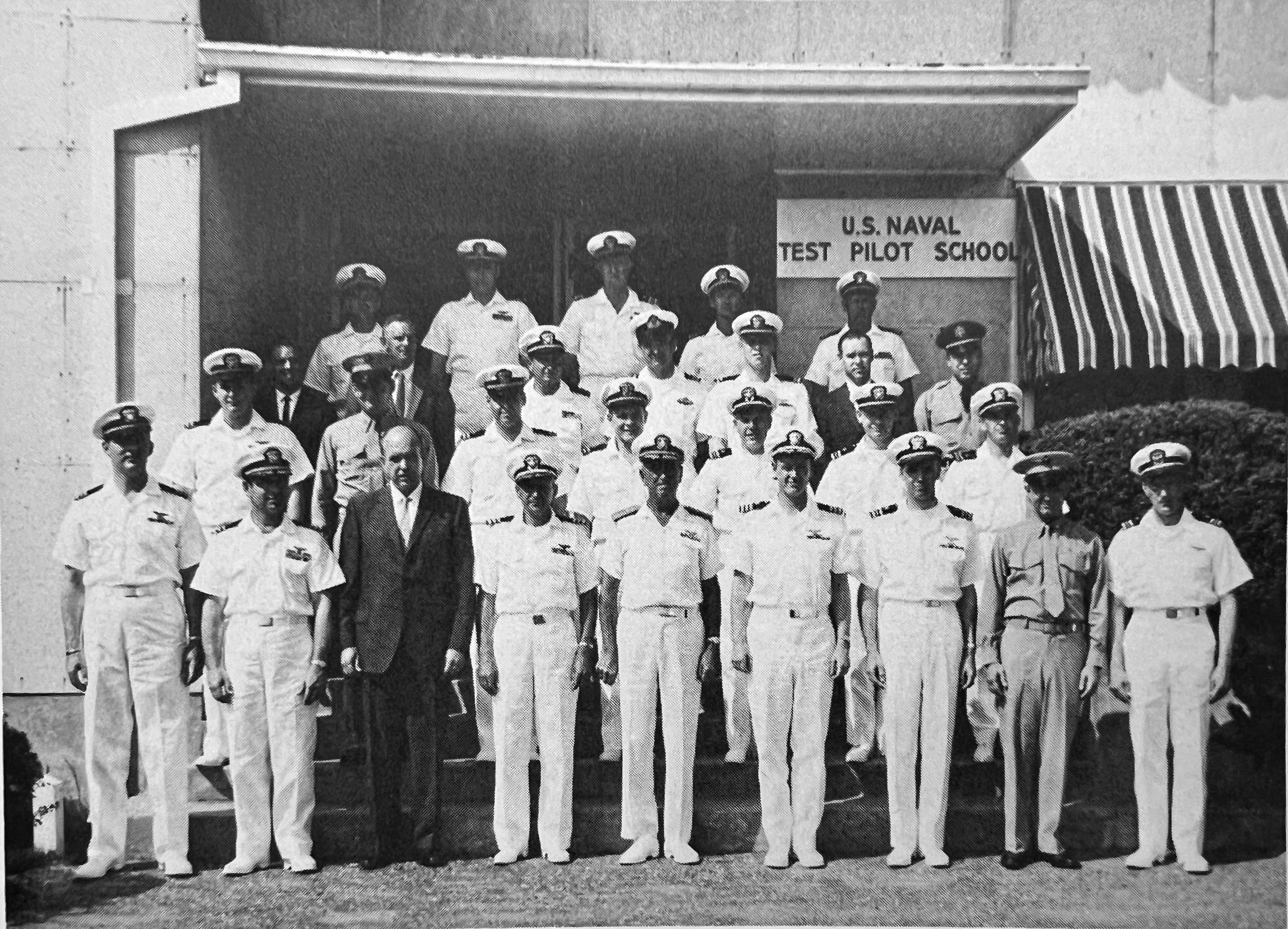
Patuxent River Class 28 (1960). Yamnicky is in the second row from the front, at left. The marine next to him is Clifton Williams

Yamnicky's next assignment was as administration and maintenance officer of Attack Squadron 46, a Grumman F9F Panther squadron based at Naval Air Station Cecil Field in Florida. The squadron re-equipped with the Douglas A-4 Skyhawk in 1958 and served on the aircraft carriers USS Franklin D. Roosevelt and Intrepid. In December 1959 he became an instructor pilot with Attack Squadron 44 (VA-44), at Naval Air Station Jacksonville in Florida, which was in the process of transitioning from the Douglas A-1 Skyraider to the Douglas A-4 Skyhawk. While there he met Janet Wilson, a nurse at the Jacksonville Naval Hospital. They were married on 23 December 1959, and had four children: John David Jr., Lorraine Elise, Mark Stirling and Jennifer Lynn.

In September 1960, Yamnicky was selected for test pilot training at the United States Naval Test Pilot School at Naval Air Station Patuxent River in Maryland. His class of sixteen included Clifton Williams, with whom he became friends, and who later became an astronaut. After graduation, Yamnicky remained at the Naval Air Test Center as a flight test project officer in the Carrier Suitability Branch. During one flight test one of his engines cut out. Then, as he headed back, the other one cut out too. Despite being advised to eject, he managed to land the aircraft, although the landing gear collapsed. He was a finalist for astronaut selection with NASA Astronaut Group 3 in November 1963, but was not selected.

After refresher training on the A-4 Skyhawk with Attack Squadron 125 (VA-125) at Naval Air Station Lemoore in California, Yamnicky joined Attack Squadron 146 (VA-146) aboard the aircraft carrier USS Constellation. He flew reconnaissance and attack missions over North Vietnam, South Vietnam and Laos. The tour ended in February 1965, and in December he returned to the Western Pacific for a second combat tour on the aircraft carrier USS Ranger. For his service in Vietnam, he was awarded the Distinguished Flying Cross, eleven Air Medals and the Navy Commendation Medal.

In August 1966, Yamnicky entered the Naval War College in Newport, Rhode Island. While there, he concurrently studied for a master's degree in international relations at George Washington University in Washington, D.C. He graduated from both, and in July 1967, after brief refresher training in the A-4 Skyhawk with Attack Squadron 44 (VA-44) at Naval Air Station Cecil Field in Florida, Yamnicky joined Attack Squadron 172 (VA-172) on a tour of duty in the Mediterranean aboard the aircraft carrier USS Franklin D. Roosevelt as its executive officer. He became the squadron's commanding officer in November 1968, and led it on a second tour of duty in the Mediterranean, this time on the aircraft carrier USS Shangri-La.

Promoted to captain, Yamnicky returned to Naval Air Station Patuxent River, where he was on the staff of the commander, Naval Air Technical Center, Rear Admiral Roy Isaman. Isaman appointed Yamnicky the director of the Test Pilot School the day after the director, Captain James L. Gammil, was killed in the crash of a Schweizer X-26 Frigate glider on 18 May 1972. Yamnicky's tenure was brief; he was succeeded by Captain Carl Birdwell Jr, on 27 September. His final assignment was in the Pentagon, where he worked in the office of the Assistant Secretary of Defense for Installations and Logistics, Frank Shrontz. Although Shrontz recommended that Yamnicky be promoted to flag rank, this did not occur, and, having reached mandatory retirement age, he retired from the Navy on 30 June 1979.

== Later life ==
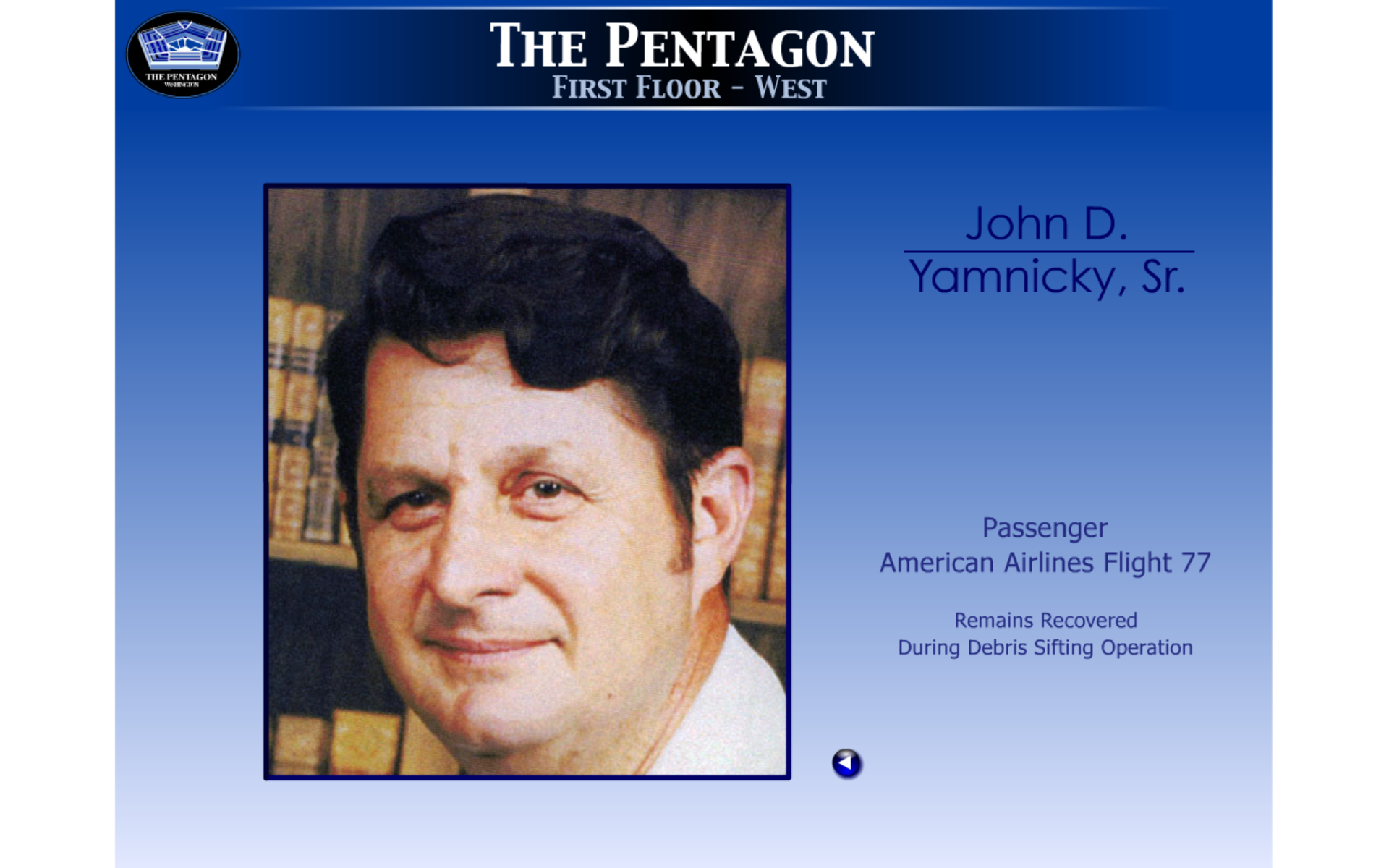
Information about the recovery of Yamnicky's remains

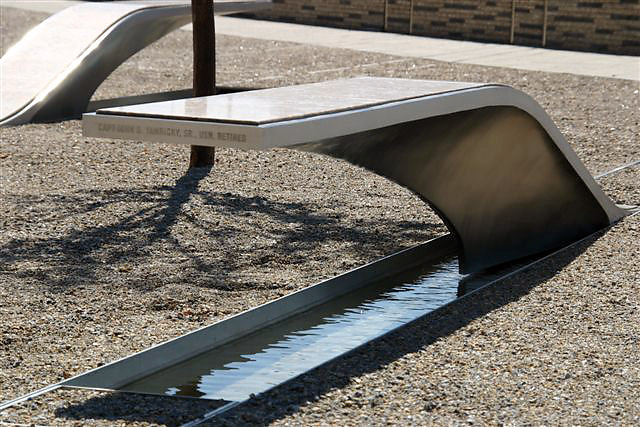
John Yamnicky memorial

Three days after retiring from the Navy, Yamnicky joined VEDA (later named Veridan), a military contractor based in Virginia, where he worked on major weapons systems such as the Grumman F-14 Tomcat and McDonnell Douglas F/A-18 Hornet fighters and the AIM-54 Phoenix and AIM-9 Sidewinder air-to-air missiles. He and his wife bought a 10-acre (4.0 ha) horse farm in Waldorf, Maryland in the mid-1970s, and he spent a lot of his time there. A rare eye disease caused him to wear a patch over the left eye.

On 11 September 2001, Yamnicky boarded American Airlines Flight 77 to Los Angeles. He was headed to Naval Air Weapons Station China Lake to work on a missile program. He was the oldest person on the aircraft. He and all aboard were killed when terrorists crashed the plane into the Pentagon. He was buried in Arlington National Cemetery, where his name is also inscribed on the Victims of Terrorist Attack on the Pentagon Memorial. There is also a memorial at the Pentagon. "He crash-landed five times and walked away from them each," a family recalled. "But not this last one."

== Awards and decorations ==
His awards include:

Naval Aviator Badge
Distinguished Flying Cross
Meritorious Service Medal w/ 5/16" gold star	Air Medal w/ strike/flight numeral 11	Navy and Marine Commendation Medal w/ "V" device
Navy Unit Commendation w/ 3/16" bronze star	National Defense Service Medal w/ 3/16" bronze star	Korean Service Medal w/ two 3/16" bronze stars
Armed Forces Expeditionary Medal	Vietnam Service Medal w/ two 3/16" bronze stars	Republic of Vietnam Gallantry Cross Unit Citation
United Nations Korea Medal	Vietnam Campaign Medal	Republic of Korea War Service Medal
