= Space Shot =

Space Shot or space shot may refer to:

- Space shot (ride), a variation of the drop tower amusement ride
- Space launch, launches into space
- Space Shot (G.I. Joe), a fictional character in the G.I. Joe universe
- Spaceshot (Transformers), a Transformers character
- Shooter: Space Shot, a video game
- Space Shots (trading cards), series of space-themed trading cards
