= Fotomuseum Antwerp =

Coordinates: 51°12′33″N 4°23′15″E

Fotomuseum Antwerp, also known as FOMU, is a museum of photography in Antwerp, Belgium.

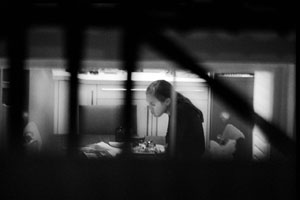
An example from Interiors Series by Henry Bond exhibited at the Fotomuseum in 2005.

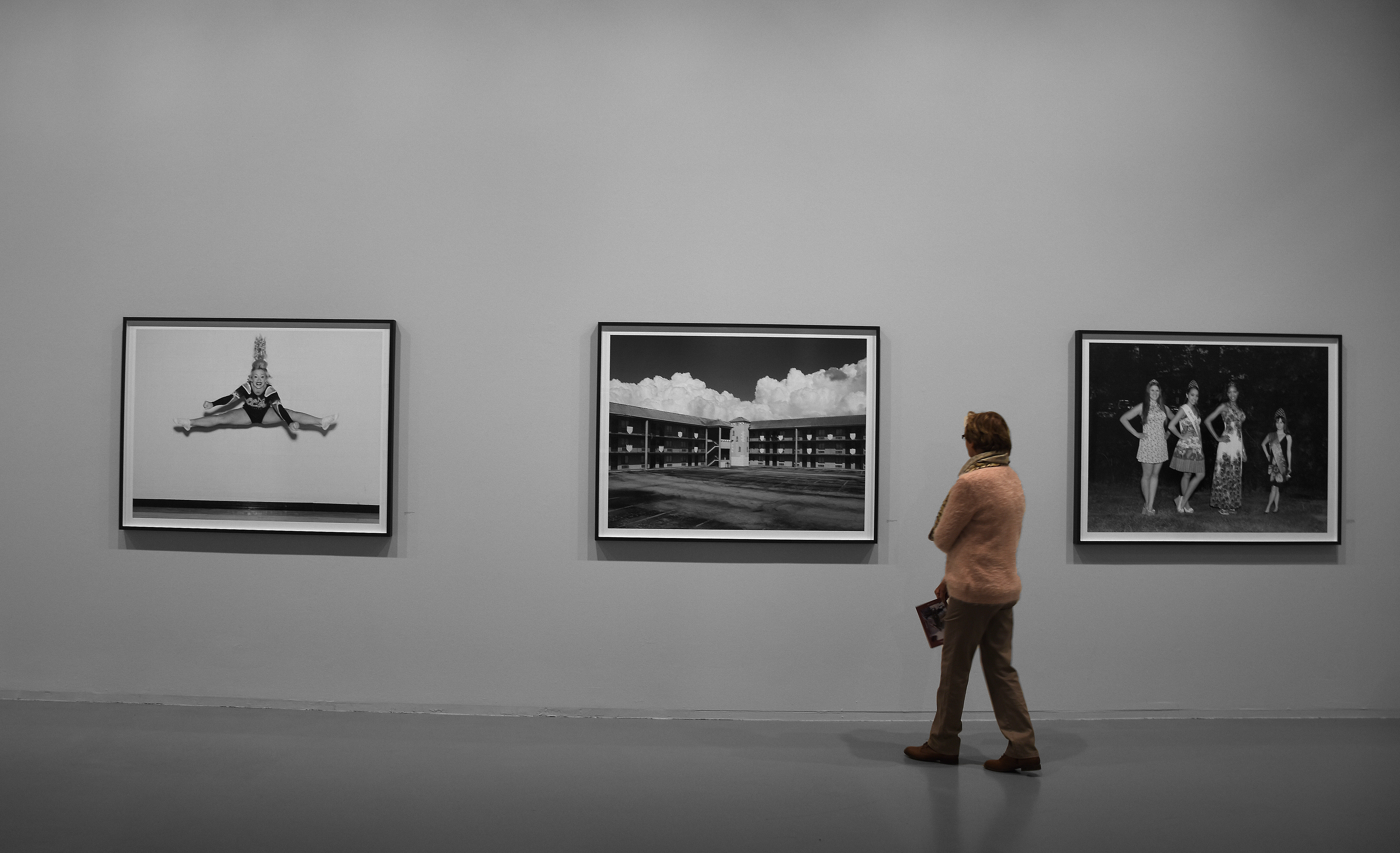
One of the exhibition rooms

== History and programme ==
The museum opened in 1986. The Fotomuseum in Antwerp has a historical and contemporary collection of photography that is given a new presentation every year. Alongside the collection are frequently changing photography exhibitions. Between 1986 and 2018, 106 solo exhibitions have taken place at the museum. 86,7 percent of these exhibitions concerned male photographers. Amongst others, a retrospective of Anton Corbijn was presented. 1997 was the only year in which more women than men had a solo exhibition. Sally Mann, Annie van Gemert and Stephen Feldman were exhibited back then. The 2018 group exhibition Claude, Samuel, Zanele included work of the non-binary artist Zanele Muholi and of Claude Cahun.

The museum publishes the magazine .tiff in Dutch that presents articles on photography with a particular emphasis on fine art photography. The museum also produces Trigger, an English-language magazine first published in November 2019.

The current director is Elviera Velghe, who took over the role from Christoph Ruys.

== Publications ==
- Trigger: Impact. Amsterdam: Fw; Antwerp: FOMU, 2019. ISBN 978-94-90119-82-9.
