= Space Mirror Memorial =

Memorial to astronauts who died in the line of duty

Coordinates: 28°31′31″N 80°40′54″W

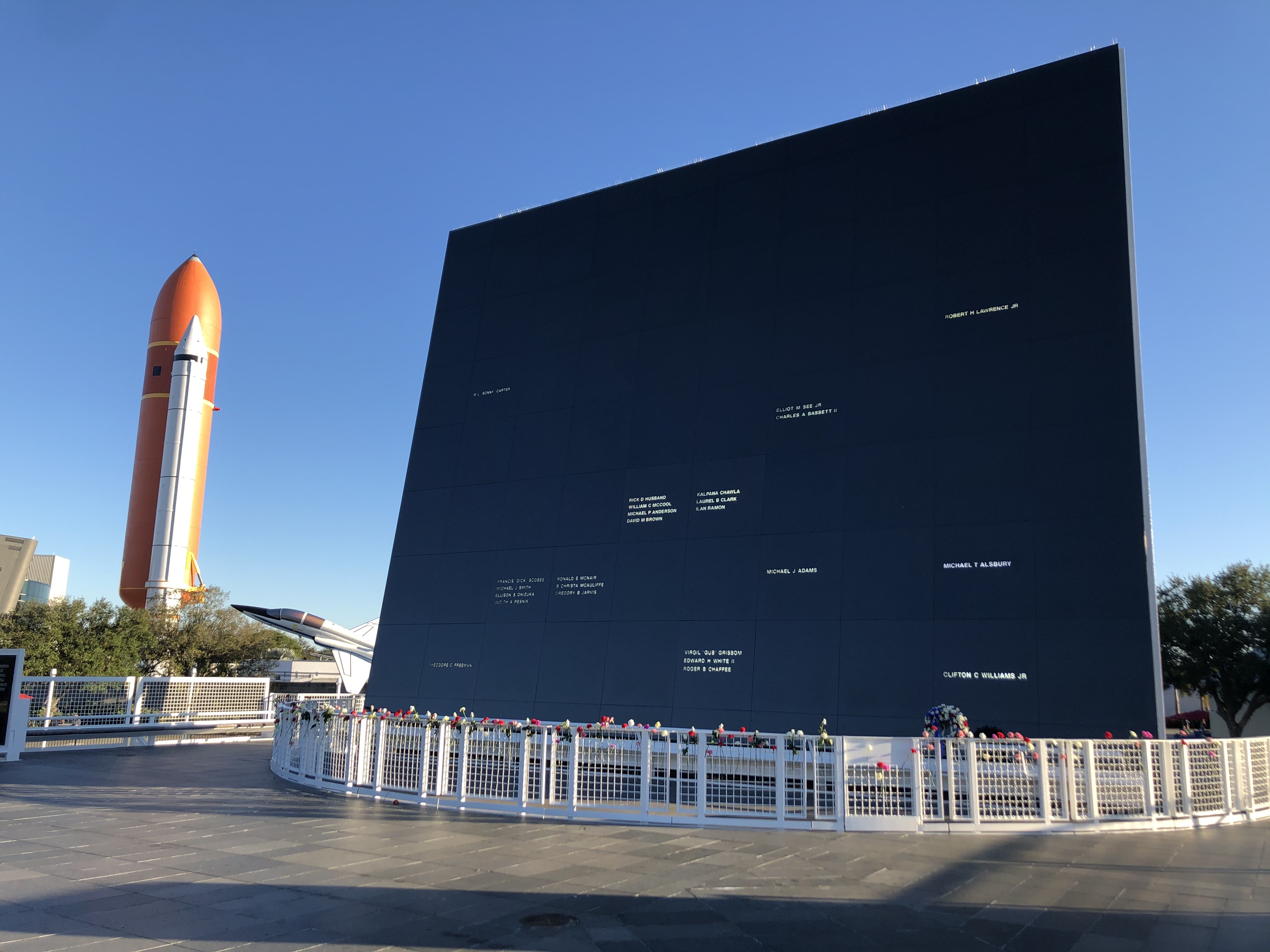
Space Mirror Memorial

The Space Mirror Memorial, which forms part of the larger Astronauts Memorial, is a National Memorial on the grounds of the John F. Kennedy Space Center Visitor Complex on Merritt Island, Florida. It is maintained by the Astronauts Memorial Foundation (AMF), whose offices are located in the NASA Center for Space Education next door to the Visitor Complex. The memorial was designed in 1987 by Holt Hinshaw Pfau Jones, and dedicated on May 9, 1991, to remember the lives of the men and women who have died in the various space programs of the United States, particularly those of NASA. The Astronauts Memorial has been designated by the U.S. Congress "as the national memorial to astronauts who die in the line of duty" (Joint Resolution 214, 1991).

In addition to 20 NASA career astronauts, the memorial includes the names of a U.S. Air Force X-15 test pilot, a U.S. Air Force officer who died while training for a then-classified military space program, a civilian spaceflight participant who died in the Challenger disaster, and an Israeli astronaut who was killed in the Columbia disaster.

In July 2019, the AMF unanimously voted to include private astronauts on the memorial, recognizing the important contributions made to the American space program by private spaceflight crew members. The first private astronaut to be added to the wall was Scaled Composites pilot Michael T. Alsbury, who died in the crash of SpaceShipTwo VSS Enterprise on October 31, 2014. His name was added to the memorial on January 25, 2020.

== Memorial elements ==
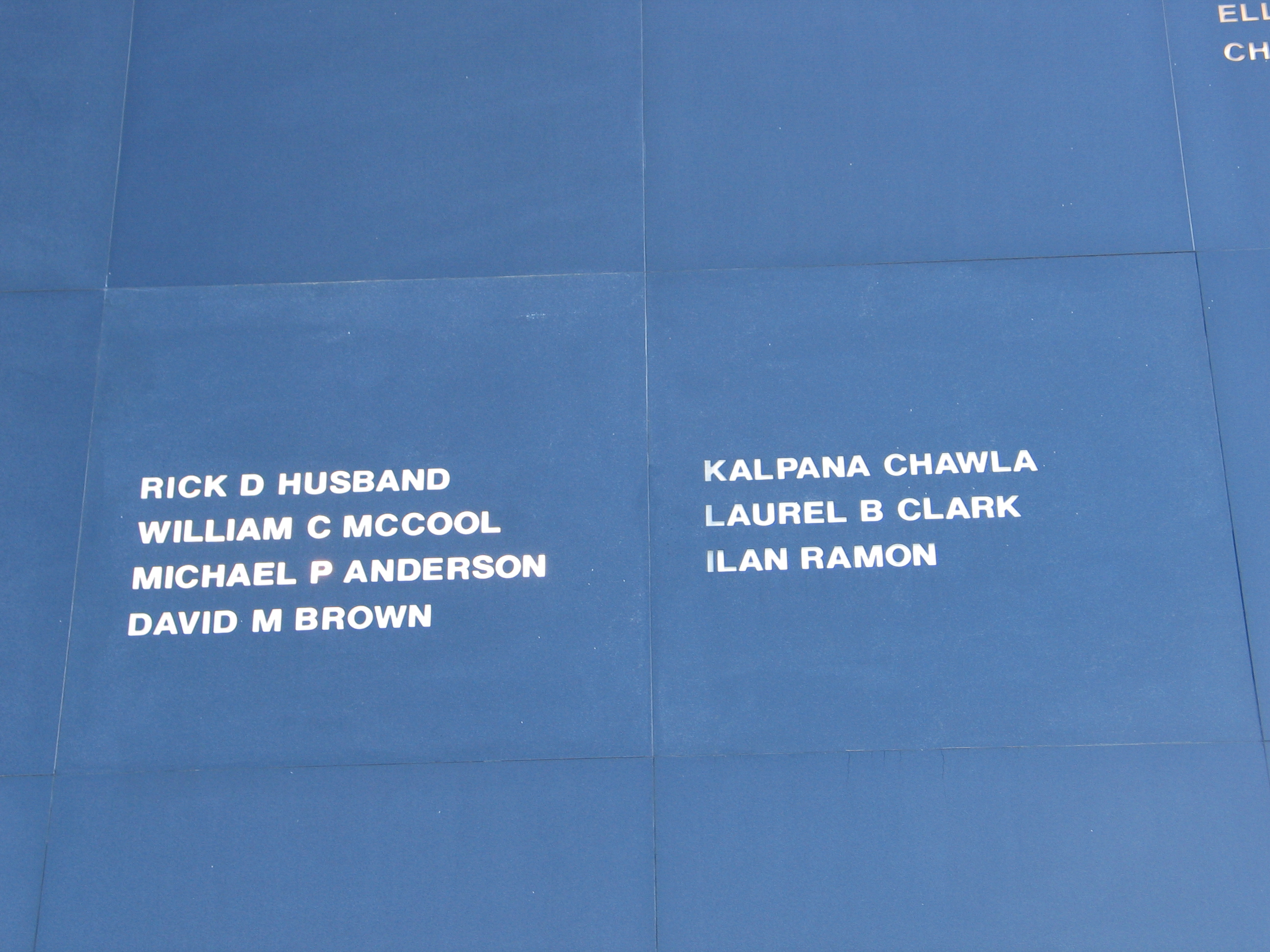
Two panels show the names of the crew of STS-107's Space Shuttle Columbia

The primary feature of the memorial is the Space Mirror, a flat expanse of polished black granite, 42.5 feet high by 50 feet wide (13.0 m × 15.2 m), divided into 90 smaller panels. The names of the 25 astronauts who have died are scattered over the mirror, with names of astronauts who died in the same incident grouped on the same panel, or pairs of adjacent panels. The names are cut completely through the surface, exposing a translucent backing, and filled with translucent acrylic, which is then backlit with LED lights, causing the names to glow, and appear to float in a reflection of the sky.

Near the Space Mirror is a granite wall, bearing pictures and brief biographies of those listed on the Mirror. The Space Mirror Memorial was designed by Wes Jones of Holt Hinshaw Pfau Jones and was commissioned after he won an international design competition.

=== Defunct Sun tracking mechanism ===
The memorial as built incorporated motors and jackscrews to constantly track the Sun across the sky in both pan and tilt axes. Parabolic reflectors on the back side of the mirror would then direct the sunlight through the acrylic panels to brilliantly illuminate the honorees' names with sunlight. Supplemental floodlights were used when the sunlight was inadequate.

In 1997, the tracking system failed, allowing part of the monument to strike a steel beam on an adjacent platform. Insurance paid $375,000 for repair work, but later, the mechanism again ground to a halt, due to further problems with the slewing ring.

Estimated cost of repairs was around $700,000, and the Astronauts Memorial Foundation unanimously decided the money would be better spent on educational programs instead. The floodlights were repositioned and are kept shining 24 hours a day to illuminate the memorial.

== Memorial funding ==
The Space Mirror Memorial cost $6.2 million.

The memorial was to be partially funded by the sales of "Space Shots" trading cards. An agreement was made for 25% of Space Shots profits, in exchange for guaranteeing a $160,000 loan. A projected $400,000 was owed to the Foundation, which was never paid.

The Space Mirror Memorial and the Astronauts Memorial Foundation are funded in part by a specialty vehicle registration plate issued by the state of Florida. Called the Challenger plate, it was first issued in 1987, and was the first specialty plate issued by the state. The third edition, introduced in 2004, includes Columbia in the text, and is now termed the Challenger/Columbia plate. License plates brought in $377,000 in 2009.

One quarter of the revenue from the Apollo 11 Fiftieth Anniversary commemorative coins will go to the Astronauts Memorial Foundation.

== Honorees ==
Only those killed during human spaceflight missions or during training for such missions sponsored by the United States are eligible for inclusion in the memorial. For a comprehensive list of space disasters, see List of space disasters.

The people honored on the memorial are:

- Theodore Freeman, one of the NASA Astronaut Group 3 recruits from 1963, died in a T-38 training accident on October 31, 1964.
- Elliot See and Charles Bassett were killed in a T-38 accident on February 28, 1966, when their aircraft crashed into McDonnell Building 101 on a foggy day. They were originally slated to be the crew of Gemini 9. Bassett was another Group 3 recruit, whereas See was an Astronaut Group 2 recruit from 1962.
- Gus Grissom, Ed White, and Roger Chaffee were in the Apollo 1 capsule for plugs-out test on January 27, 1967, when a short circuit ignited flammable materials in the pressurized pure-oxygen atmosphere. The astronauts died of carbon monoxide poisoning before ground crews could reach them. Grissom, one of the Mercury Seven astronauts, had flown twice before. White conducted the first US spacewalk on Gemini 4 and was another Group 2 recruit. Chaffee, a rookie, was a Group 3 recruit.
- Clifton Williams died in a T-38 training crash on October 5, 1967. Another Group 3 recruit, he was in the Apollo astronaut rotation, and would have been on the crew of Apollo 12. He was also memorialized by a fourth star on the official Apollo 12 mission patch.
- Michael J. Adams died in an X-15 crash on November 15, 1967. He was not a NASA astronaut recruit, but made the memorial by virtue of having earned the Astronaut Badge according to the USAF standard by reaching just over 50 miles in altitude on his fatal flight. He was also in the United States Air Force's Manned Orbiting Laboratory program.
- Robert H. Lawrence Jr., died on December 8, 1967, when the F-104 he was in as an instructor pilot for a flight test trainee crashed and his ejection seat parachute failed to open. He was in the Manned Orbiting Laboratory program at the time, and could have been among the first African-American astronauts had he survived to take NASA's offer for all under-35 MOL candidates to join their space program when MOL was scrapped in 1969.
- On January 28, 1986, Space Shuttle Challenger broke apart 73 seconds after liftoff on mission STS-51-L due to a defect in one of the solid rocket boosters. All seven crew members—Francis "Dick" Scobee, Michael J. Smith, Ronald McNair, Gregory Jarvis, Judith Resnik, Ellison Onizuka, and Christa McAuliffe—died. Scobee, McNair, Resnik, and Onizuka had flown before. Resnik was the second American woman in space, after Sally Ride. McAuliffe was participating via the Teacher in Space Project.
- M. L. "Sonny" Carter died on April 5, 1991, in the crash of Atlantic Southeast Airlines Flight 2311. Carter was a passenger traveling on NASA business. He had flown on STS-33 and was in training for STS-42 at the time.
- On February 1, 2003, Space Shuttle Columbia disintegrated on re-entry at the end of mission STS-107 due to damage during ascent. The crew was Rick Husband, William C. McCool, David M. Brown, Kalpana Chawla, Michael P. Anderson, Laurel Clark and Ilan Ramon. Husband, Chawla, and Anderson were veterans. Ramon was a pilot in the Israeli Air Force.
- On October 31, 2014, SpaceShipTwo broke apart during its fourth powered flight, killing co-pilot Michael T. Alsbury and severely injuring the pilot. Both were flying for Scaled Composites on a mission for Virgin Galactic.

== Astronauts Memorial Foundation ==
The Astronauts Memorial Foundation was founded shortly (summer of 1986) after the Challenger disaster (January 28, 1986) by architect Alan Helman, then Congressman and astronaut Bill Nelson, Leland McKee, business director, Martin Marietta (now Lockheed Martin), Randy Berridge, executive with AT&T, Florida Governor Bob Graham, Ralph Turlington, Florida Commissioner of Education, Senator and Astronaut Jake Garn and other Central Florida and national leaders. On September 4, 1986, Alan Helman and Leland McKee were presented a resolution by Governor Bob Graham and the Florida cabinet fully endorsing the efforts of The Astronauts Memorial Foundation. This included fundraising efforts of the 67 county Challenger Run Walk a Thon and specialty license plate. The Astronauts Memorial Foundation license plate, designed by artist Robert McCall, was Florida’s first vanity plate sold starting in December 1986. The automobile license plate went on raising millions for educational purposes in the State of Florida. Other educational efforts continue to this day. The president of the Astronaut Memorial Foundation was Stephen Feldman from 1999 to 2012. He was paid $303,000 annually. This was criticized as being the highest among 100 of Brevard County non-profits. His salary represented 18.3 percent of the fund's $1.8 million budget in fiscal year 2009. He defended his salary by saying that he was the sole fundraiser and the chief financial officer for the foundation.

Thad Altman became President and CEO of the Astronauts Memorial Foundation in August 2012. The Board of Directors include Eileen Collins - Chairman, Jack Kirschenbaum - Vice Chairman, Gregory H. Johnson - Treasurer, Sheryl L. Chaffee - Secretary.

== Gallery ==
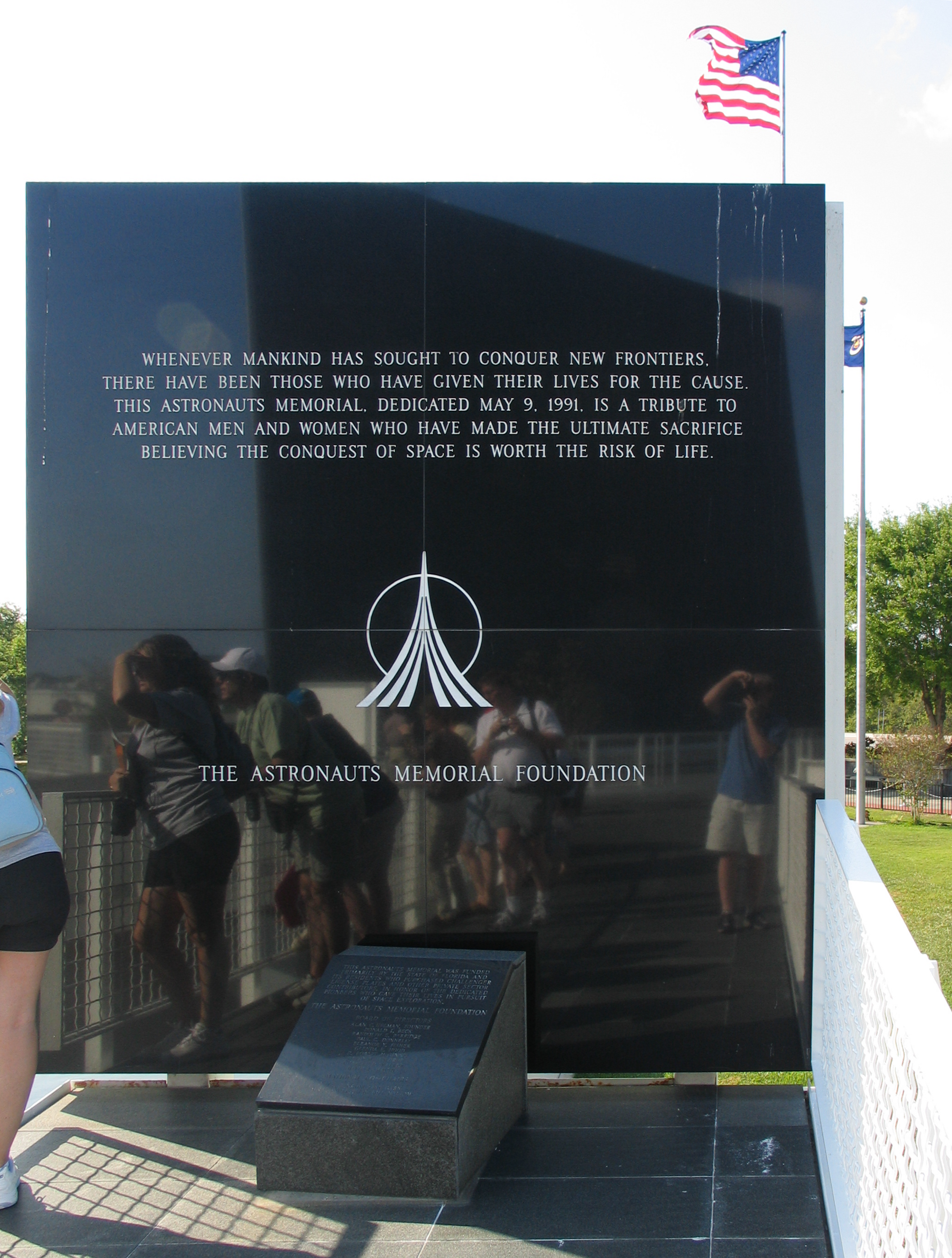
Space Mirror dedication

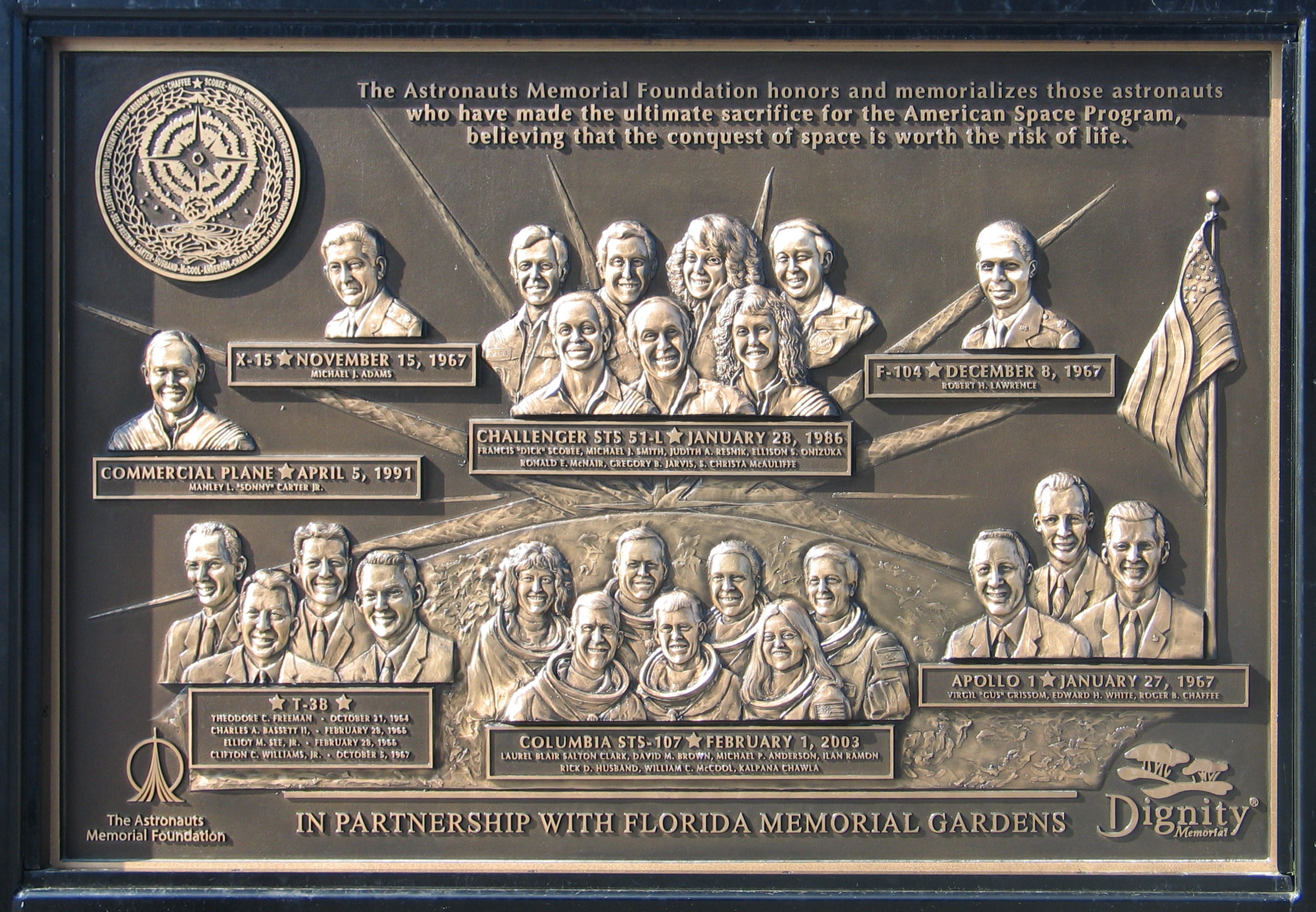
The Dignity Memorial

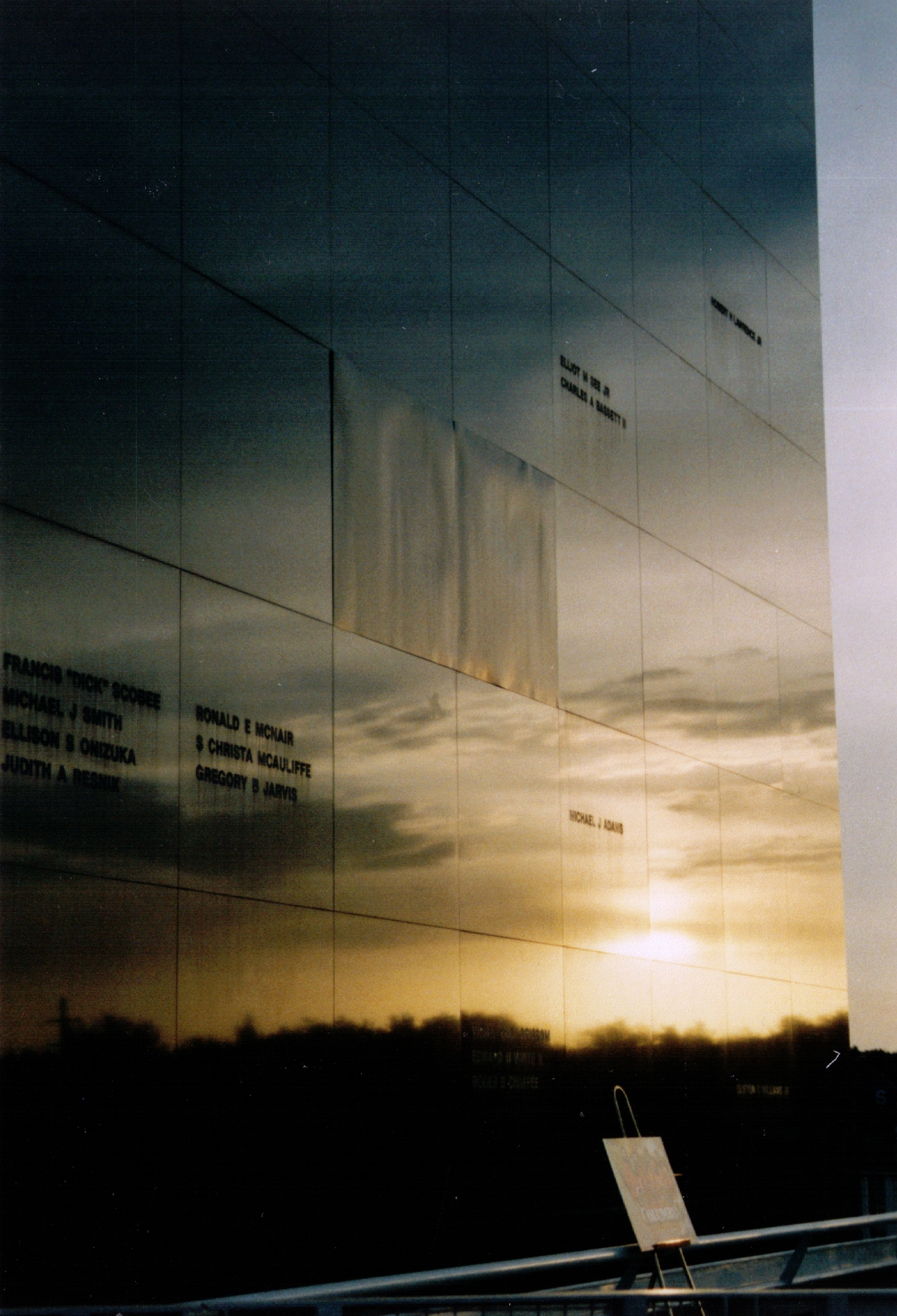
The Space Mirror at sunset

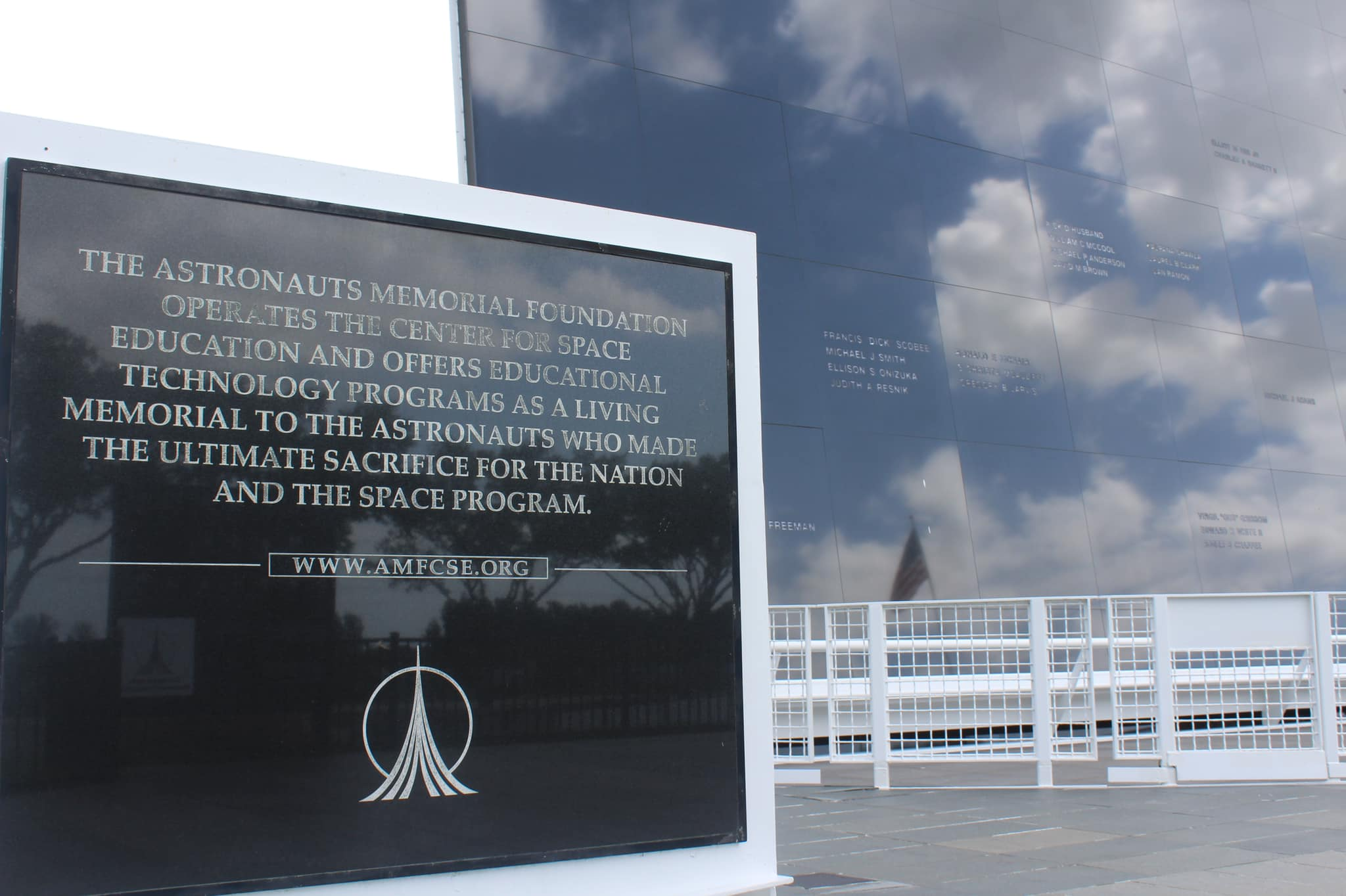
The entrance to the Space Mirror Memorial

== See also ==
- Fallen Astronaut, a memorial to deceased astronauts and cosmonauts placed on the Moon during the 1971 Apollo 15 mission.
- List of national memorials of the United States
