= Clifton Williams =

American astronaut (1932–1967)

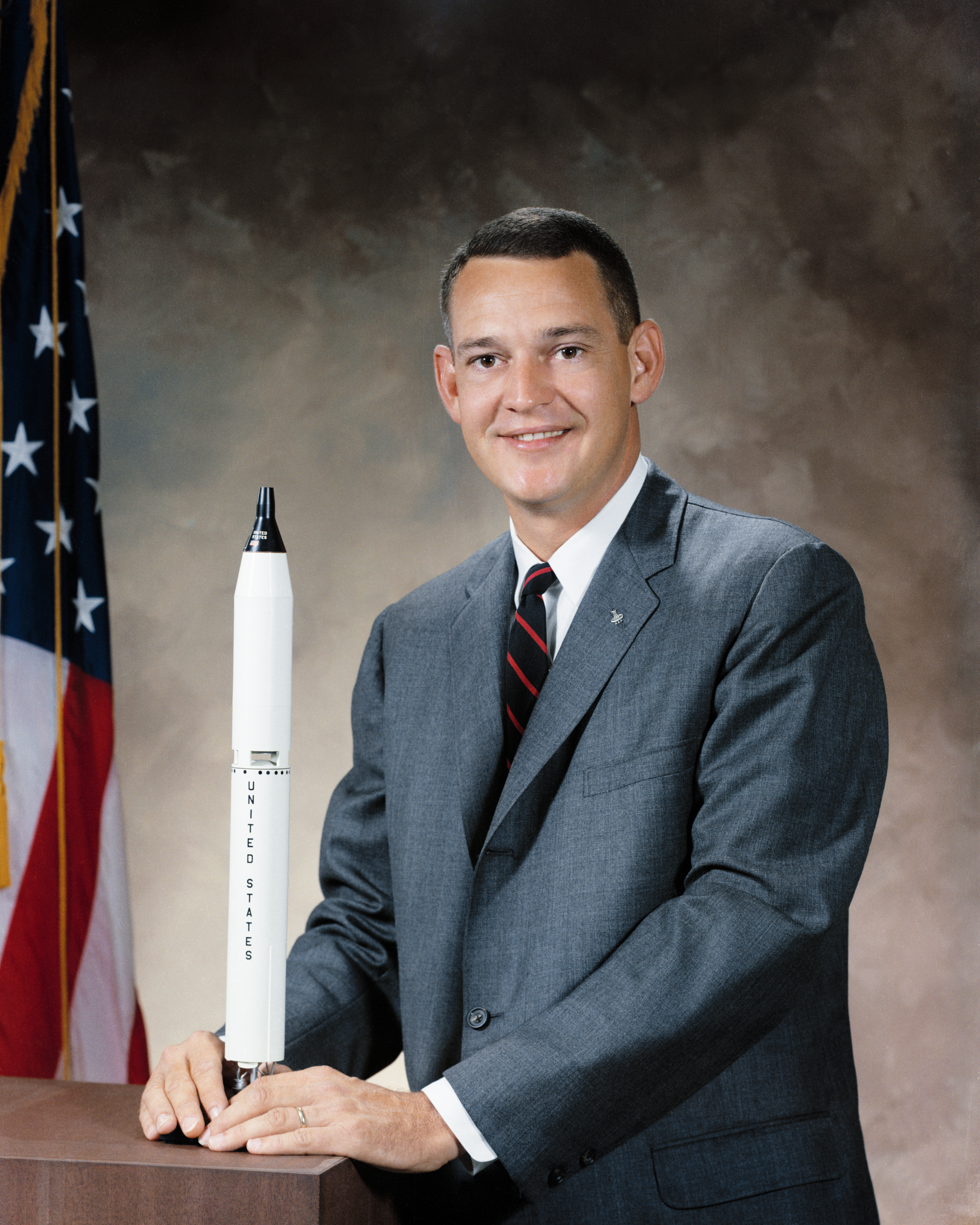
- Williams c. 1964
- Born: Clifton Curtis Williams, Jr. September 26, 1932; Mobile, Alabama, U.S.
- Died: October 5, 1967 (aged 35) near Tallahassee, Florida, U.S.
- Resting place: Arlington National Cemetery
- Education: Spring Hill College; Auburn University (BS)
- Spouse: Jane Elizabeth Lansche (m. 1964)
- Children: 2
- Space career

NASA astronaut
- Rank: Major, USMC
- Selection: NASA Group 3 (1963)

Clifton Curtis Williams Jr. (September 26, 1932 – October 5, 1967), was an American naval aviator, test pilot, mechanical engineer, major in the United States Marine Corps, and NASA astronaut, who was killed in a plane crash; he never went into space. The crash was caused by a mechanical failure in a NASA T-38 jet trainer, which he was piloting to visit his parents in Mobile, Alabama. The failure caused the flight controls to stop responding, and although he activated the ejection seat, it did not save him. He was the fourth astronaut from NASA's Astronaut Group 3 to have died, the first two (Charles Bassett and Theodore Freeman) having been killed in separate T-38 flights, and the third (Roger B. Chaffee) in the Apollo 1 fire earlier that year. The aircraft crashed in Florida near Tallahassee within an hour of departing Patrick AFB.

Before becoming an astronaut, Williams received his Bachelor of Science degree in Mechanical Engineering from Auburn University in 1954 and joined the U.S. Marine Corps through the Naval Reserve Officers Training Corps (NROTC). He became a Naval Aviator in 1956 and joined the Fleet Marine Force. In 1961, he graduated from the U.S. Naval Test Pilot School. As a test pilot, he worked for three years in the Carrier Suitability Branch of the Flight Test Division at NAS Patuxent River. In 1962, Williams, then a Captain, became the first pilot to land a two-seat jet on the aircraft carrier from the rear cockpit. At the time of his death, he was 35 and held the rank of Major.

Although he was never on a spaceflight, he served as backup pilot for the mission Gemini 10, which took place in July 1966. Following this mission, he was selected to be the Lunar Module Pilot for an Apollo mission to the Moon commanded by Pete Conrad. Following Williams's death, Alan Bean became Lunar Module Pilot for Conrad's mission, which ended up being Apollo 12, the second lunar landing. In his honor—on Bean's suggestion—the mission patch had four stars instead of three; one for each of three astronauts and one for Williams. Also, Bean placed Williams's naval aviator wings and silver astronaut pin to rest on the lunar surface during his moonwalk.

== Biography ==
=== Early life and education ===
Williams was born on September 26, 1932, in Mobile, Alabama, to parents Clifton Curtis Williams Sr. (1909–1968) and Gertrude (née Medicus) Williams (1913–2002). He had a younger brother, Richard, born in 1935. Williams was active in the Boy Scouts of America, where he achieved its second-highest rank, Life Scout. Williams attended Murphy High School in Mobile, graduating in 1949. For the next two years he attended Spring Hill College, studying medicine, but transferred to Auburn University, from where he received a Bachelor of Science degree in mechanical engineering in 1954.

=== Flight experience ===
Upon graduation in 1954, he received his commission in the U.S. Marine Corps through the Naval Reserve Officer Training Corps (Navy ROTC) on August 9, 1954, and subsequently reported to The Basic School at Marine Corps Base Quantico, Virginia, and after completing it, he was sent to NAS Pensacola, Florida, for flight training. He became a naval aviator in August 1956, and served with operational tactical jet squadrons of the Fleet Marine Force. He then attended the U.S. Naval Test Pilot School at NAS Patuxent River, Maryland. Following graduation from USNTPS in June 1961, as part of Class 28, he was test pilot for three years in the Carrier Suitability Branch of the Flight Test Division at NAS Patuxent River. His work there included both land-based and shipboard tests of the F-8E, TF-8A, F-8E (attack), and A-4E aircraft and the automatic carrier landing system. In 1962, as project officer on the F-8 Crusader new jet trainer, Williams, then a captain, became the first pilot to land a two-seat jet on the aircraft carrier from the rear cockpit.

While at NAS Patuxent River, he was selected for the NASA astronaut program in the third group of prospective Gemini and Apollo astronauts in late 1963.

Of the 2,500 hours flying time he accumulated, more than 2,100 hours were in jet aircraft.

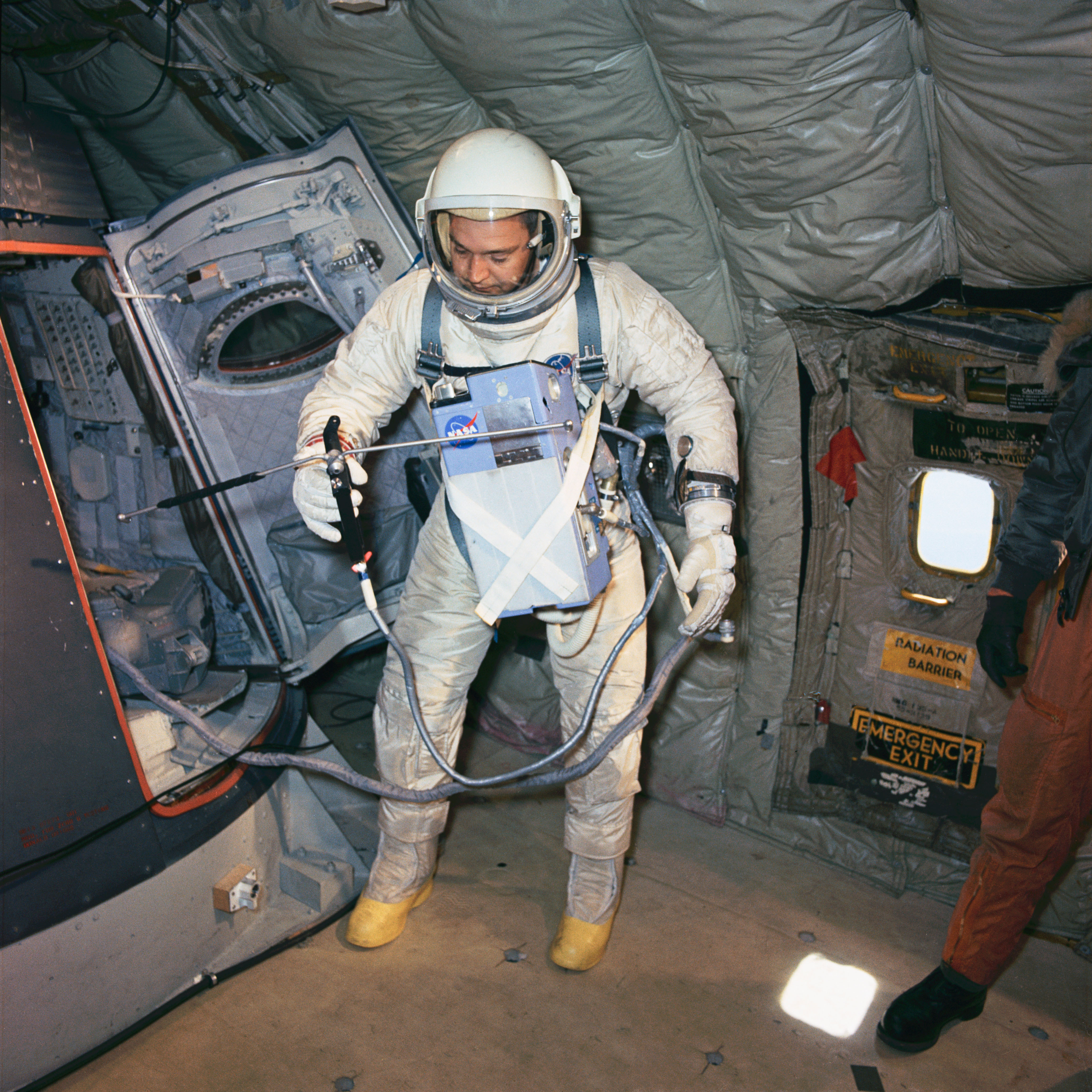
Williams training as Gemini 10 backup pilot aboard a KC-135 reduced-gravity aircraft

=== NASA career ===
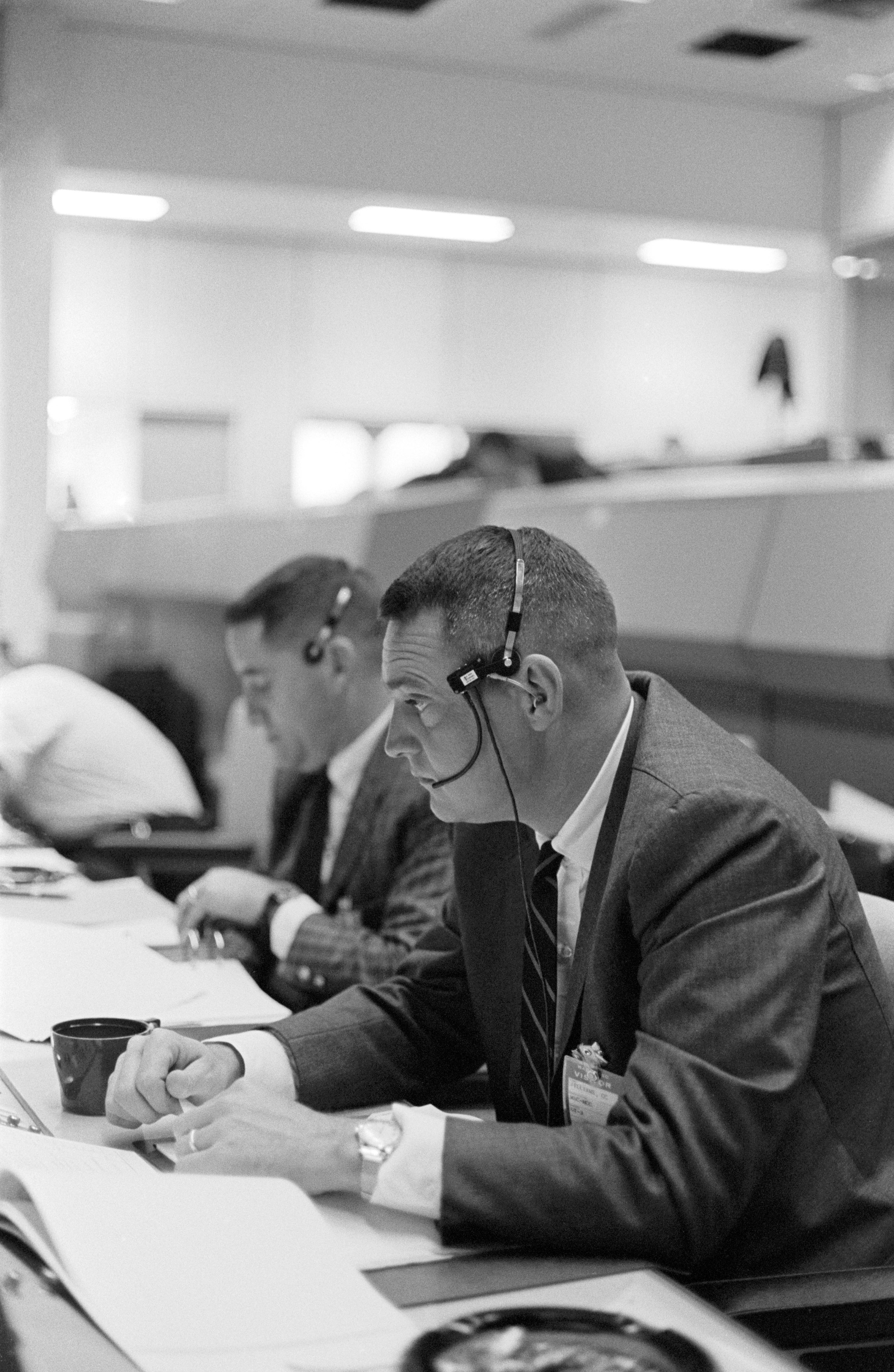
Williams at the consoles in Mission Control in 1965 during the Gemini 3 mission

I'd like to go on every flight. Of course, if you said which mission I would most like to have, I'd say the first lunar flight you make from the standpoint of personal satisfaction and accomplishment.

— Answering the question which mission he would like to fly.

On October 18, 1963, Major Williams was named by NASA as one of its third group of astronauts, along with thirteen others. This group included Buzz Aldrin, who took part in the first lunar landing in 1969, as well as Roger B. Chaffee, who died in the Apollo 1 fire in 1967.

The third group of astronauts performed jungle training. Williams partnered with Rusty Schweickart.

Williams served as the backup pilot for Gemini 10, which took place in July 1966. Later that year, Pete Conrad chose Williams to be the Lunar Module Pilot on the mission for which Conrad was commander, which would serve as the back-up Apollo 9 crew, and later become Apollo 12. After his death, his position on Conrad's crew was filled by Alan Bean, who had been his commander on the Gemini 10 backup crew.

=== Marriage and children ===
Williams was the first bachelor astronaut, which changed when he married Jane Elizabeth "Beth" Lansche, a former waterskiing performer at the Cypress Gardens theme park in Florida. Upon the announcement of their engagement, the press feigned disappointment over the loss of the nation's only bachelor astronaut. The couple met in June 1957, and were married on July 1, 1964, in St. Paul's Catholic Church in New Bern, North Carolina, which was Lansche's hometown. The couple had two children. Their first daughter, Catherine Ann, was born on January 6, 1967. Their second daughter, Jane Dee Williams, was born on May 31, 1968, nearly eight months after Williams's death.

=== Death ===
On October 5, 1967, Williams was flying from Cape Canaveral back to Houston, with a stop in Mobile to visit his father who was dying of cancer. A mechanical failure caused the aileron controls to jam on his T-38 jet trainer near Tallahassee, Florida, causing an uncontrollable aileron roll. The aircraft dove straight down, between pine trees 100 feet (30 m) apart, and crashed without touching them, although it did singe them from a fire caused by the crash. The jet was flying at 22,300 feet (6,800 m) when it performed a sudden roll to the left and dove nearly vertically into the earth at 700 mph (1,130 km/h).

Williams ejected at an altitude of 1,500 feet (460 m), but the aircraft was traveling too fast and too low for the seat to land safely. An Air Force spokesman stated, "The plane disintegrated and the body disintegrated with it."

== Honors ==
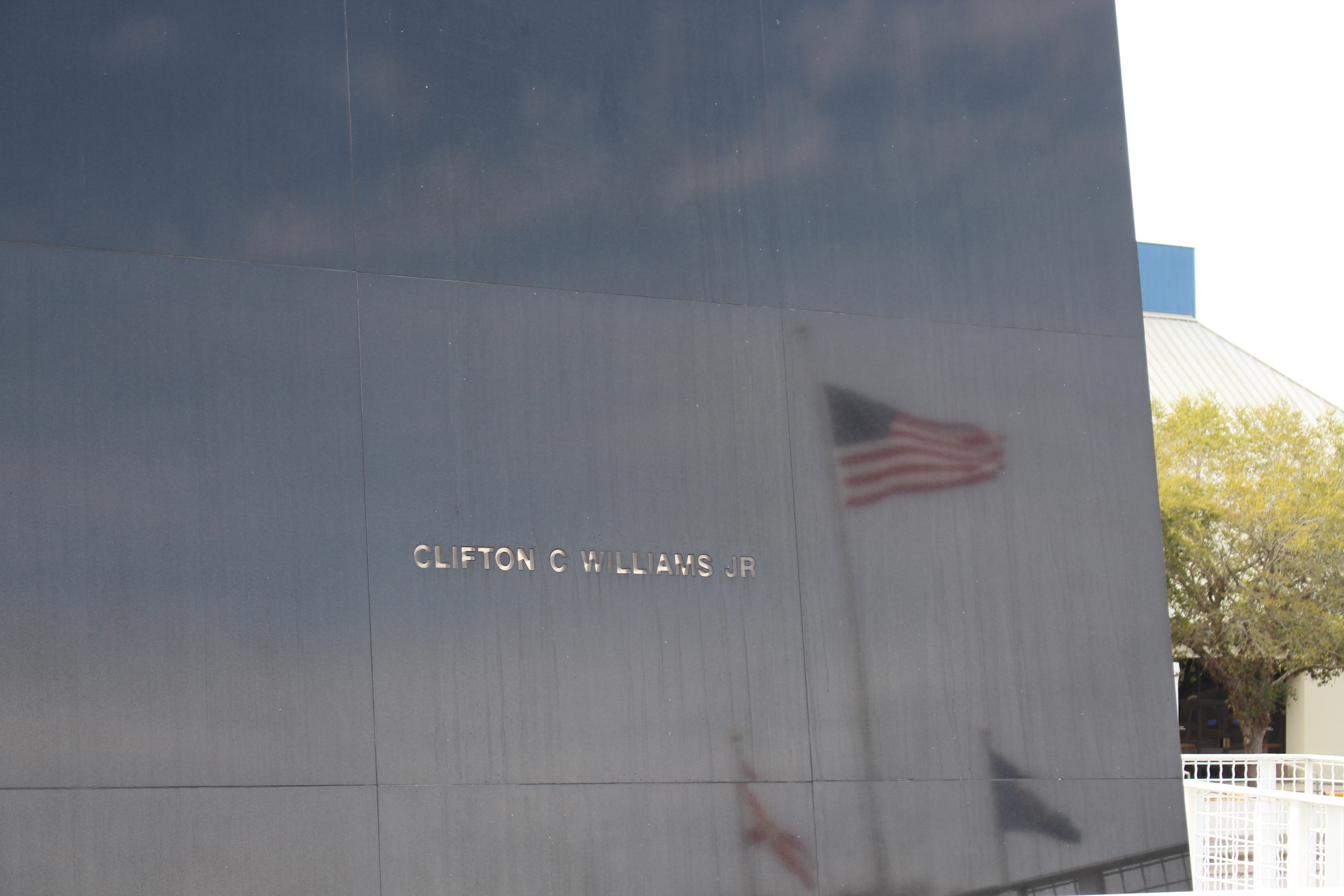
Space Mirror Memorial C.C. Williams

The Apollo 12 mission patch has four stars on it: one each for the three astronauts who flew the mission, and one for Williams (at Alan Bean's suggestion). Also, his naval aviator wings and silver astronaut pin were placed to rest on the lunar surface in his honor, left there by astronaut Bean during Apollo 12 in November 1969.

Williams was buried with full military honors in Arlington National Cemetery. Williams's name appears on NASA's Space Mirror Memorial at the Kennedy Space Center in Florida.

In the 1998 HBO miniseries From the Earth to the Moon, Williams was played by Jim Leavy.

== See also ==
- Fallen Astronaut
- List of spaceflight-related accidents and incidents
- The Astronaut Monument

== Bibliography ==
- Burgess, Colin; Doolan, Kate; Vis, Bert (2003). Fallen Astronauts: Heroes Who Died Reaching for the Moon. Bibson Books. ISBN 978-0803262126.
- Chaikin, Andrew (2007). A Man on the Moon: The Voyages of the Apollo Astronauts. London: Penguin Books. ISBN 978-0-14-311235-8. OCLC 958200469.
