= Ovid C. Lewis =

President of Nova Southeastern University
- In office 1994–1997
- Preceded by: Stephen Feldman
- Succeeded by: Ray F. Ferrero Jr.

Personal details
- Born: August 6, 1932 Shelby, North Carolina
- Died: January 26, 2011 (aged 78) Fort Lauderdale, Florida
- Education: AB & JD Duke University; JSD Yale University

Ovid C. Lewis (August 6, 1932 – January 26, 2011) was an American academic, and was the fourth president of Nova Southeastern University. Lewis graduated from Duke University and Yale University. He became the President of Nova Southeastern University in 1994 and was president until 1997.
