= Warren J. Winstead =

American academic (1927-2001)

Dr. Warren J. Winstead

President of Nova Southeastern University
- In office 1964–1970
- Succeeded by: Abraham S. Fischler

Personal details
- Born: November 10, 1927 Virginia
- Died: December 3, 2001 (aged 74) Callao, Virginia
- Spouse: Elizabeth Winstead
- Children: Warren J. Winstead, Jr. Wendy Winstead; Mellie Winstead; Major Scott Winstead
- Education: BS, MS University of Richmond; Ph.D. Harvard University
- Profession: President & Professor

Warren J. Winstead (November 10, 1927 – December 3, 2001) was an American academic, and was the first president of Nova Southeastern University. Winstead graduated from Harvard University with a PhD. (NSU says "He obtained his B.A. and M.S. from the University of Richmond. He later obtained a C.A.S. and Ed.D. from Harvard University.") He became the President of Nova Southeastern University in 1964 and was president until 1970.
