= Abraham S. Fischler =

Dr. Abraham S. Fischler

President of Nova Southeastern University
- In office 1970–1992
- Preceded by: Warren J. Winstead
- Succeeded by: Stephen Feldman

Personal details
- Born: January 21, 1928 Brooklyn, New York
- Died: April 3, 2017 (aged 89) Hollywood, Florida
- Education: BA, MA, & Ed.D. Columbia University

Abraham S. Fischler (January 21, 1928 – April 3, 2017) was an American academic, and was the second president of Nova Southeastern University. Fischler graduated from Columbia University in 1959 with his Ed.D. He went on to serve as assistant professor of Science Education at Harvard University and Professor of Education at the University of California, Berkeley before joining the fledgling Nova University in 1966. Fischler served as Dean of Graduate Studies and Director of the Behavioral Sciences Center from 1966 to 1969. He became the President of Nova Southeastern University in 1970 and was president until 1992.

During his tenure as president, Nova Southeastern University developed and offered the first doctoral distance education program in the country in 1971. Fischler's distance education program was a precursor to modern online education programs but was the first of its kind at the time that it was created. Today, Nova Southeastern University remains a leader in distance education, offering programs online and via video conferences, at national and international instruction sites, and at the university's physical campuses. More than 11,000 students are enrolled in Fischler School of Education programs yearly.

After retiring from the Presidency, Fischler served on the board of Broward County Public Schools from 1994 to 1998. He has also previously served as a consultant to the Ford Foundation, to various state departments of education, and to school districts in other states. He has authored numerous textbooks, articles, and other publications concerning teaching methods and science education. Today, Fischler is President Emeritus and University Professor at Nova Southeastern University, and serves on the boards of a variety of community, arts, and education organizations. He continues to be active in the area of K-12 education reform, and publishes a blog on the topic titled "The Student is the Class".
