= Ray F. Ferrero Jr. =

American academic and attorney

President of Nova Southeastern University
- In office 1997–2009
- Preceded by: Ovid C. Lewis
- Succeeded by: George L. Hanbury II

Personal details
- Born: January 17, 1934 (age 92) New York City, New York
- Education: University of Florida, St. John's University

Ray F. Ferrero Jr. (born January 17, 1934) is an American academic who was the fifth President of Nova Southeastern University. Ferrero graduated with his bachelor's degree from St. John's University. He received his Juris Doctor from the University of Florida in 1960. He became the President of Nova Southeastern University in 1998. Ferrero served as the President of the Florida Bar in 1987.
