= Space Shots (trading cards) =

Space Shots was a non-sports trading card series produced beginning in 1990 by Space Ventures Inc. of Houston, Texas. Three series of cards were produced from 1990 to 1992, while the last, fourth series (of the intended five) came in two different issues of special 3-D space cards in 1993.

== Concept ==
The card collection was launched in 1990 by Ed White III, son of astronaut Ed White (II), who died in 1967. Space Ventures collected investment capital from several astronauts, including Michael Collins, Eugene Cernan, and Jim Lovell, to fund the project.

== History ==
Pack-inserted entry blanks for a “$150,000 Space Trivia Challenge” enticed both young and adult collectors to read the card backs and answer 25 space flight history questions, with entry blanks being sent by mail to those interested. The first 100 people to submit correct answers to 100 trivia questions posed on the first four series of cards were to receive a $1,500 scholarship.

The original promo sheet for the first series featured an uncut card sheet of six different card images and featured the pre-printed signatures of Lovell, Cernan, and Pete Conrad.

The first collectors' edition of 25,000 sets of 110 cards sold out in 10 months.

The promo card for the second 110-card series was an uncut six-card sheet signed by Lovell, Bruce McCandless, and cosmonaut Vladimir Dzhanibekov. The series of 100,000 sets was issued in 1991 and was sold for $18 in card shops and by mail.

The promo sheet for the third series, entitled the International Edition, featured a packet of nine cards handsigned by Lovell, Dzhanibekov, and Buzz Aldrin. Most of the astronauts and cosmonauts eventually left the project.

A special edition set, the fourth released, was called "Moon/Mars". This series retailed for $30.

The cards were embraced by the National Education Association.

== Controversy ==
The fifth and final series was never produced. Originally, 25% of every series' profits were designated for the Astronaut Memorial Foundation to build the Center for Space Education at Kennedy Space Center, in exchange for guaranteeing a $160,000 loan. However, the proceeds were never forwarded despite a projected $400,000 being owed to the Foundation. The $150,000 in scholarships for the 100 trivia contest winners was also never awarded.

Some astronauts refuse to sign cards from the Space Shots series.
