= Stephen Feldman =

Dr. Stephen Feldman

President of Nova Southeastern University
- In office 1992–1994
- Preceded by: Abraham S. Fischler
- Succeeded by: Ovid C. Lewis

Personal details
- Born: 11 September 1944 (age 81) New York

Stephen Feldman (born 11 September 1944) is an American academic, and was the third president of Nova Southeastern University in 1992 and served until 1994. He was the president of the Astronaut Memorial Foundation from 1999 to 2012. Feldman served as a member of Governor Jeb Bush's Transition Team.

== Biography ==
In 1969, Feldman was an Associate Professor of Finance and Chairman at the Department of Banking, Finance and Investments at Hofstra University until 1977. That year, the Western Connecticut State University appointed Feldman as the Dean of the Ancell School of Business with the 1977–1981 tenure. Feldman was the President of Western Connecticut State University (1981–1992), where the 3300-seat athletic arena was named after Feldman. It was between 1996 and 1999 when Feldman was the Vice President of California State University, Long Beach.

He was a guest lecturer for two years at the Graduate School of Management at MIT, and lectured for twenty years in the IBM Advanced Management School. In addition to numerous articles, Feldman co-authored two books, "Smarter Money" and "The Handbook of Wealth Management."

a member of the Executive Committee of the Board of Governors for the Ukleja Center for Ethical Leadership.

=== Board member ===
Chairman of the Board of Overseers for the Bisk College of Business, Florida Institute of Technology.

=== Business career ===
Between 1995–1996, Feldman served as the Vice President of Ethan Allen, the furniture manufacturer. As a member of the Board of Directors, Feldman has served for: Kane Industries, Science Horizons, Inc., Danbury Hospital, Florida Space Business Roundtable, and United Way. Chambers of Commerce in both Connecticut and Florida appointed Feldman.

== For NASA ==
Feldman served as the Chairman of the Board of Directors of the National Space Club, Florida Committee. After thirteen years as the President of the Foundation, he retired as the President and the CEO of the Astronauts Memorial Foundation on 31 August 2012. The Board of Directors of the Astronauts Memorial Foundation voted to give him the title of President Emeritus in honor of his years of service.

The Astronauts Memorial Foundation has paid Feldman yearly $303,000, which was criticized as being the highest among 100 of Brevard County non-profits. The salary represented 18.3% of the fund's $1.8 million budget in fiscal year 2009. He defended his salary by saying that he was the sole fundraiser and the chief financial officer for the foundation.

A member of the Board of Directors for the U.S. Space Walk of Fame Foundation.

== Awards and mentions ==
- The recipient of the NASA Public Service Medal.

Academic offices
Preceded by Robert M. Bersi (1975-1981)	President of Western Connecticut State University; Stephen Feldman (1981-1992)	Succeeded by James R. Roach
