= NASA Astronaut Group 3 =

1963 human spaceflight selection of 14 candidates; "The Fourteen"

The Fourteen
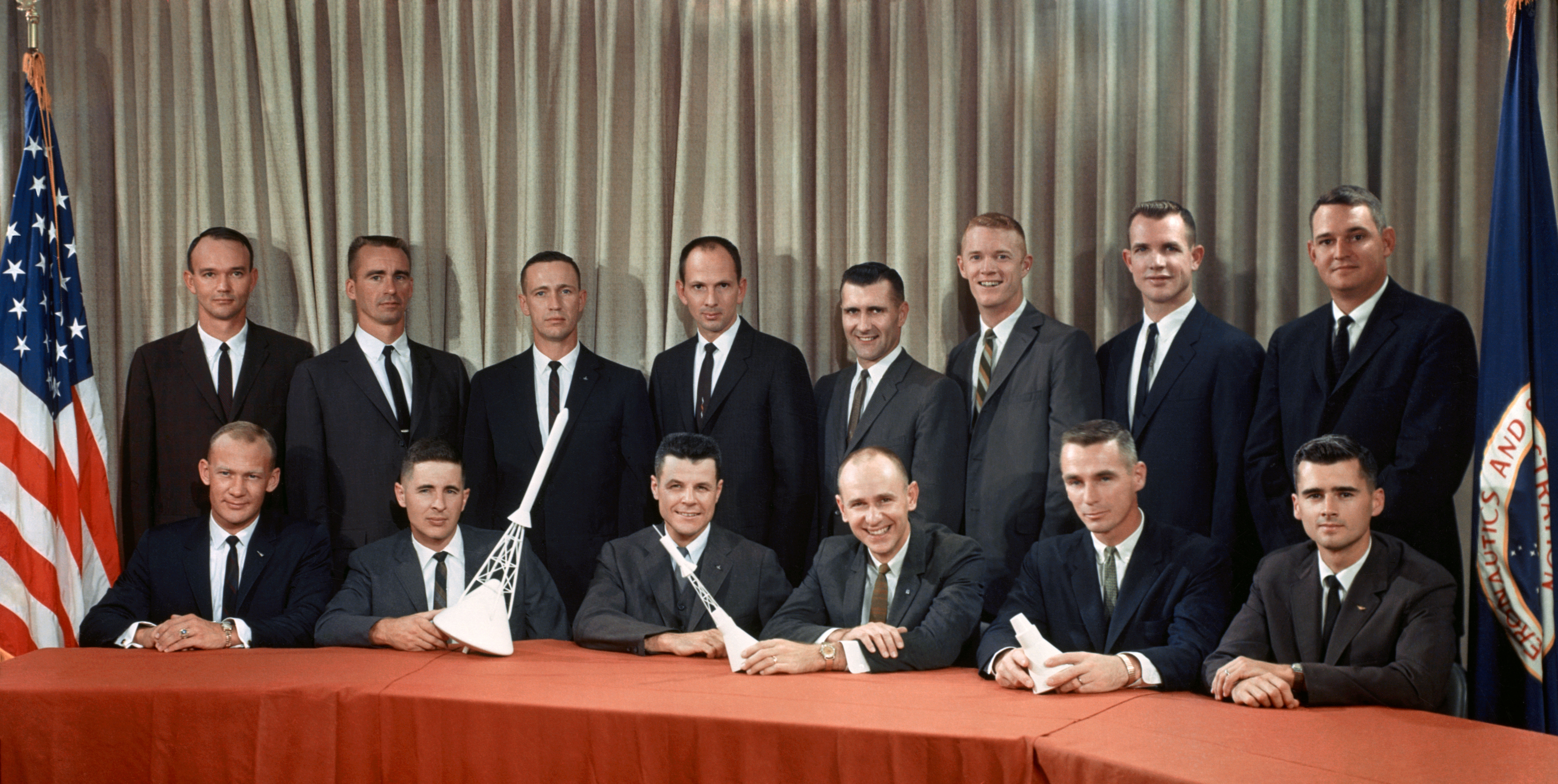
- Group 3 astronauts Back row, left to right: Michael Collins, Walter Cunningham, Donn Eisele, Theodore Freeman, Richard Gordon, Rusty Schweickart, David Scott, Clifton Williams; Front row, left to right: Buzz Aldrin, Bill Anders, Charles Bassett, Alan Bean, Gene Cernan, Roger Chaffee
- Year selected: 1963; 63 years ago
- Number selected: 14

NASA Astronaut Group 3 (nicknamed "The Fourteen") was a group of fourteen astronauts selected by NASA for the Gemini and Apollo programs. The Apollo spacecraft had a crew of three, so more astronauts were required. Their selection was announced in October 1963. Four died in training accidents before they could fly in space: Theodore Freeman, Charles Bassett and C. C. Williams in air crashes, and Roger Chaffee in the Apollo 1 fire. All of the surviving ten flew Apollo missions. Five also flew Gemini missions: David Scott, Gene Cernan, Michael Collins, Richard Gordon and Buzz Aldrin. Aldrin, Alan Bean, Cernan and Scott walked on the Moon, and Bill Anders, Collins and Gordon orbited the Moon but did not land.

Seven were from the United States Air Force (Aldrin, Anders, Bassett, Collins, Donn Eisele, Freeman and Scott), four from the United States Navy (Bean, Cernan, Chaffee and Gordon), one (Williams) was from the United States Marine Corps, and two (Walter Cunningham and Rusty Schweickart) were selected as civilians, although both had prior military experience. Like the two groups before them, all members of the group were male and white. All were married except for Williams, who became the first bachelor astronaut. Group 3 was the first to waive the requirement that candidates have a test pilot background, with 1,000 hours of jet aircraft experience accepted as a substitute. This applied to Aldrin, Anders, Cernan, Chaffee, Cunningham and Schweickart; all the others were test pilots. On average, its members were younger, slightly taller and heavier than those of the previous two groups, and better educated.

In preparation for flights to the Moon, the fourteen astronauts received scientific and technical classroom instruction. Field trips were conducted to teach them geology and train them in survival techniques.

== Background ==
The launch of the Sputnik 1 satellite by the Soviet Union on October 4, 1957, started a Cold War technological and ideological competition with the United States known as the Space Race. The demonstration of American technological inferiority came as a profound shock to the American public. In response to the Sputnik crisis, the U.S. President Dwight D. Eisenhower created a new civilian agency, the National Aeronautics and Space Administration (NASA), to oversee an American space program. NASA created an American spaceflight project called Project Mercury, which aimed to send a person into space and then into orbit. The selection of the first astronauts, known as the "Original Seven" or "Mercury Seven", was announced on April 9, 1959.

By 1961, NASA was confident that Project Mercury had overcome its initial setbacks, and that the United States had overtaken the Soviet Union as the most advanced nation in space technology. This confidence was shattered on April 12, 1961, when the Soviet Union launched Vostok 1, and cosmonaut Yuri Gagarin became the first person to orbit the Earth. In response, President John F. Kennedy announced a far more ambitious goal on May 25, 1961: to put a man on the Moon by the end of the decade. This already had a name: Project Apollo. On April 18, 1962, NASA formally announced that it was accepting applications for a second group of astronauts who would assist the Mercury astronauts with Project Mercury, and join them in flying two-person Project Gemini missions. Nine candidates, known as the "Next Nine", were selected, and their names were publicly announced on September 17, 1962.

By May 1963, while there were enough astronauts for the needs of Project Gemini, the schedule for Project Apollo called for four crewed Earth-orbit missions launched by Saturn I rockets in 1965; between two and four launched by Saturn IB rockets in 1966; and six or more Earth-orbit and lunar-orbit missions launched by Saturn V rockets, commencing in 1967. On that schedule, the NASA Chief of the Astronaut Office, Mercury Seven astronaut Deke Slayton, could foresee a shortage of astronauts, although he doubted so many flights would actually be flown. By mid-1963, three Mercury Seven astronauts—Scott Carpenter (who was injured), John Glenn (who was retiring), and himself (an atrial fibrillation) —were no longer flying, so this left thirteen active astronauts. On that basis, he calculated an attrition rate of about ten percent per year. As the Apollo spacecraft had a crew of three and each mission required a prime and a backup crew, four missions per year would need 4 x 2 x 3 = 24 astronauts. On June 5, 1963, NASA announced that it would be recruiting another ten to fifteen new astronauts. Civilian applications had to be submitted by July 1, 1963; military ones were due by July 15, to give the services time to pre-screen their applicants.

== Selection criteria ==
Most of the criteria were unchanged from the previous selection, of the Next Nine: candidates had to be U.S. citizens, 6 feet (1.8 m) or less in height, with a degree in engineering or the physical or biological sciences, and recommended by their employer. There were two differences: the test-pilot qualification, while still preferred, was no longer a prerequisite, with 1,000 hours of jet-aircraft pilot time accepted as a substitute, and the maximum age was lowered by one year, so candidates had to be aged less than 34 on June 30, 1963.

== Selection process ==
A selection panel was established, consisting of Mercury Seven astronauts Deke Slayton, Alan Shepard, Wally Schirra and John Glenn, and NASA test pilot Warren J. North, the chief of Flight Crew Operations. By the final July 15 deadline, 720 applications were received, of which 492 were from military personnel and 228 were from civilians. Of these, 490 were considered eligible, and 136 were selected for further screening. The selection panel considered the applications between July 17 and 20, and picked the top 34.

The 34 selected for further examination were sent to Brooks Air Force Base for medical examinations between July 31 and August 15. The physical examinations were less invasive that those of the Mercury Seven, which were conducted at a time when little was known about the performance of the human body in weightless conditions. David Scott later remarked that the candidates were relieved "not to be subjected to the indignities endured" by their predecessors in having "every bodily orifice probed and checked". Tests included cardiograms, running on treadmills, electrocephalograms, and blood sugar tests. Hypoxia tests were carried out to see how they reacted to a loss of oxygen, they were spun about in darkened rooms to test their resistance to motion sickness, and ice water was poured into one ear to test how the inner ears reacted to such an imbalance. Psychological tests included being given a blank sheet of white paper and asked what it depicted. Six candidates were eliminated on medical grounds.

The final stage of the selection process were interviews by the selection panel, which were conducted at the Manned Spacecraft Center (MSC) in Houston between September 2 and 7. Michael Collins was one of five finalists who had previously been among the 32 finalists during the 1962 selection process, the others being Alan Bean, Richard Gordon, William E. Ramsey and Jack Swigert. Collins felt that the interview was easier the second time around. The panellists were no longer strangers, the questions they asked were no longer unpredictable, and he had the benefit of having attended the United States Air Force (USAF) Aerospace Research Pilot School (ARPS). He recalled that "even Deke Slayton and Warren North seem to have mellowed a bit". Slayton had developed a points system for assessing the candidates. Ten points each were allocated to academics, pilot performance, and character and motivation, for a possible score of thirty points. Compared with the previous selection, there was a greater emphasis on academic credentials.

Slayton took thirteen names to a meeting chaired by the MSC director, Robert R. Gilruth. Maxime Faget, the director of engineering and development, had an objection: thirteen was an unlucky number. So Slayton added the next candidate, Walter Cunningham, to the list. The successful candidates received phone calls from Slayton; unsuccessful ones got calls from North or Jack G. Cairl from NASA public relations. Four of the unsuccessful finalists would later become NASA astronauts in NASA Astronaut Group 5 in 1966: Vance Brand, Ronald Evans, James Irwin and Jack Swigert. Another finalist, Michael Adams, would be posthumously awarded his astronaut wings for X-15 Flight 3-65-97 on November 15, 1967, in which he died. The official announcement of the astronaut selection was made at a press conference at the MSC in Houston on October 18, 1963. The new astronauts became known as "The Fourteen".

== Demographics ==
Seven of the Fourteen were from the USAF: Major Edwin "Buzz" Aldrin and Captains William Anders, Charles Bassett, Michael Collins, Donn Eisele, Theodore Freeman and David Scott. Four were from the United States Navy: Lieutenant Commander Richard Gordon and Lieutenants Alan Bean, Gene Cernan and Roger Chaffee. Captain Clifton Williams was from the United States Marine Corps. There were two civilians: Walter Cunningham, who was a captain in the Marine Corps Reserve; and Russell "Rusty" Schweickart, who was a captain in the Massachusetts Air National Guard. All were test pilots except Aldrin, Anders, Cernan, Chaffee, Cunningham and Schweickart. "In retrospect", Collins noted, "we were in the same tradition as the previous two groups, despite the press's natural tendency to highlight differences."

At the time of selection, all were married except for Williams, who became the first bachelor astronaut. All the rest had children, except Cunningham. The number of children ranged from one (Cernan and Freeman) to six (Gordon); the average number of children was 2.75. Their average age of the group at the time of selection was 31, compared with 34.5 for the Mercury Seven and 32.5 for the Next Nine. They were slightly taller, at an average of 70.1 inches (178 cm), compared with 69.79 inches (177.3 cm) for the Seven and 69.94 inches (177.6 cm) for the Nine. Their average weight was higher too: 162 pounds (73.5 kg) compared to 159 pounds (72.1 kg) for the Seven and 161.5 pounds (73.3 kg) for the Nine. Flying time was lower; whereas the Seven had averaged 3,500 hours, of which 1,700 was in jets, and the Nine had averaged 2,800 hours with 1,900 in jets, the Fourteen had an average of 2,300 hours, with 1,800 in jets. Educational achievement was a major differentiator. While six of the Nine had bachelor's degrees and three had master's degrees, seven of the Fourteen had master's and three of them were working on one. Cunningham was working on his doctorate, and Aldrin had a Doctor of Science degree from the Massachusetts Institute of Technology.

Like the two groups before them, all were male and white. Jerrie Cobb, a pilot with a string of distance and altitude records to her credit who had passed the physical tests given to the Mercury Seven astronauts as one of the Mercury 13, put in an application, but it was rejected because it was filed on July 12, eleven days after the July 1 deadline. Two other women did file applications before the cutoff date and were included among the pool of applicants, but were not selected as finalists. President John F. Kennedy was disturbed at lingering racial discrimination against African Americans, and in 1962 he brought pressure to bear on the Chief of Staff of the United States Air Force, General Curtis LeMay, to nominate an African-American astronaut candidate. The USAF selected Captain Ed Dwight, a pilot with 2,000 hours in high-performance jets, an aeronautical engineering degree from Arizona State University, and outstanding performance reviews, for training at the USAF Test Pilot School. Dwight graduated with Class 62-C in April 1963. Dwight then applied for the ARPS, and Robert F. Kennedy told LeMay to ensure that he was accepted. The commandant, Colonel Chuck Yeager, protested, saying that there were other pilots that had been rated higher than Dwight. All were accepted, so Class IV had sixteen members instead of the usual eight. Dwight was ranked eighth in his class. Along with the seven ahead of him, he was recommended by the USAF for NASA astronaut training without qualification in July 1963. Dwight was not one of the 34 finalists, although the seven classmates, Michael Adams, Tommy Bell, Theodore Freeman, James Irwin, Alexander Rupp, David Scott and Kenneth Wier, were.

== Group members ==
Group members
Astronaut	Born	Died	Mission(s)	Career	Ref.
Edwin "Buzz" Aldrin	Glen Ridge, New Jersey, January 20, 1930			Aldrin graduated third in his class at the United States Military Academy at West Point, New York with a Bachelor of Science degree in mechanical engineering in 1951. He was commissioned in the United States Air Force, and served as a jet-fighter pilot during the Korean War. He flew 66 combat missions and shot down two MiG-15 aircraft. He earned a Doctor of Science degree in astronautics from the Massachusetts Institute of Technology in 1963, writing his thesis on Line-of-Sight Guidance Techniques for Manned Orbital Rendezvous. He was backup pilot for Gemini 9 and the pilot of Gemini 12 in 1966. After serving as backup command module pilot for Apollo 8, he was the lunar module pilot of Apollo 11, and the second person to set foot on the Moon. Upon leaving NASA in 1971, he became commandant of the USAF Test Pilot School. He retired from the Air Force in 1972.	
William Anders	Hong Kong, October 17, 1933	June 7, 2024		Anders graduated with a Bachelor of Science degree in electrical engineering from the United States Naval Academy in 1955, and chose to be commissioned in the USAF. He received a Master of Science degree in nuclear engineering from the Air Force Institute of Technology in 1962. As lunar module pilot of Apollo 8 in December 1968, the first crewed circumlunar flight, Anders was responsible for much of the photography, including the Earthrise photographs. He also served as backup pilot for Gemini 11 and backup command module pilot for Apollo 11. Upon leaving the astronaut corps, Anders later served as executive secretary of the National Aeronautics and Space Council from 1969 to 1973, a member of the Atomic Energy Commission from 1973 to 1975, the first chairman of the Nuclear Regulatory Commission, and United States Ambassador to Norway.	
Charles Bassett	Dayton, Ohio, December 30, 1931	February 28, 1966	None (Died before flight)	Bassett attended Ohio State University in Columbus from 1950 to 1952. Midway through college in 1952, Bassett enrolled in Air Force ROTC but entered the U.S. Air Force as an aviation cadet in October of that year. He earned a Bachelor of Science degree with honors in electrical engineering from Texas Technological College in 1960, and did graduate work at University of Southern California in Los Angeles. Bassett also graduated from the USAF Experimental Test Pilot School (Class 62A) and the ARPS (Class III). He was selected as pilot for Gemini 9, but died in a T-38 plane crash less than four months before the mission.	
Alan Bean	Wheeler, Texas, March 15, 1932	May 26, 2018		Bean received a Bachelor of Science degree in aeronautical engineering from the University of Texas at Austin in 1955. He was commissioned an ensign through the Naval Reserve Officers Training Corps (NROTC) program, and attended the U.S. Naval Test Pilot School at NAS Patuxent River, Maryland. He served as backup command pilot for Gemini 10 and backup lunar module pilot for Apollo 9. As lunar module pilot of Apollo 12 in 1969, he became the fourth man to walk on the Moon. He was commander of Skylab 3 in 1973, and backup commander for the Apollo–Soyuz Test Project in 1975. He retired from the Navy in October 1975, but continued as head of the Astronaut Candidate Operations and Training Group within the Astronaut Office as a civilian. He retired from NASA in 1981.	
Gene Cernan	Chicago, Illinois, March 14, 1934	January 16, 2017	Gemini 9A	Cernan studied at Purdue University where he received a Bachelor of Science degree in electrical engineering in 1956. He was commissioned in the Navy through the NROTC program. He earned a Master of Science degree in aeronautical engineering at the U.S. Naval Postgraduate School, Monterey, California in 1963. Cernan was backup pilot, and later prime pilot, for Gemini 9 in 1966, when he performed the second American EVA. He was the backup pilot for Gemini 12 and the backup lunar module pilot for Apollo 7. In May 1969 he was the lunar module pilot on Apollo 10, the first lunar flight of the lunar module, and highest velocity achieved by a crewed vehicle. He was backup commander of Apollo 14, and then returned to the Moon as commander of Apollo 17, the final crewed lunar landing, and was the last person to walk on the Moon. He was one of only three men to have flown to the Moon twice. He retired from NASA and the Navy in 1976.	
Roger Chaffee	Grand Rapids, Michigan, February 15, 1935	January 27, 1967		Chaffee attended Illinois Institute of Technology and Purdue University, from which he earned a Bachelor of Science degree in aeronautical engineering in 1957. He was commissioned in the Navy under the NROTC program. In 1962, he commenced studies for a Master of Science degree in reliability engineering at the Air Force Institute of Technology at Wright-Patterson Air Force Base. He was slated to be pilot on the prime crew for the first crewed Apollo mission, but was killed in a cabin fire during a launch rehearsal.	
Michael Collins	Rome, Italy, October 31, 1930	April 28, 2021		Collins received a Bachelor of Science degree in military science from West Point, from which he graduated 185th in 1952, and was commissioned in the USAF. He graduated from the USAF Experimental Flight Test Pilot School (Class 60C) and the ARPS (Class III). In 1965, he served as backup pilot for Gemini 7, and then in 1966 was pilot of Gemini 10, the first mission to perform a double rendezvous, and during which he performed a pair of EVAs. He was on the Apollo 3 (later named Apollo 8) crew, but was removed for medical reasons months before launch. In 1969, he flew to the Moon as command module pilot of Apollo 11, the first Moon landing. He left NASA in January 1970, and became assistant secretary of State for Public Affairs, and then director of the National Air and Space Museum of the Smithsonian Institution in Washington, D.C.	
Walter Cunningham	Creston, Iowa, March 16, 1932	January 3, 2023		Cunningham enlisted in the Navy in 1951 and began his flight training in 1952. In 1953, he was commissioned as a second lieutenant in the United States Marine Corps (USMC), and flew 54 missions as a night-fighter pilot in the Korean War. He was a reservist from 1956 to 1975. Cunningham earned a Bachelor of Arts degree in physics in 1960, and a Master of Arts degree in physics the following year from the University of California at Los Angeles. He was working on his PhD when he was selected for astronaut training. He was selected as lunar module pilot in the prime crew for Apollo 2, and then the backup crew for Apollo 1. He flew in space in October 1968 as lunar module pilot of Apollo 7, the first crewed Apollo mission. Cunningham then became chief of the Skylab branch of the Astronaut Office. He left NASA in 1971.	
Donn Eisele	Columbus, Ohio, June 23, 1930	December 2, 1987		Eisele graduated from the United States Naval Academy in 1952, and elected to join the USAF. He earned a Master of Science degree in astronautics in 1960 from the Air Force Institute of Technology at Wright-Patterson Air Force Base in Ohio. He graduated from the USAF Experimental Flight Test Pilot School (Class 62A) and the ARPS (Class IV). He flew in space in October 1968 as command module pilot of Apollo 7, the first crewed Apollo mission. He was also backup command module pilot for Apollo 10. In 1972, he retired from the Air Force and NASA to become director of the U.S. Peace Corps in Thailand.	
Theodore Freeman	Haverford, Pennsylvania, February 18, 1930	October 31, 1964	None (Died before flight)	Freeman attended the University of Delaware for one year, then entered the United States Naval Academy, from which he graduated in 1953 with a Bachelor of Science degree, and chose to join the USAF. In 1960, he received a Master of Science degree in aeronautical engineering from the University of Michigan. He graduated from both the USAF Experimental Test Pilot School (Class 62-A) and the ARPS (Class IV). He was killed in a T-38 crash in 1964 before being selected for any space flight assignment.	
Richard Gordon	Seattle, Washington, October 5, 1929	November 6, 2017		Gordon received a Bachelor of Science degree in chemistry from the University of Washington in 1951, and joined the Navy. He graduated from the Navy's All-Weather Flight School and, in 1957, from the Test Pilot School. He also studied at the U.S. Naval Postgraduate School. Gordon was the backup pilot for Gemini 8, and then, in September 1966, the pilot of Gemini 11. He was the backup command module pilot for Apollo 9 and then in November 1969 flew to the Moon as command module pilot of Apollo 12, the second crewed lunar landing. He was backup commander for Apollo 15, and was slated to command Apollo 18, but the mission was canceled due to budget cuts. He retired from NASA and the USN in January 1972 and accepted the position of executive vice president and general manager of the National Football League's New Orleans Saints.	
Russell "Rusty" Schweickart	Neptune, New Jersey, October 25, 1935			Schweickart received his Bachelor of Science degree from the Massachusetts Institute of Technology (MIT) in 1956, and a Master of Science degree from there in 1963. He worked as a research scientist at the Experimental Astronomy Laboratory at MIT. He served as a fighter pilot in the U.S. Air Force and the Massachusetts Air National Guard from 1956 to 1963. He flew in space in March 1969 as lunar module pilot of Apollo 9, the first crewed flight of the lunar module, and was backup commander for Skylab 2. He left NASA in 1977 to join the staff of the Governor of California, Jerry Brown, and he served in the Governor's office as his assistant for science and technology. In 1979 Schweickart became commissioner of energy for the State of California.	
David Scott	San Antonio, Texas, June 6, 1932			Scott received a Bachelor of Science degree in military science from West Point, from which he graduated fifth in the class of 1954, and was commissioned in the USAF. He received both a Master of Science degree in aeronautics/astronautics and the degree of Engineer in Aeronautics/Astronautics from MIT in 1962. He graduated from both the USAF Experimental Test Pilot School (Class 62-A) and the ARPS (Class IV). Scott flew in space as pilot of Gemini 8 in March 1966, a mission that featured the first docking in space (with an Agena target vehicle) and the first mission abort from Earth orbit. In March 1969 he was command module pilot of Apollo 9, the first crewed flight with a lunar module. He was backup commander of Apollo 12, and then, in July 1971, commander of Apollo 15, the fourth crewed lunar landing, and the first to use the Lunar Roving Vehicle. Scott became the seventh person to walk on the Moon. He served as backup commander of Apollo 17, but was removed due to the Apollo 15 postal covers incident. He retired from the Air Force in March 1975. He was deputy director of NASA's Dryden Flight Research Center, and then director until 1977.	
Clifton Williams	Mobile, Alabama, September 26, 1932	October 5, 1967	None (Died before flight)	Williams attended Spring Hill College from 1949 to 1951, and then transferred to Auburn University from which he received a Bachelor of Science degree in mechanical engineering in 1954. He joined the Marine Corps, and graduated from the U.S. Naval Test Pilot School at NAS Patuxent River, Maryland, in 1961. He served as backup pilot for Gemini 10, and was selected as a member of the backup crew for Apollo 9, but died in a T-38 crash before the mission.	

== Training and activities ==
The Fourteen were given classroom instruction, which Collins felt was useful "to bridge the gap between aeronautics and astronautics, to minimize the technological shock we might otherwise experience". The 240-hour course covered astronomy (15 hours), aerodynamics (8 hours), computers (36 hours), communications (8 hours), geology (58 hours), space medicine (12 hours), meteorology (5 hours), upper atmospheric physics (12 hours), navigation (34 hours), orbital mechanics (40 hours) and rockets (12 hours). The geology classes were a special case, as they were for all astronauts, not just the Fourteen. In addition to the classroom work, the training in geology included field trips to the Grand Canyon and Meteor Crater in Arizona, Philmont Scout Ranch in New Mexico, Horse Lava Tube System in Bend, Oregon, and the ash flow in the Marathon Uplift in Texas. There was also jungle survival training for the Fourteen in Panama, and desert survival training around Reno, Nevada. Water survival training was conducted at Naval Air Station Pensacola in Florida using the Dilbert Dunker.

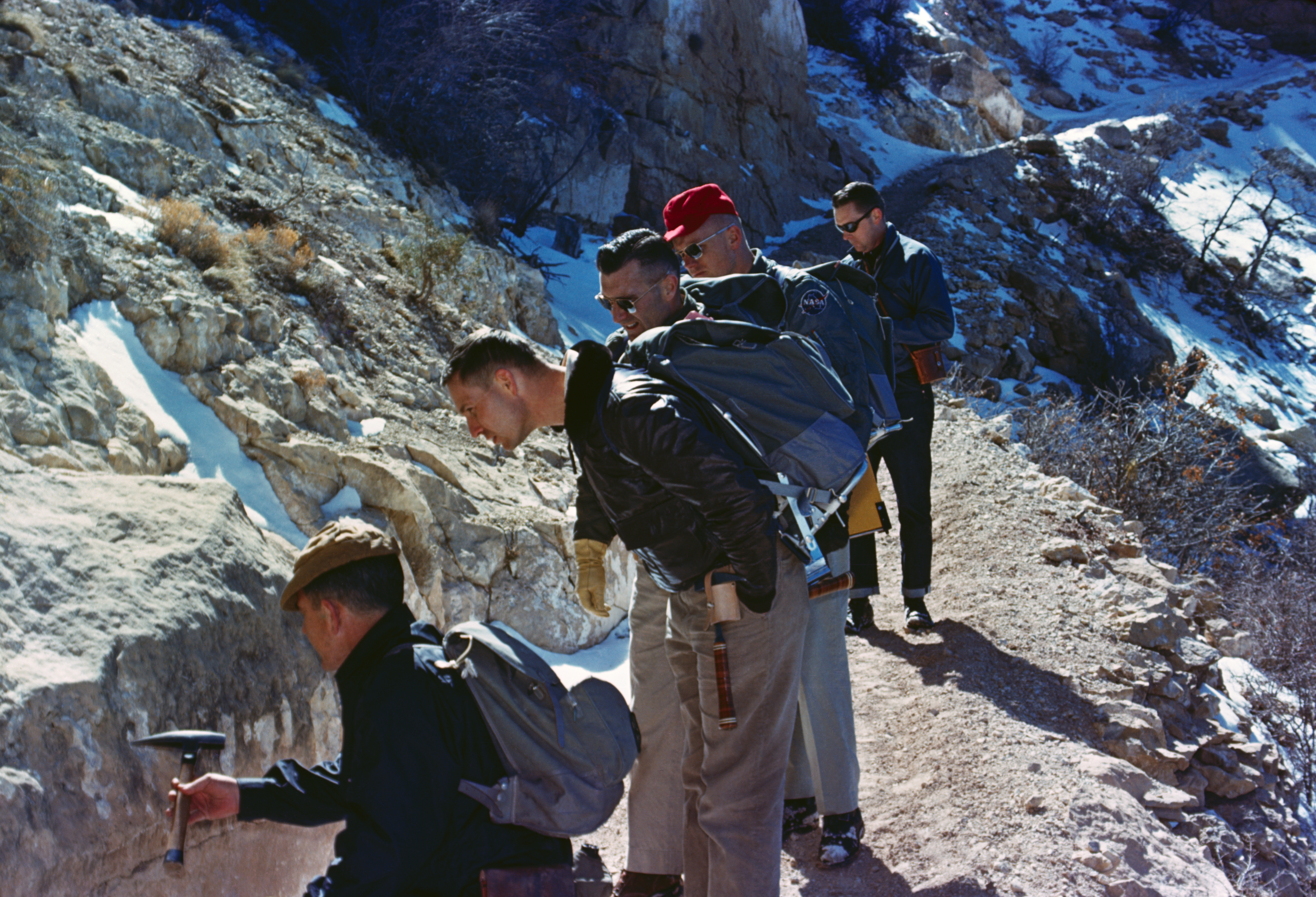
U.S. Survey Geologist E. Dale Jackson (left), with astronauts (left to right) Bill Anders, Richard Gordon, Neil Armstrong and Donn Eisele during geological training in the Grand Canyon, Arizona.

As the Mercury Seven and the Next Nine had done, each of the Fourteen was given an individual area in which to develop expertise that could be shared with the others, and to provide astronaut input to designers and engineers. Aldrin was given mission planning; Anders, environment controls; Bassett, training and simulators; Bean, recovery systems; Cernan, spacecraft propulsion and the Agena target vehicle; Chaffee, communications; Collins, pressure suits and extravehicular activity; Cunningham, non-flight experiments; Eisele, attitude controls; Freeman, boosters; Gordon, cockpit controls; Schweickart, in-flight experiments; Scott, guidance and navigation; and Williams, range operations and crew safety.

The Fourteen were divided between two branches. The Apollo branch, which was concerned with Project Apollo, was headed by Mercury Seven astronaut Gordon Cooper. It included Pete Conrad from the Next Nine, and Anders, Cernan, Chaffee, Cunningham, Eisele, Freeman, Gordon and Schweickart from the Fourteen. The operations branch, which was concerned with Project Gemini, was headed by Next Nine astronaut Neil Armstrong. Assigned to it were Elliot See from the Next Nine, and Aldrin, Bassett, Bean, Collins, Scott and Williams from the Fourteen.

The Fourteen suffered a high death rate. Bassett, Freeman and Williams were killed in T-38 crashes, and Chaffee in the Apollo 1 fire, before they had a chance to fly in space. All the rest flew at least once; Aldrin, Bean, Collins and Gordon flew twice, and Cernan and Scott flew three times. Aldrin, Anders, Bean, Cernan, Collins, Gordon and Scott flew to the Moon (Cernan twice), and Aldrin, Bean, Cernan and Scott walked on it. Three other finalists also died in aircraft accidents: Rupp on June 11, 1965, Adams on November 15, 1967, and Darrell Cornell on October 10, 1984. (Note: In addition to these deaths in training accidents, finalist John Yamnicky was a passenger on American Airlines Flight 77 and was killed when it crashed into the Pentagon during the September 11 attacks.)
