= Theodore Freeman =

American engineer and astronaut (1930–1964)

Ted Freeman
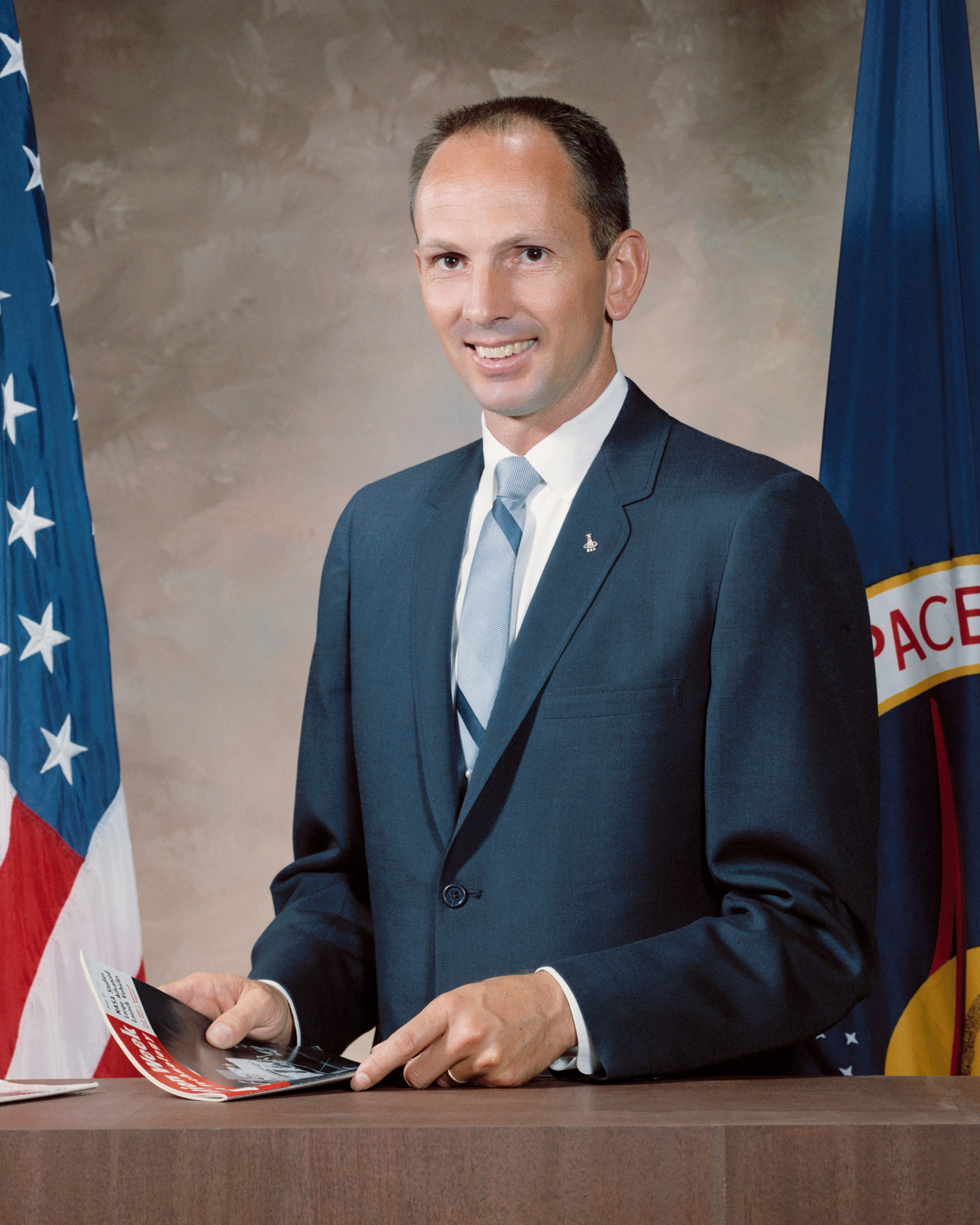
- Born: Theodore Cordy Freeman; February 18, 1930; Haverford, Pennsylvania, U.S.
- Died: October 31, 1964 (aged 34); Houston, Texas, U.S.
- Resting place: Arlington National Cemetery
- Education: University of Delaware; United States Naval Academy (BS); University of Michigan (MS)
- Space career

NASA astronaut
- Rank: Captain, USAF
- Selection: NASA Group 3 (1963)

Theodore Cordy Freeman (February 18, 1930 – October 31, 1964) was an American aeronautical engineer, U.S. Air Force officer, test pilot, and NASA astronaut. Selected in the third group of NASA astronauts in 1963, he was killed a year later in the crash of a T-38 jet, marking the first fatality among the NASA Astronaut Corps. At the time of his death, he held the rank of captain.

== Early life ==
Born in Haverford, Pennsylvania, on February 18, 1930, Freeman was named after the man who raised his father (Theodore Cullen Donovan), as well as his maternal grandfather (Thomas Cordy Wilson). He was one of five children. Raised in Lewes, Delaware, he attended Lewes Elementary School from 1936 to 1944. His father was a farmer and his brother a carpenter, and it seemed as if he would also have a blue collar career. When Freeman and his brother were young, they saved up money so they could take plane rides. He also was a part-time worker, helping to refuel the planes and work on them. He spent most of his money on flying lessons, and with over 450 hours of flying on his training record, earned his pilot's license by the age of 16. "I sort of grew up at the airport," Freeman said.

Freeman played baseball and football in high school. While playing football, he was hit hard and his teeth were knocked out of alignment. He was the president of the school's student and the local chapter of the National Honor Society; he graduated as an honors student ranked third in his class in 1948.

He was a Boy Scout and he earned the rank of First Class.

== Education ==
During his senior year of high school, Freeman completed the application to the United States Naval Academy. He passed the scholarship portion, but failed the medical portion due to his crooked teeth. He was told if he straightened them out he would be accepted the next year.

During that year, Freeman attended the University of Delaware at Newark to further his education. He also made some money by spotting schools of fish for local fishermen. Freeman had an operation to fix his teeth, which included grinding his teeth down, then wore braces for several months to finish the effort. He was admitted to the U.S. Naval Academy Class of 1953 on June 17, 1949. Freeman graduated from Annapolis in 1953 with a Bachelor of Science degree. In 1960, he received a Master of Science degree in aeronautical engineering from the University of Michigan.

== Military and NASA career ==
"We don't look on this as dangerous work. It's about the most fascinating job I could imagine."

— Freeman, about his astronaut duties.

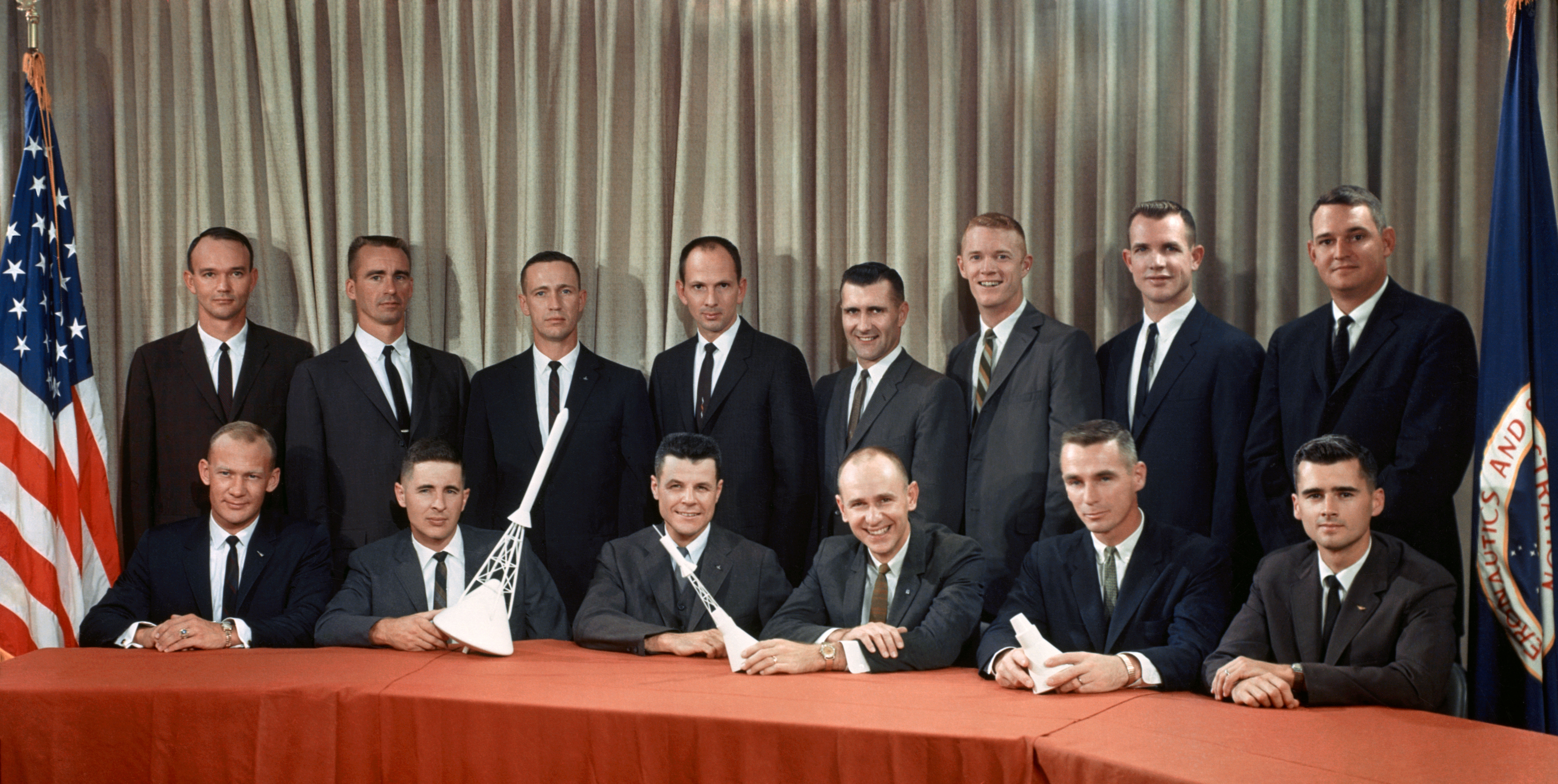
Freeman (standing, fourth from left), with fellow "The Fourteen" astronauts

Freeman elected to enter the U.S. Air Force and took flight training at Hondo Air Force Base and Bryan Air Force Base, Texas and at Nellis Air Force Base, Nevada. He was awarded his pilot wings in February 1955, shortly after being promoted to first lieutenant, then served in the Pacific and at George Air Force Base, California. He was promoted to captain in June 1960 while pursuing his master's degree at the University of Michigan and then went to Edwards Air Force Base, California, in February 1960 as an aerospace engineer.

Freeman graduated from both the Air Force's Experimental Flight Test Pilot School (Class 62A) and Aerospace Research Pilot School (Class IV) courses. He elected to serve with the Air Force. His last Air Force assignment was as a flight test aeronautical engineer and experimental flight test instructor at the ARPS at Edwards AFB in the Mojave Desert.

Freeman served primarily in performance flight testing and stability testing areas; he logged more than 3,300 hours flying time, including more than 2,400 hours in jet aircraft. Freeman was one of the third group of astronauts selected by NASA in October 1963 and was assigned the responsibility of aiding the development of boosters.

== Death ==
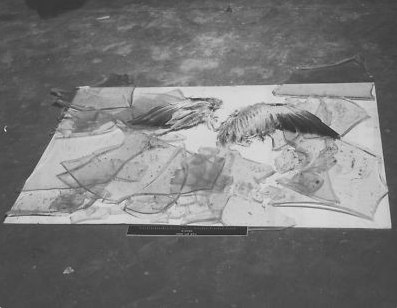
Goose wings lie alongside fragments of Freeman's T-38 canopy.

Freeman died in a plane crash due to a bird strike on the morning of October 31, 1964. After a delay caused by fog, he piloted a T-38A Talon from St. Louis to Houston. Freeman was returning on Saturday from McDonnell training facilities in St. Louis and crashed during final approach to landing at Ellington Air Force Base in Houston. There were reports of geese due to the fog, one of which flew into the port-side air intake of his NASA-modified T-38 jet trainer, causing the engine to flame out. Flying shards of Plexiglas entered the jet engine during the crash.

Freeman attempted to land on the runway, but realized he was too short and might hit military housing. He banked away from the runway and ejected. The jet had nosed down a considerable amount, and he ejected nearly horizontally. Freeman's parachute did not deploy in time, and he died upon impact with the ground; his skull was fractured and he had severe chest injuries.

== Personal life ==
Freeman was married with one daughter. His wife first heard of her husband's death when a Houston reporter, Jim Schefter, arrived at her house; NASA subsequently ensured that in the case of future astronaut deaths, the families would be informed by other astronauts as quickly as possible. Freeman was buried with full military honors in Arlington National Cemetery. Five astronauts were pallbearers at the funeral.

== Honors ==
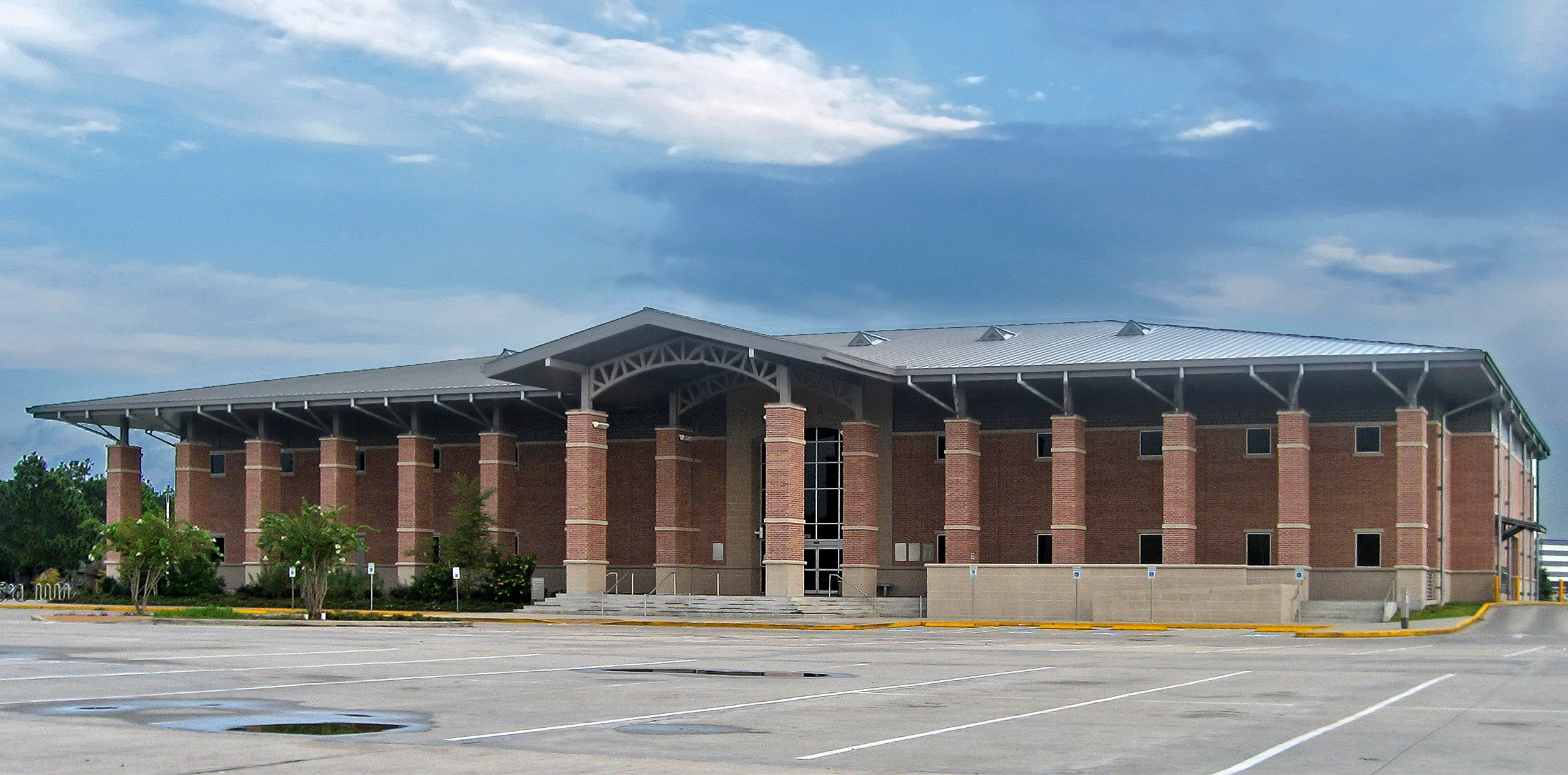
Freeman Public Library in Clear Lake City

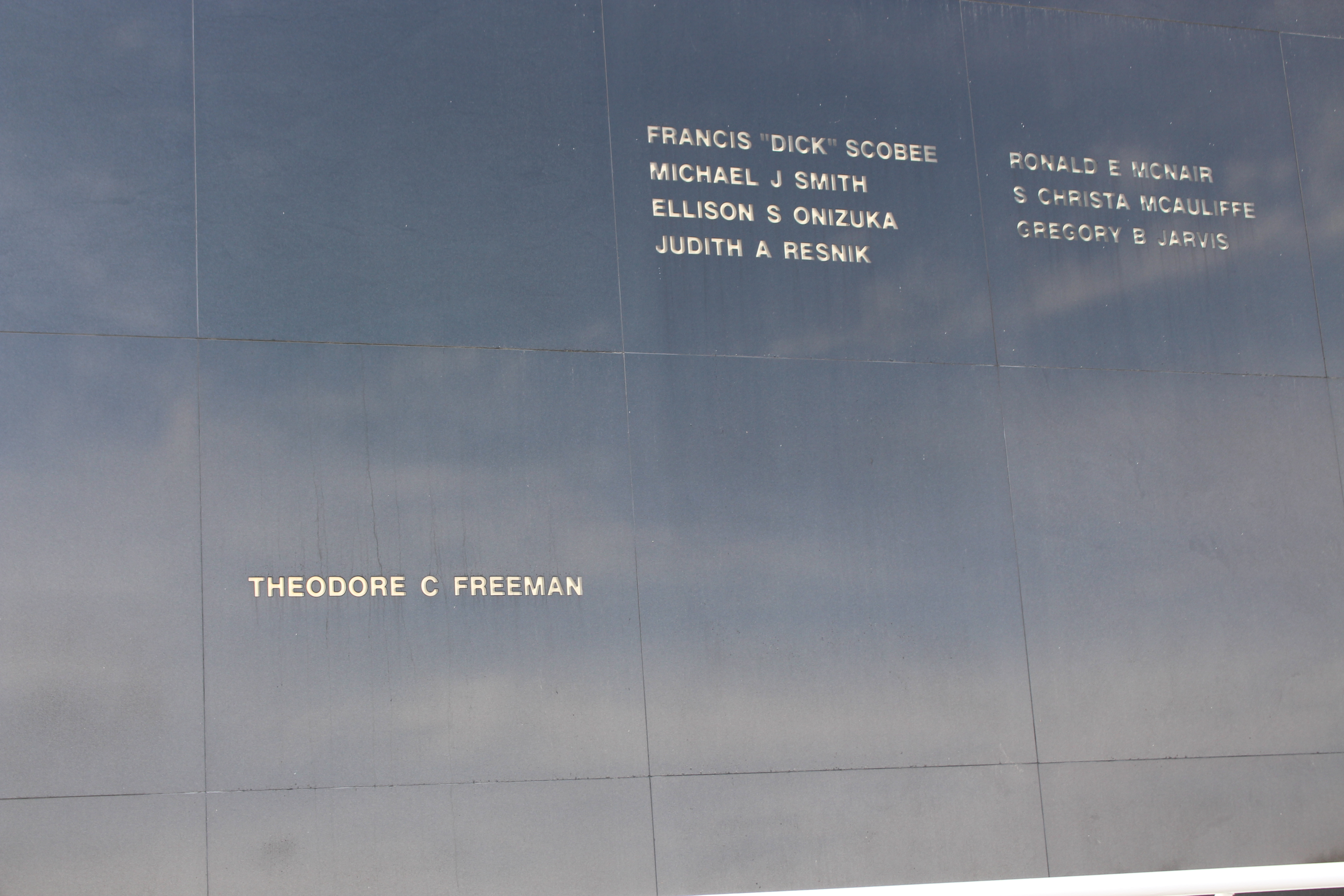
Freeman on the Space Mirror Memorial

The Clear Lake City-County Freeman Branch Library of the Harris County Public Library and Houston Public Library systems is named in memory of Freeman. An artificial island off Long Beach is also named for him. This is one of the four "Astronaut Islands" built in Long Beach Harbor during the late 1960s as unsinkable platforms for oil drilling; the others were named Grissom, White and Chaffee, in honor of the astronauts killed in the Apollo 1 fire. A crater on the far side of the Moon was temporarily named Freeman crater by the Apollo 8 crew. The Theodore C. Freeman Highway in Lewes, Delaware, an approach road to the Cape May–Lewes Ferry which carries U.S. Route 9, was named after him by a resolution of the Delaware Senate on December 21, 1965. A plaque commemorating Freeman was unveiled at the Lewes terminal of the Cape May–Lewes Ferry on June 18, 2014, with Governor Jack Markell and family members of Freeman in attendance at the ceremony.

== Books ==
Oriana Fallaci's 1965 book about the early days of the American space program, If the Sun Dies, features an account of Freeman.

== See also ==
- Fallen Astronaut sculpture
- List of spaceflight-related accidents and incidents

== Bibliography ==
- Burgess, Colin; Doolan, Kate; Vis, Bert (2008). Fallen Astronauts: Heroes Who Died Reaching the Moon. Lincoln, Nebraska: University of Nebraska. ISBN 978-0-8032-1332-6.
- Collins, Michael (2001) [1974]. Carrying the Fire: An Astronaut's Journeys. New York: Cooper Square Press. ISBN 978-0-8154-1028-7. OCLC 45755963.
