= Oklahoma City (disambiguation) =

Oklahoma City is the capital and largest city of the U.S. state of Oklahoma.

Oklahoma City may also refer to:

- Oklahoma City metropolitan area
  - Downtown Oklahoma City
  - Uptown Oklahoma City
- Oklahoma City University
- USS Oklahoma City, the name of two U.S. Navy vessels
- "Oklahoma City", a song by Zach Bryan from American Heartbreak, 2022

== See also ==
- List of cities and towns in Oklahoma
- Oklahoma (disambiguation)
- OKC (disambiguation)
- OC (disambiguation)
