= William Pogue =

American astronaut (1930–2014)

Bill Pogue
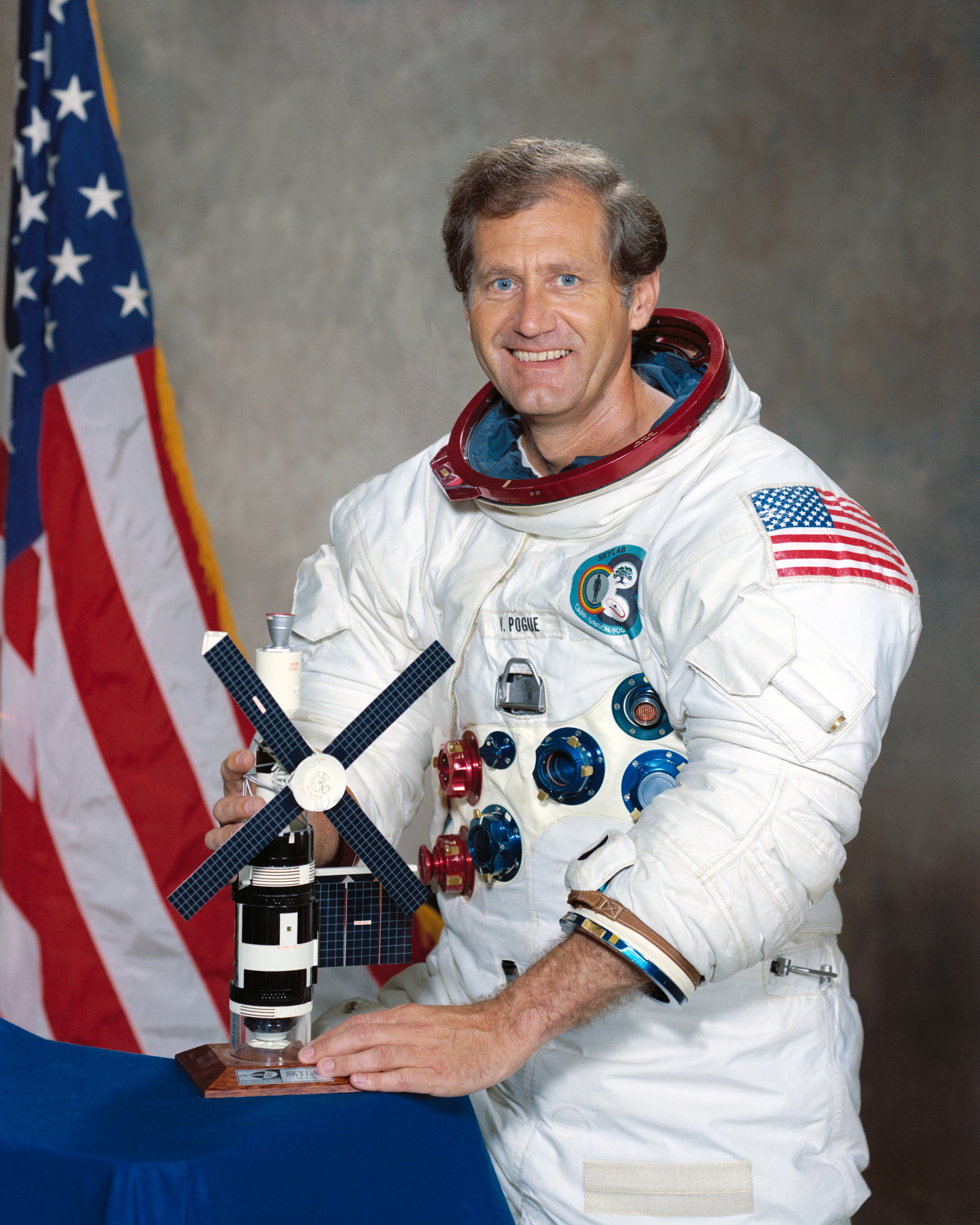
- Pogue in August 1975
- Born: William Reid Pogue; January 23, 1930; Okemah, Oklahoma, U.S.
- Died: March 3, 2014 (aged 84); Cocoa Beach, Florida, U.S.
- Education: Oklahoma Baptist University (BS); Oklahoma State University, Stillwater (MS)
- Spouse(s): Helen Juanita Dittmar (m. 1952, divorced) Jean Ann Baird (m. 1979; died 2009) Tina Pogue (m. 2012)
- Children: 3
- Awards: NASA Distinguished Service Medal; Air Medal
- Space career

NASA astronaut
- Rank: Colonel, USAF
- Time in space: 84d 1h 15m
- Selection: NASA Group 5 (1966)
- Total EVAs: 2
- Total EVA time: 13h 34m
- Missions: Skylab 4
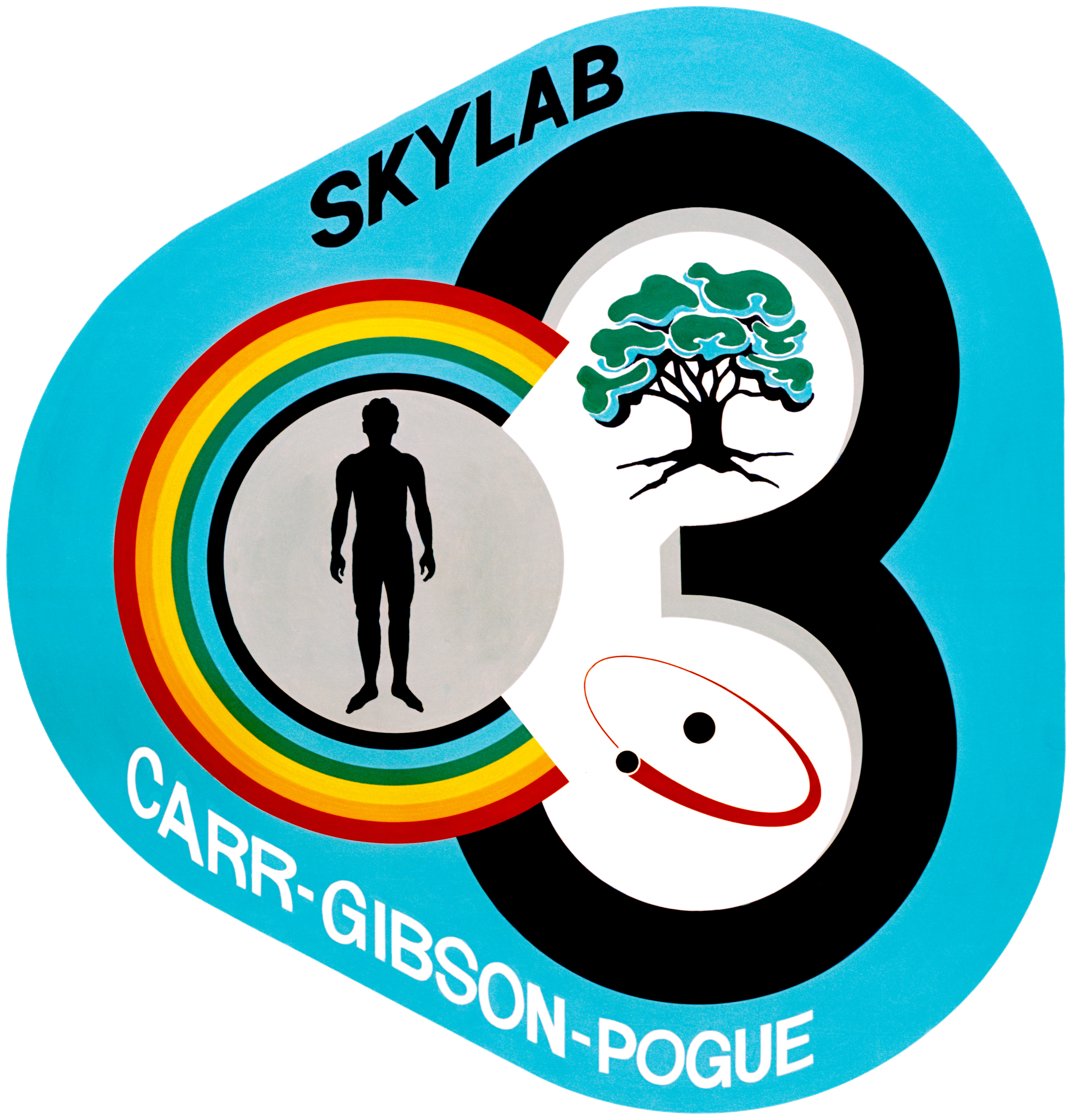
- Mission insignia
- Retired: September 1, 1975

Signature
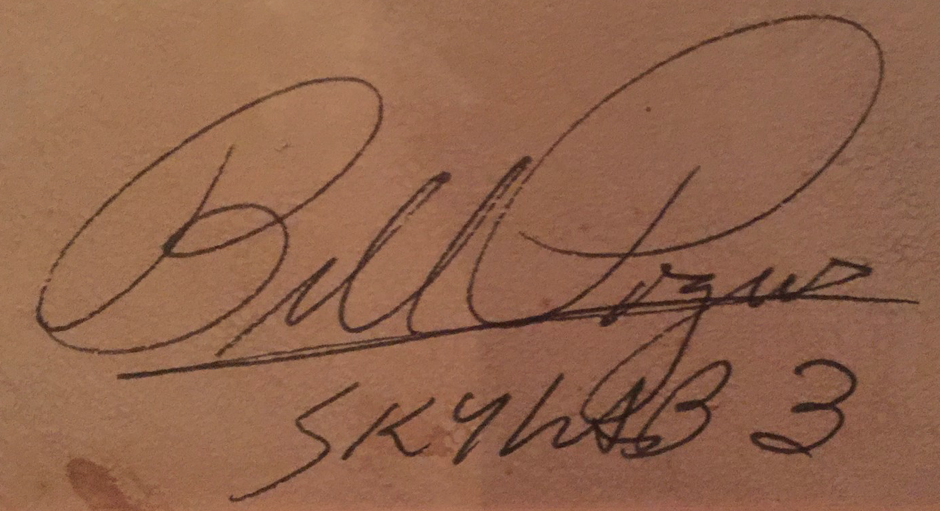

William Reid Pogue (January 23, 1930 – March 3, 2014) was an American astronaut and pilot who served in the United States Air Force (USAF) as a fighter pilot and test pilot, and reached the rank of colonel. He was also a teacher, public speaker and author.

Born and educated in Oklahoma, Pogue graduated from Oklahoma Baptist University with a Bachelor of Science degree in Education and enlisted in the USAF in 1951 and served for 24 years. He flew combat during the Korean War and with the USAF Thunderbirds, then served as a flight instructor. Following graduation from Oklahoma State University with a Master of Science degree in 1960, he served as mathematics professor at the United States Air Force Academy, and after training at the Empire Test Pilots' School, he was a test pilot whose service included a two-years exchange with the Royal Air Force (RAF).

During his service as a flight instructor, Pogue was accepted as a trainee astronaut for NASA in 1966. His NASA career included one orbital mission as pilot of Skylab 4, whose crew conducted dozens of in-orbit research experiments and set a duration record of 84 days—the longest crewed flight—that was unbroken in NASA for over 20 years. The mission also had a dispute with ground control over schedule management that news media named The Skylab Mutiny. Pogue retired from the USAF and NASA a few months after he returned from Skylab, after which he taught and wrote about aviation and aeronautics in the U.S. and abroad. Pogue died in 2014, aged 84.

== Early life and education ==
William Pogue was born on January 23, 1930, in Okemah, Oklahoma, to Alex Wallis Pogue and Margaret Frances Pogue (née McDow) and he self-identifies as being of Choctaw descent. William had four siblings; two sisters and two brothers. Pogue attended Lake Elementary School and Sand Springs High School (now Charles Page High School) in Sand Springs, Oklahoma, completing his high-school education in 1947. He participated in the Boy Scouts of America, earning the rank of Second Class. Pogue attended Oklahoma Baptist University in Shawnee, Oklahoma, graduating with a Bachelor of Science degree in Education in 1951. In 1960, he graduated from Oklahoma State University in Stillwater, Oklahoma, with a Master of Science degree in Mathematics.

== Career ==
=== Flight experience ===
Pogue was attracted to flying from an early age; he first flew an airplane while in high school. Pogue enlisted in the United States Air Force (USAF) in 1951, underwent the aviation cadet training program in 1952. He was later commissioned into the USAF as a second lieutenant. While serving with the Fifth Air Force from 1953 to 1954 during the Korean War, he flew 43 combat missions in fighter bombers while completing a tour of duty. From 1955 to 1957, Pogue was a member of the USAF Thunderbirds as an aerobatics pilot.

Pogue piloted more than 50 types and models of American and British aircraft, and was qualified as a civilian flight instructor. Pogue served in the mathematics department as an assistant professor at the United States Air Force Academy in Colorado Springs, Colorado, from 1960 to 1963. He applied to become an astronaut in 1962, but was rejected due to a lack of pilot experience. In September 1965, Pogue completed a two-year tour as test pilot with the British Ministry of Aviation under an exchange program between the USAF and Royal Air Force and graduated from the Empire Test Pilots' School in Farnborough, England. He was an Air Force major at the time, and went to the Manned Spacecraft Center in Houston, Texas, from an assignment at Edwards Air Force Base, California, where he had been an instructor at the U.S. Air Force Aerospace Research Pilot School since October 1965.

=== NASA career ===
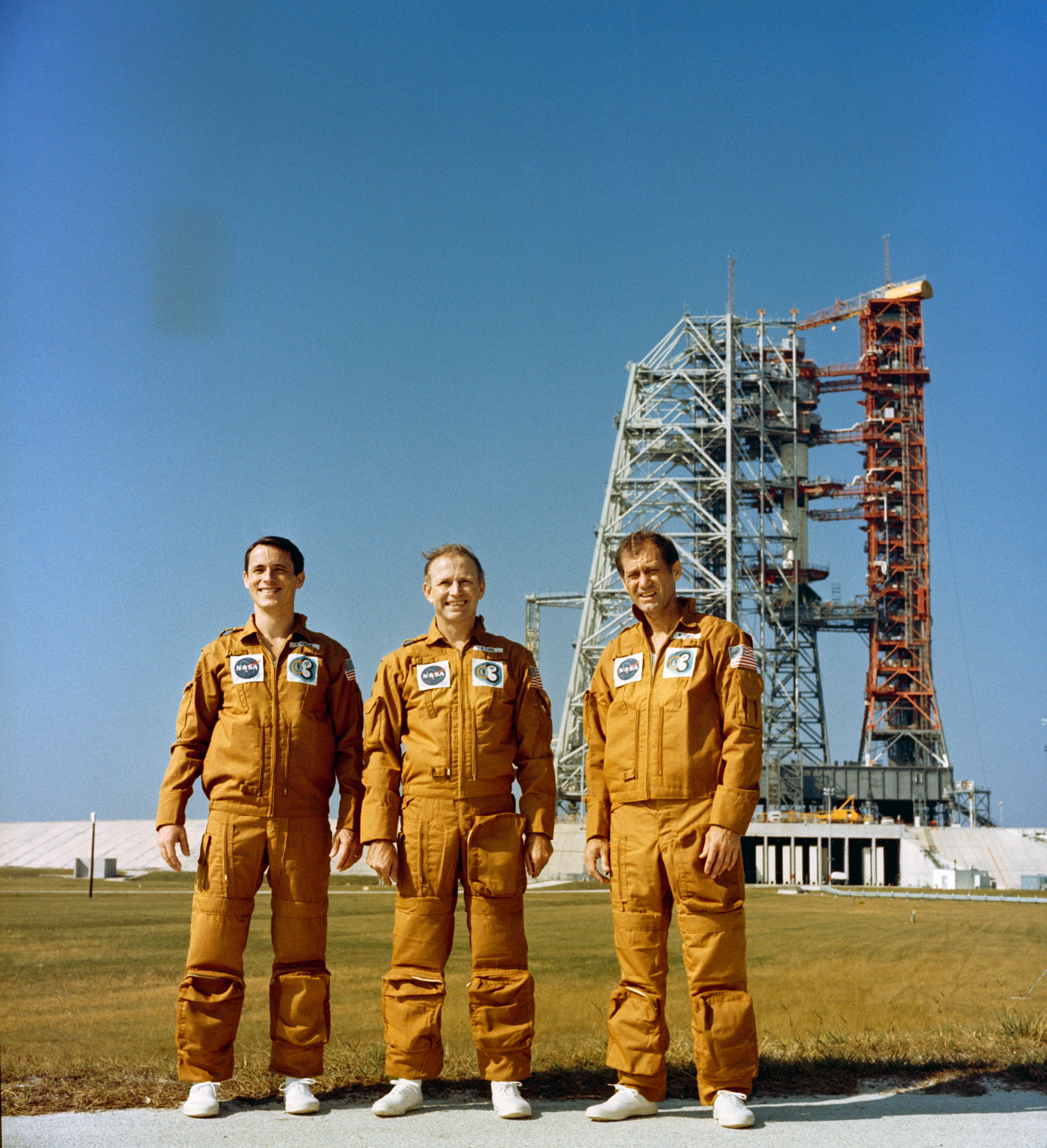
The Skylab 4 crew, from left: Gibson, Carr and Pogue

In April 1966, Pogue was one of 19 astronauts selected by NASA in Group 5 of the Apollo program. He served as a member of the support crews for the Apollo 7, Apollo 11, Apollo 13 (Note: Some sources list Kerwin and others list Pogue as a member of the Apollo 13 support crew.) and Apollo 14 missions. He replaced Ed Givens, who died in a car accident, as Capsule Communicator for Apollo 7. No crew members were assigned to the canceled Apollo missions but if normal crew rotation had been followed, Pogue would have been assigned as command module pilot for the Apollo 19 mission.

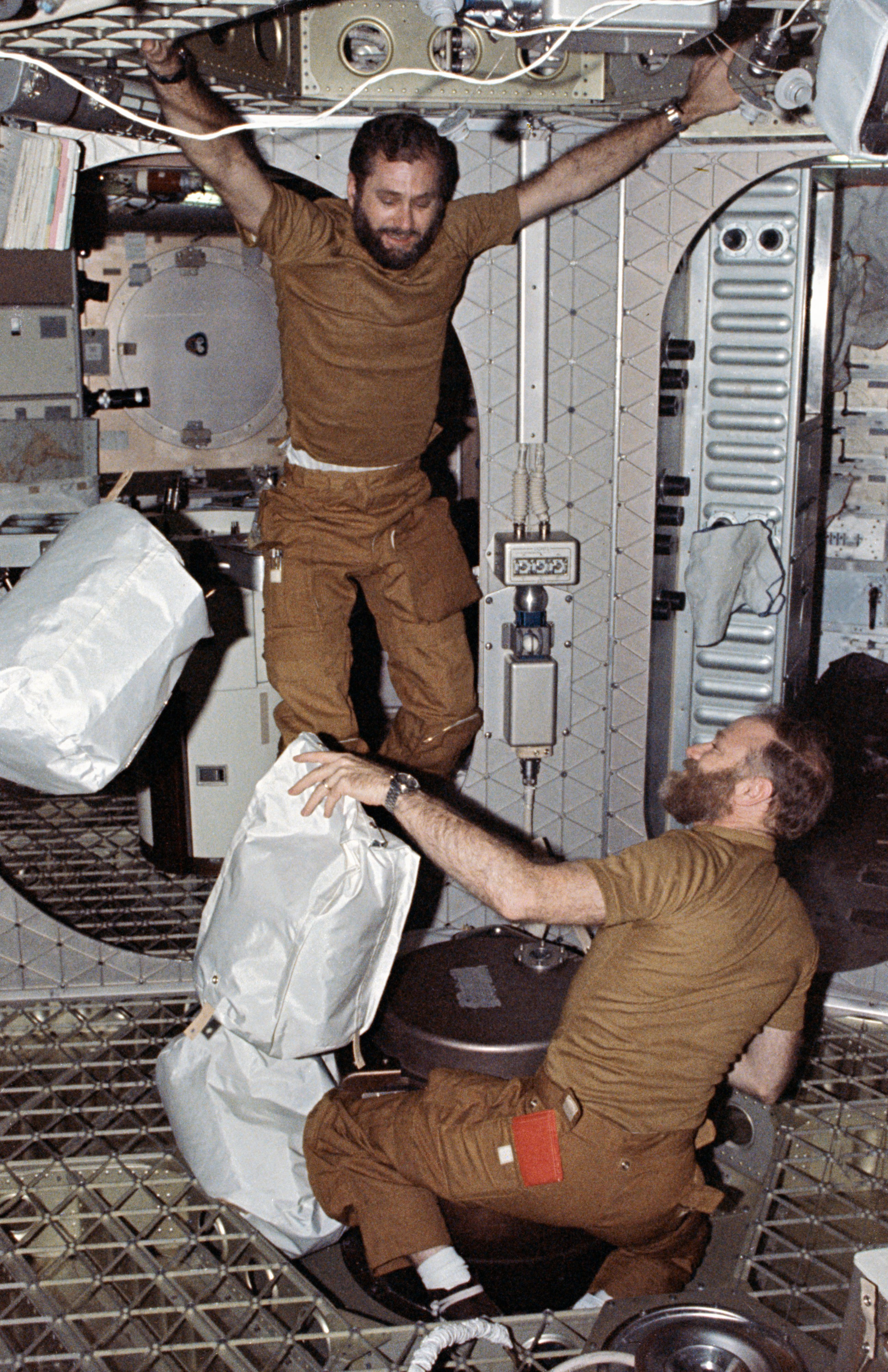
Pogue (left) and Gerald Carr disposing of trash bags aboard the Skylab 4

Pogue was the pilot of Skylab 4, the third and final crewed visit to the Skylab Orbital Workshop, from November 16, 1973, to February 8, 1974. At 84 days, 1 hour and 15 minutes, it was the longest crewed flight to that date. It held the record for the longest spaceflight until 1978, when the crew of Soviet ship Salyut 6 spent 140 days at the space station. Pogue was accompanied on the 34.5 million miles (55.5×10^{6} km) flight by Commander Gerald Carr and science pilot Edward Gibson. As a crew, they completed 56 experiments, 26 science demonstrations, 15 subsystem detailed objectives, and 13 student investigations across 1,214 revolutions of the Earth.

Pogue commented in 1985 that the flight had made him more empathetic, saying “I try to put myself into the human situation, instead of trying to operate like a machine.”

The crew also acquired extensive Earth resources observations data using Skylab's Earth resources experiment package camera and sensor array, and logged 338 hours of operations of the Apollo Telescope Mount that made extensive observations of the sun's processes. Pogue and Carr viewed a comet transiting the sky during an extravehicular activity (EVA). He logged 13 hours and 34 minutes in two EVAs outside the orbital workshop. On September 1, 1975, Pogue retired from the USAF, as a colonel, and NASA, to become vice president of High Flight Foundation. Pogue logged 7,200 hours of flight time, including 4,200 hours in jet aircraft and 2,000 hours in space flight during his career.

=== Post-NASA activities ===
After he retired from NASA, William Pogue was self-employed as an aerospace consultant and a producer of general-interest videos about space flight. In 1985, Pogue wrote a book called How Do You Go to the Bathroom in Space?, answering 187 common questions he received about spaceflight. In 1992, he co-wrote The Trikon Deception, a science-fiction novel, with Ben Bova. He also became a consultant for aircraft manufacturers including Boeing and Martin Marietta, helping to create space station technology. Pogue continuously presented lectures over a 40-year career, working at more than 500 schools and 100 civic clubs.

== Personal life ==
William Pogue married three times; his first marriage was in 1952 to Helen Juanita Dittmar, with whom he had three children. The couple later divorced. He married Jean Ann Baird in 1979 and the marriage lasted until Baird's death in 2009. Pogue's last marriage was to Tina, whom he wed in 2012.

=== Death ===
During the night of March 3, 2014, at the age of 84, Pogue died from natural causes at his home in Cocoa Beach, Florida. His ashes were sent into Earth orbit using Celestis, a memorial rocket service launch on a Falcon Heavy rocket on June 25, 2019. A plaque commemorating his life was erected at Sand Springs, Oklahoma.

== In popular culture ==
The 6139-6005 model Seiko watch which Pogue took on his Skylab mission as his personal watch is known to watch collectors as the "Pogue". It is of interest to collectors because it is the first automatic chronograph in space and unusual because NASA astronauts generally wore their NASA-issued Omega Speedmaster.

== Special honors ==
Pogue and his crew members received many awards. Pogue won the Johnson Space Center Superior Achievement Award in 1970. Three Skylab crews, including Pogue, were awarded the 1973 Robert J. Collier Trophy. In 1974, President Richard Nixon presented the Skylab 4 crew with the NASA Distinguished Service Medal, and the Fédération Aéronautique Internationale awarded the crew the De La Vaulx Medal and Vladimir Komarov Diploma that year. Pogue was among nine Skylab astronauts who were presented with the City of Chicago Gold Medal in 1974 after a parade with 150,000 spectators. The American Astronautical Society's 1975 Flight Achievement Award was awarded to the crew. Gerald P. Carr accepted the 1975 Dr. Robert H. Goddard Memorial Trophy from President Gerald Ford, which was awarded to the Skylab astronauts, who also won the AIAA Haley Astronautics Award in 1975.

William R. Pogue Municipal Airport (Note: FAA Code: OWP; ICAO Code: KOWP) in Sand Springs, Oklahoma, was named in Pogue's honor in 1974. The Oklahoma Aviation and Space Museum awarded him the Clarence E. Page Memorial Trophy for "making significant and ongoing contributions to the U.S. aviation industry" in February 1989. Page died eight days before the award was presented and Pogue used most of his speech to memorialize Page's life. Pogue was awarded an honorary doctorate of science from Oklahoma Baptist University in 1974. Pogue received the City of New York gold medal and the General Thomas D. White USAF Space Trophy for the same year.

Pogue has been inducted into three halls of fame. He was inducted into the Five Civilized Tribes Hall of Fame in 1975, and was one of five Oklahoman astronauts inducted into the Oklahoma Aviation and Space Hall of Fame in 1980. Pogue was one of 24 Apollo astronauts who were inducted into the U.S. Astronaut Hall of Fame in 1997. As a member of the USAF Thunderbirds, he won the Air Medal, Air Force Commendation Medal, the National Defense Service Medal, and an Air Force Outstanding Unit Award.

== Bibliography ==
- William Reid Pogue (1991). How Do You Go To The Bathroom In Space?: All the Answers to All the Questions You Have About Living in Space. New York: Tom Doherty Associates. ISBN 978-0-8125-1728-6.
- William Reid Pogue (1985). Astronaut primer. Tucson, Arizona: Libration Press. ISBN 978-0-935291-00-1.
- Ben Bova; William Reid Pogue. The Trikon Deception. ISBN 978-1-4332-2777-6.
- William Reid Pogue (2003). Space trivia. Ontario: Apogee Books. ISBN 978-1-896522-98-2.
- William Reid Pogue (March 2011). But for the Grace of God: An Autobiography of an Aviator and Astronaut (First ed.). Soar with Eagles. ISBN 978-0-9814756-5-3.

== See also ==
- List of spaceflight records
- The Astronaut Monument
