= Oklahoma (disambiguation) =

Oklahoma is a state in the South Central region of the United States.

Oklahoma may also refer to:

== Arts and entertainment ==
- Oklahoma!, a 1943 Rodgers and Hammerstein musical comedy
  - Oklahoma! (original Broadway cast recording), a 1943 album
  - Oklahoma! (film), a 1955 film based on the musical and starring Gordon MacRae and Shirley Jones
    - Oklahoma! (soundtrack), a 1955 album
  - "Oklahoma" (Rodgers and Hammerstein song), the musical's theme song and the state of Oklahoma's official song
  - Oklahoma! (1999 film), starring Hugh Jackman
- Oklahoma (Keb' Mo' album), 2019
- "Oklahoma" (Billy Gilman song), 2000
- "Oklahoma U.S.A.", a 1971 song by the Kinks
- An unused original title for the Butthole Surfers album “Electriclarryland”, 1996

== Places ==
- Oklahoma, Mississippi, U.S.
- Oklahoma, Pennsylvania, U.S.
- Oklahoma City, the capital of the state of Oklahoma, U.S.
- Oklahoma County, Oklahoma in central Oklahoma, U.S.
- Oklahoma Territory, an organized territory of the U.S. (1890–1907) that became part of the state

== Other uses ==
- 13688 Oklahoma, an asteroid
- Oklahoma City Thunder, an NBA team
- USS Oklahoma, the name of a U.S. Navy ship and a submarine
- SS Oklahoma (1908), tank steamer owned by the Gulf Refining Company, sunk in 1914
- University of Oklahoma, in Norman, Oklahoma, U.S.
- Oklahoma, wrestling ring name of Ed Ferrara

== See also ==
- Oklahoma City (disambiguation)
