= Science Museum Oklahoma =

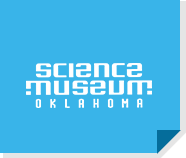
- Former name: The Omniplex Science Museum
- Location: Oklahoma City, Oklahoma
- Coordinates: 35.5236°N 97.4751°W
- Type: Science museum
- Accreditation: AAM Accredited Museum
- Visitors: 600,000+ (2023)
- Website: http://www.sciencemuseumok.org/

Science Museum Oklahoma is a science museum located in Oklahoma City, Oklahoma. The museum features several notable attractions, including the new Love's Planetarium, the International Gymnastics Hall of Fame, and various specialized galleries. With a facility spanning over 390,000 square feet, it ranks among the largest science museums in the nation. Originally established as the Kirkpatrick Planetarium in 1958, the museum underwent significant expansions in 1980, 1985, 2000, and 2007.

== History ==
The Science Museum Oklahoma, originally named the Kirkpatrick Planetarium, was established in 1958. It relocated to a permanent facility at the Oklahoma State Fairgrounds in 1962. Later that year, the Oklahoma Science and Arts Foundation facility was completed on the fairgrounds. In 1978, the foundation underwent a name change to Omniplex Science Museum. Subsequently, it relocated with the Kirkpatrick Planetarium to the newly constructed Kirkpatrick Center museum campus. Subsequent expansions to the museum complex include the addition of the Oklahoma Air and Space Museum in 1980, the establishment of the Kirkpatrick Gardens and Greenhouse in 1985, and the introduction of the OmniDome Theatre in 2000, which notably became Oklahoma's inaugural large-format, dome-screen theater. In 2007, Omniplex underwent a name change to Science Museum Oklahoma. Following the rebranding, the museum underwent significant remodeling efforts, introducing numerous new exhibits and galleries. These additions included a space exhibit designed to engage younger visitors and various art galleries.

== Notable exhibits ==
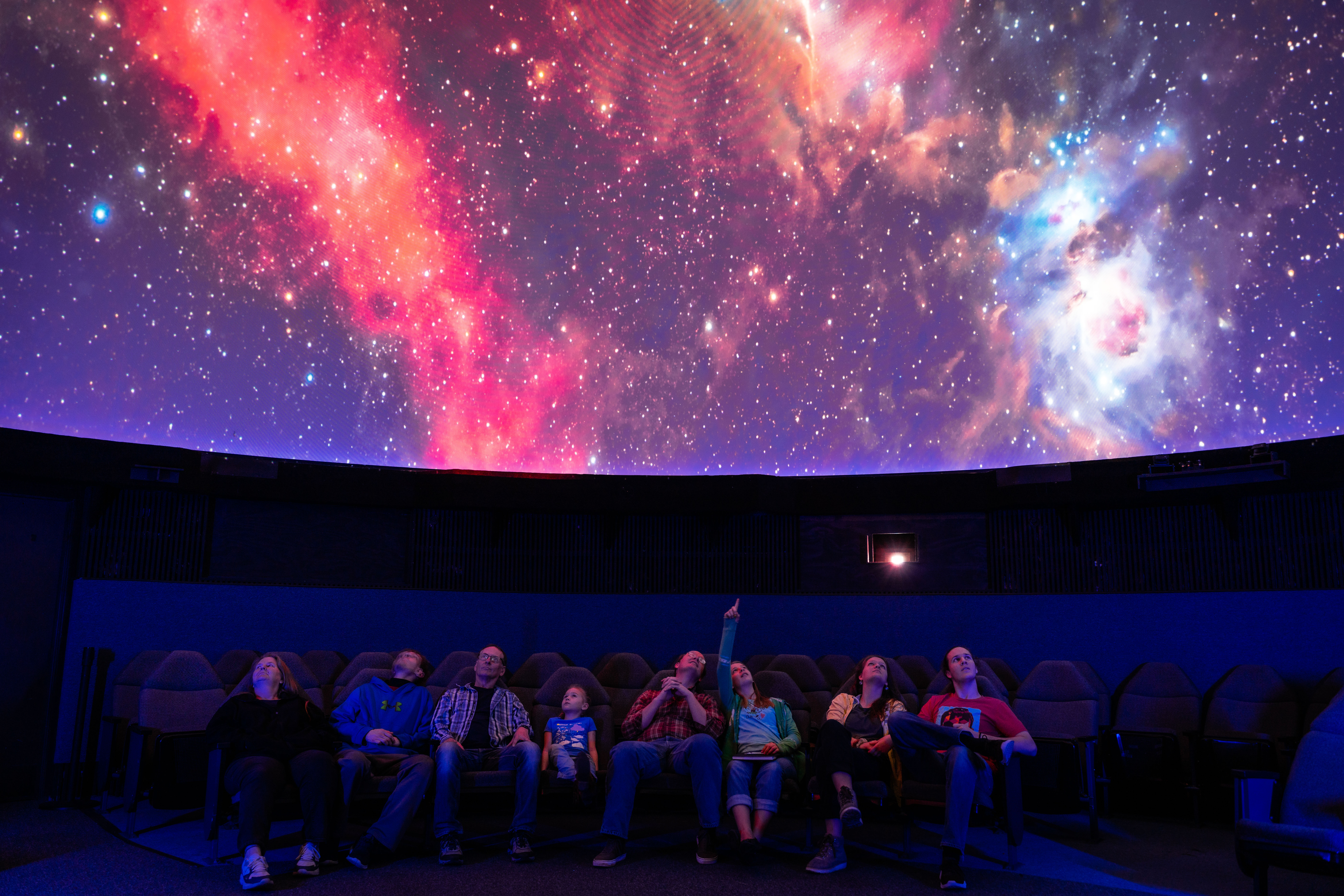
Kirkpatrick Planetarium

- Kirkpatrick Planetarium: Currently featuring laser light shows. Planetarium shows concluded on April 21, 2024.
- Love’s Planetarium: A new state-of-the-art planetarium which opened on September 20, 2024.
- CurioCity: A children's museum within the larger museum, offering playful activities such as playing instruments and balancing on a tightrope.
- Light Minded: Dedicated section exploring light and electricity.
- smART Space: An exhibit examining the intersection of science and art.
- Elemental Worlds: Digital simulation of a 220-degree forest environment.
- Science Floor: Main area of the museum featuring multiple hands-on science exhibits.
- Tinkering Garage: Focuses on the interplay between engineering, art, and technology.
- Destination Space: Explores NASA's space program and its ties to Oklahoma.
- KidSpace: Specifically tailored exhibit for younger visitors.
- Gardens: Features a garden showcasing plants native to Oklahoma.
- Aviation: Exhibit highlighting the history of aviation.
- Gadget Trees: Learning experience focused on simple machines.
- USS Oklahoma: Exhibit displaying the ship's bell, a screw, and two anchors located in front of the museum.

== International Gymnastics Hall of Fame ==
The International Gymnastics Hall of Fame, housed within Science Museum Oklahoma, showcases collections of medals, apparatus, awards, sculptures, and a library. The organization's mission is to recognize individuals who have contributed to the advancement of gymnastics. Notable inductees include Nadia Comăneci, Olga Korbut, Bart Conner, Valeri Liukin, Mary Lou Retton, Larisa Latynina, Nikolai Andrianov, and Věra Čáslavská.

== See also ==
- North American aviation halls of fame
