= OKC =

OKC may refer to:

- Oklahoma City, the capital and largest city of the U.S. state of Oklahoma
  - Oklahoma City Thunder, the city's National Basketball Association (NBA) team
  - OKC Will Rogers International Airport, the city's commercial airport (IATA abbreviation: OKC; ICAO abbreviation: KOKC)
- OkCupid, American online dating website
- Ontario Knife Company, Franklinville, New York
- Odontogenic keratocyst, a tumor in the jaw now referred to as "keratocystic odontogenic tumor"
- Open kinetic chain exercises, exercises that are performed where the hand or foot is free to move

== See also ==
- Oklahoma City (disambiguation)
