= Gerald Carr (astronaut) =

American astronaut (1932–2020)

Jerry Carr
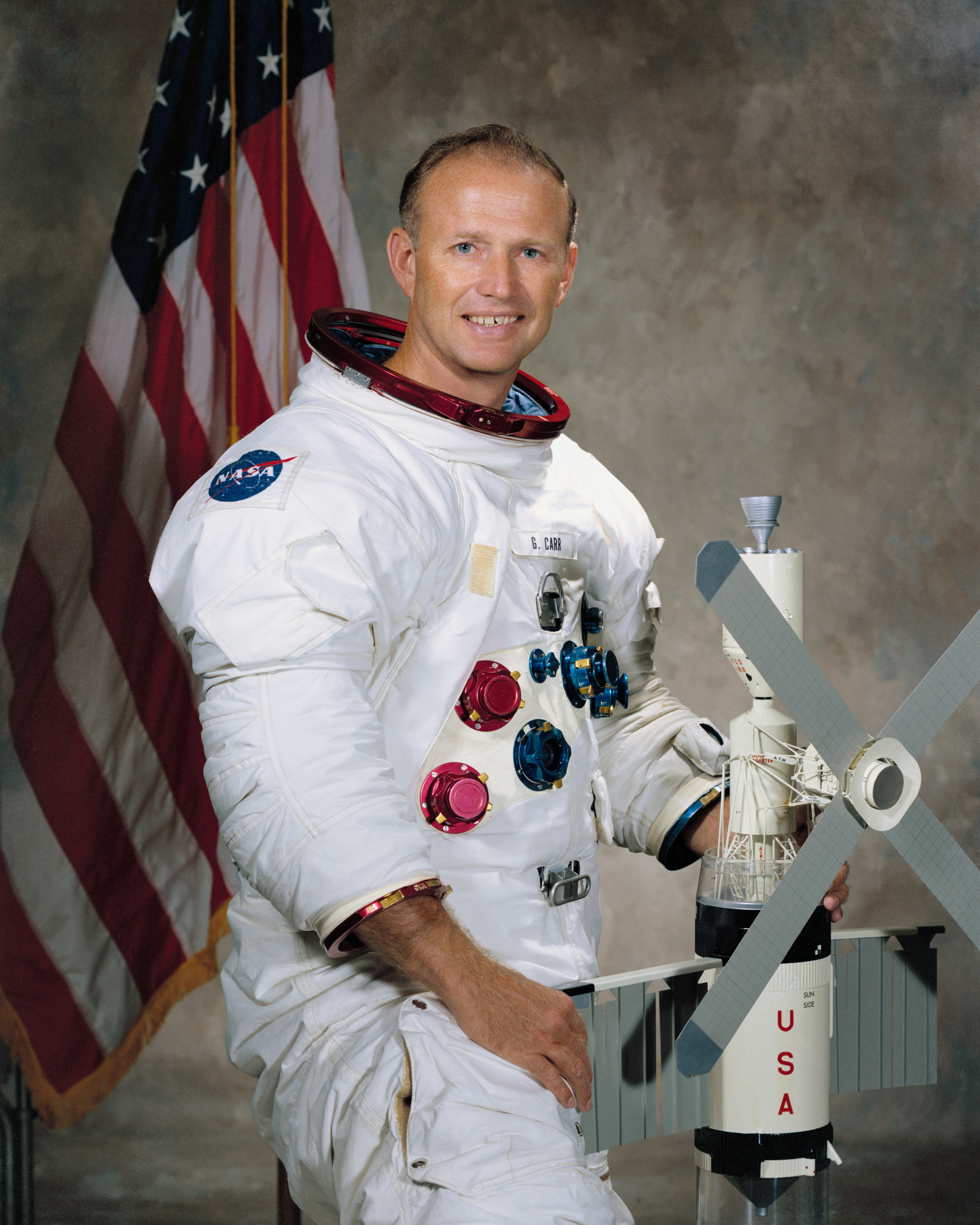
- Carr pictured in 1970
- Born: Gerald Paul Carr; August 22, 1932; Denver, Colorado, U.S.
- Died: August 26, 2020 (aged 88); Albany, New York, U.S.
- Education: University of Southern California (BEng); Naval Postgraduate School (BS); Princeton University (MS)
- Awards: NASA Distinguished Service Medal
- Space career

NASA astronaut
- Rank: Colonel, USMC
- Time in space: 84d 1h 15m
- Selection: NASA Group 5 (1966)
- Total EVAs: 3
- Total EVA time: 15h 51m
- Missions: Skylab 4
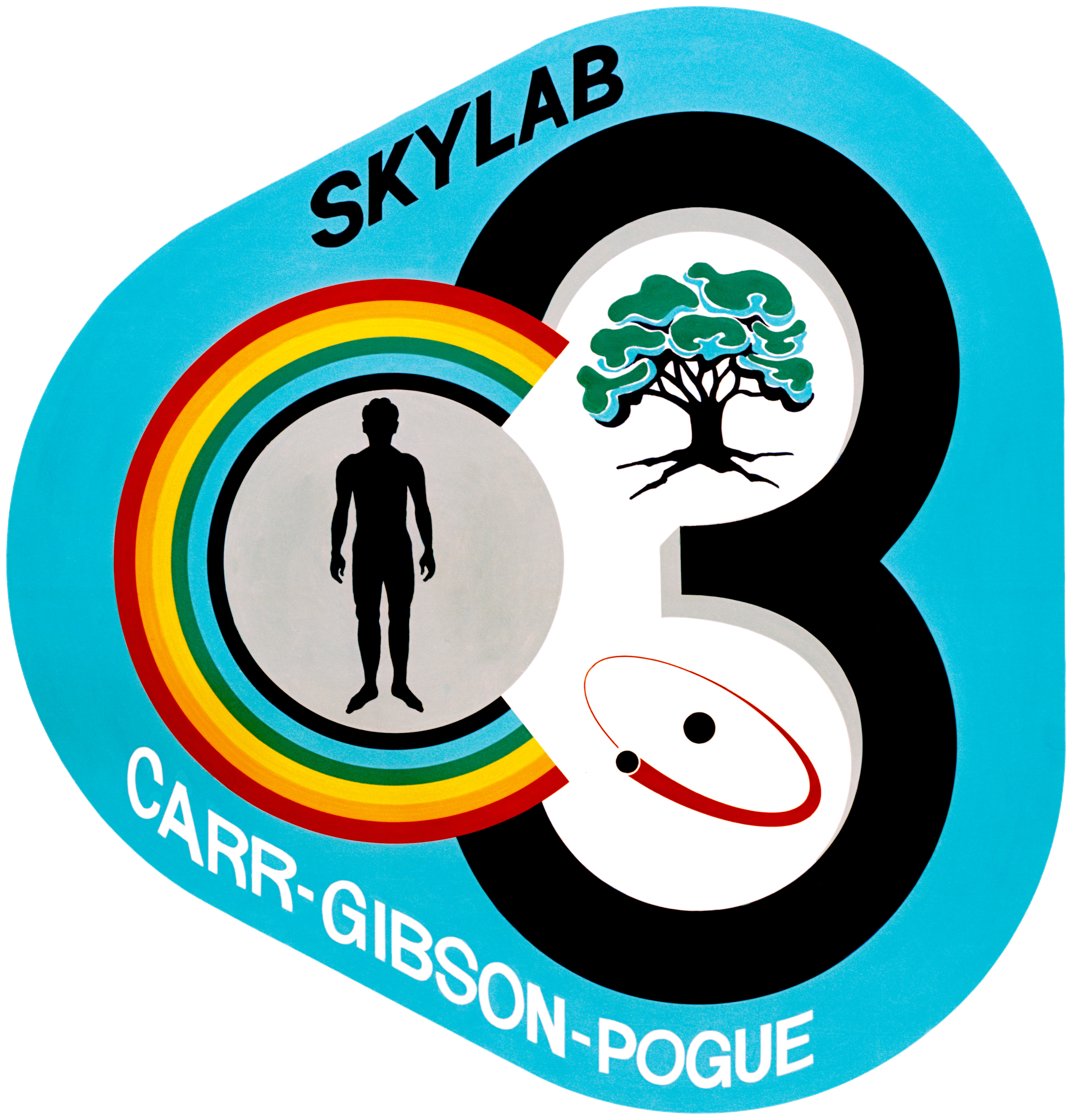
- Mission insignia
- Retired: June 25, 1977

Gerald Paul Carr (August 22, 1932 – August 26, 2020) was an American mechanical and aeronautical engineer, United States Marine Corps officer and aviator, and NASA astronaut. He was commander of Skylab 4, the third and final crewed visit to the Skylab Orbital Workshop, from November 16, 1973, to February 8, 1974.

A graduate of the University of Southern California, Carr was commissioned as a second lieutenant in the Marine Corps on graduation in 1954, and trained as an aviator. In April 1966, he was selected by NASA as one of the nineteen new astronauts. He served as a member of the support crews and as Capsule Communicator (CAPCOM) for the Apollo 8 and Apollo 12 missions and was in line to walk on the Moon as lunar module pilot of Apollo 19 before that mission was canceled in 1970. Carr and his Skylab 4 crew spent 84 days in space on the Skylab 4 mission, setting a new world record for individual time in space. He retired from the Marine Corps as colonel in September 1975, and from NASA in June 1977, and became an engineering consultant.

== Early life and education ==
Gerald Paul Carr was born in Denver, Colorado, on August 22, 1932, but was raised in Santa Ana, California, which he considered his hometown. He was the son of Thomas Ernest Carr and Freda Letha Carr (née Elkins). He was active in the Boy Scouts of America where he achieved its highest rank, Eagle Scout. Carr graduated from Santa Ana High School in 1950.

Carr received a Bachelor of Engineering degree in mechanical engineering from the University of Southern California (USC) in 1954, where he was a member of Tau Kappa Epsilon fraternity. He spent five years flying fighter jets, then returned to school. He also earned a Bachelor of Science degree in aeronautical engineering from the U.S. Naval Postgraduate School in 1961, and a Master of Science degree in aeronautical engineering from Princeton University in 1962.

Carr married his high-school sweetheart, Joann Ruth Petrie, on January 20, 1954. They had two sets of twins and six children total. They divorced in 1978. His second marriage was on September 14, 1979, to Patricia Musick, an artist and sculptor he met in 1976 who had grown up in the same area and gone to the same schools.

== Military service ==
Carr began his military service with the United States Navy, and in 1950 he was appointed a midshipman with the Naval Reserve Officers Training Corps (NROTC) detachment at the University of Southern California. Upon graduation in 1954, he received his commission as a second lieutenant in the Marine Corps and subsequently reported to The Basic School at Marine Corps Base Quantico, Virginia. He received flight training at Naval Air Station Pensacola, Florida, and Naval Air Station Kingsville, Texas, and was then assigned to VMF(AW)-114 where he gained experience in the F9F Cougar and the F-6A Skyray.

After postgraduate training, he served with VMFA-122, from 1962 to 1965, piloting the F-8 Crusader in the United States and the Far East. Other aircraft he has flown include the F-4, T-1A, T-28, T-33, T-38, H-13, and ground effect machines. He logged more than 8,000 flying hours, 5,365 hours of which were jet time.

== NASA career ==
In April 1966, Carr was one of the nineteen new astronauts selected by NASA. Upon his selection being announced, he was assigned to the test directors section of Marine Air Control Squadron 3, which tested and evaluated the Marine Tactical Data System.

Carr served as a member of the astronaut support crews and as Capsule Communicator (CAPCOM) for the Apollo 8 and Apollo 12 missions. He was involved in the development and testing of the Lunar Roving Vehicle. He was in the likely crew rotation position to fly as lunar module pilot for Apollo 19 and walk on the Moon before this mission was canceled in 1970.

=== Skylab 4 ===
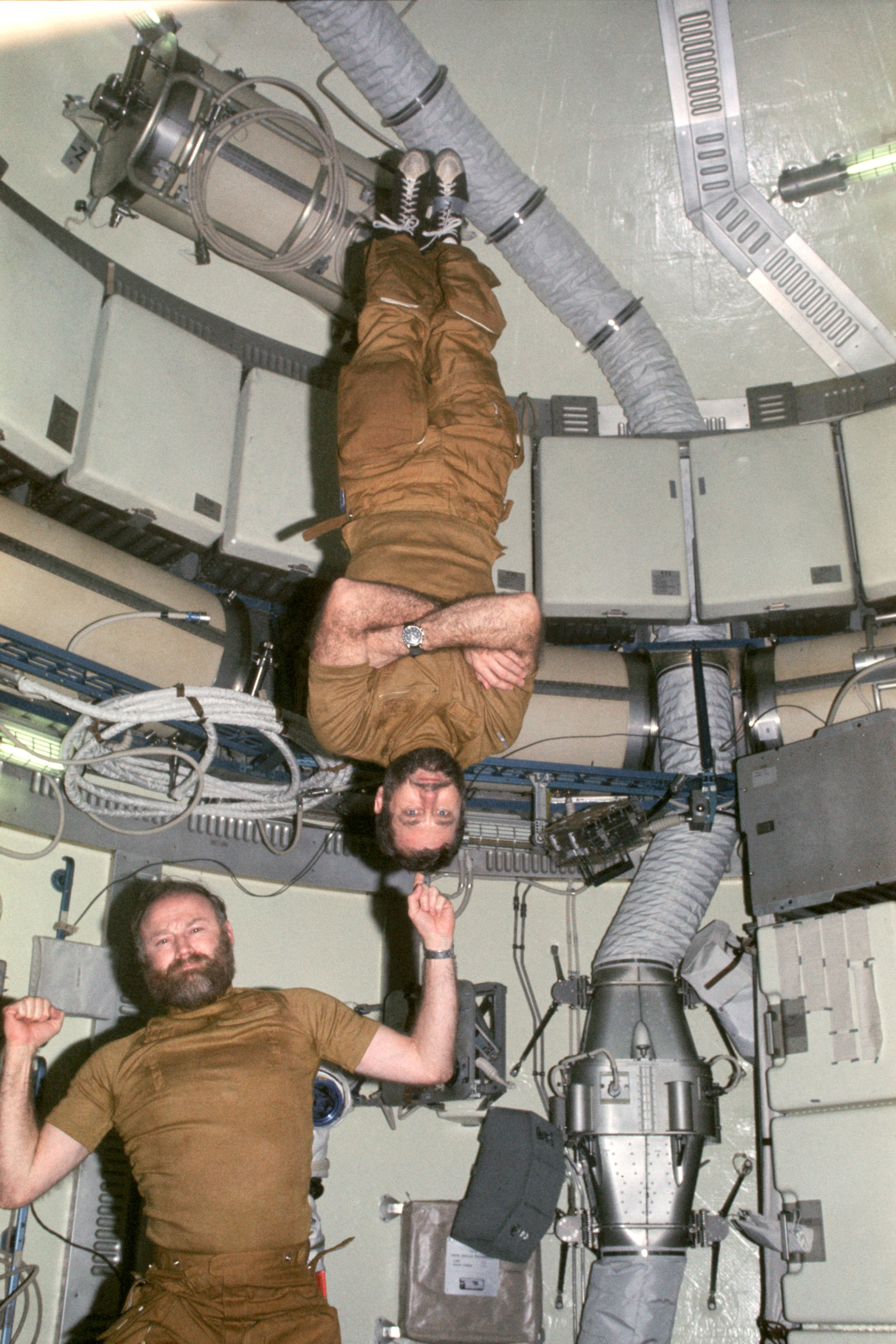
Carr demonstrates weightlessness by balancing Skylab 4 crewmate William Pogue on his finger

Carr was commander of Skylab 4 (third and final crewed visit to the Skylab Orbital Workshop) launched November 16, 1973, with splashdown on February 8, 1974. He was the first rookie astronaut to command a mission since Neil Armstrong on Gemini 8 (later followed by Joe Engle on STS-2 in 1981 and Raja Chari on SpaceX Crew-3 in 2021) and was accompanied on the record-setting 34.5-million-mile (55,500,000 km) flight by science pilot Edward Gibson and pilot William Pogue.

The crew successfully completed 56 experiments, 26 science demonstrations, 15 subsystem-detailed objectives, and 13 student investigations during their 1,214 orbits of the Earth. They carried out observations of the Earth using hand-held cameras and the camera and sensor array from Skylab's Earth Resources Experiment Package. They also recorded 338 hours of observations of the Sun using Skylab's Apollo Telescope Mount. Between February 1974 and March 1978, Carr and his Skylab 4 teammates held the world record for individual time in space: 2,017 hours 15 minutes 32 seconds, and Carr logged 15 hours and 51 minute in three EVAs outside the Orbital Workshop.

In mid-1977, Carr was named head of the design support group within the Astronaut Office responsible for providing crew support to such activities as space transportation system design, simulations, testing, and safety assessment, and for development of man/machine interface requirements.

Carr retired from the Marine Corps as colonel in September 1975 and from NASA in June 1977.

== Later life ==
Carr started his post-NASA career as manager of corporate development at Bovay Engineers, Inc., an engineering consulting firm in Houston, Texas. He later became a senior vice president, leaving the firm in 1981. He was a senior consultant on special staff to the President of Applied Research, Inc., of Los Angeles, California, from 1981 to 1983. From 1983 until 1985 Carr was manager of the University of Texas 300-inch (760 cm) Telescope Project.

Carr founded CAMUS, Inc. in 1984 based in Vermont. The family-owned corporation provided technical support services in zero-gravity human factors engineering, procedures development, operations analysis, training and systems integration. CAMUS was a major contributor as a technical support subcontractor to Boeing in the crew systems design of the International Space Station. In addition, the corporation was involved in fine art production designed by Carr's wife, artist and sculptor Pat Musick.

Carr died in Albany, New York, on August 26, 2020, four days after his 88th birthday.

== Organizations ==
Carr was a director of the Sunsat Energy Council, the Houston Pops Orchestra, and the National Space Society.

== Awards and honors ==
Carr was presented with an honorary Doctor of Science degree in aeronautical engineering from Parks College of Saint Louis University, Cahokia, Illinois, in 1976. He was awarded the National Defense Service Medal, Armed Forces Expeditionary Medal, Marine Corps Expeditionary Medal, Navy Distinguished Service Medal and the Navy Astronaut Wings. In 1974, President Richard M. Nixon presented the Skylab 4 crew with the NASA Distinguished Service Medal. That year, he also received the University of Southern California Alumni Merit Award, Boy Scouts of America Distinguished Eagle Scout Award, Marine Corps Aviation Association's Exceptional Achievement Award, FAI Gold Space Medal, and the City of New York and City of Chicago Gold Medals He was one of 24 Apollo astronauts who were inducted into the U.S. Astronaut Hall of Fame in 1997.

The three Skylab astronaut crews were awarded the 1973 Robert J. Collier Trophy "For proving beyond question the value of man in future explorations of space and the production of data of benefit to all the people on Earth". Fédération Aéronautique Internationale awarded the Skylab 4 crew the De La Vaulx Medal and Vladimir M. Komarov Diploma for 1974. The American Astronautical Society's 1975 Flight Achievement Award was awarded to the Skylab 4 crew, and Carr accepted the Dr. Robert H. Goddard Memorial Trophy that year from President Gerald Ford on behalf of the crew. The Skylab 4 crew also won the AIAA Haley Astronautics Award in 1975 "For demonstrated outstanding courage and skill during their record-breaking 84-day Skylab mission". In 1974, Gerald P. Carr Intermediate School (previously Ralph C. Smedley Junior High) in Santa Ana, California, was renamed in his honor, and the school's team name is the Astros, in honor of his NASA achievements.

== See also ==
- The Astronaut Monument
- List of Eagle Scouts
- List of spaceflight records
