= Edward Gibson =

American astronaut (born 1936)

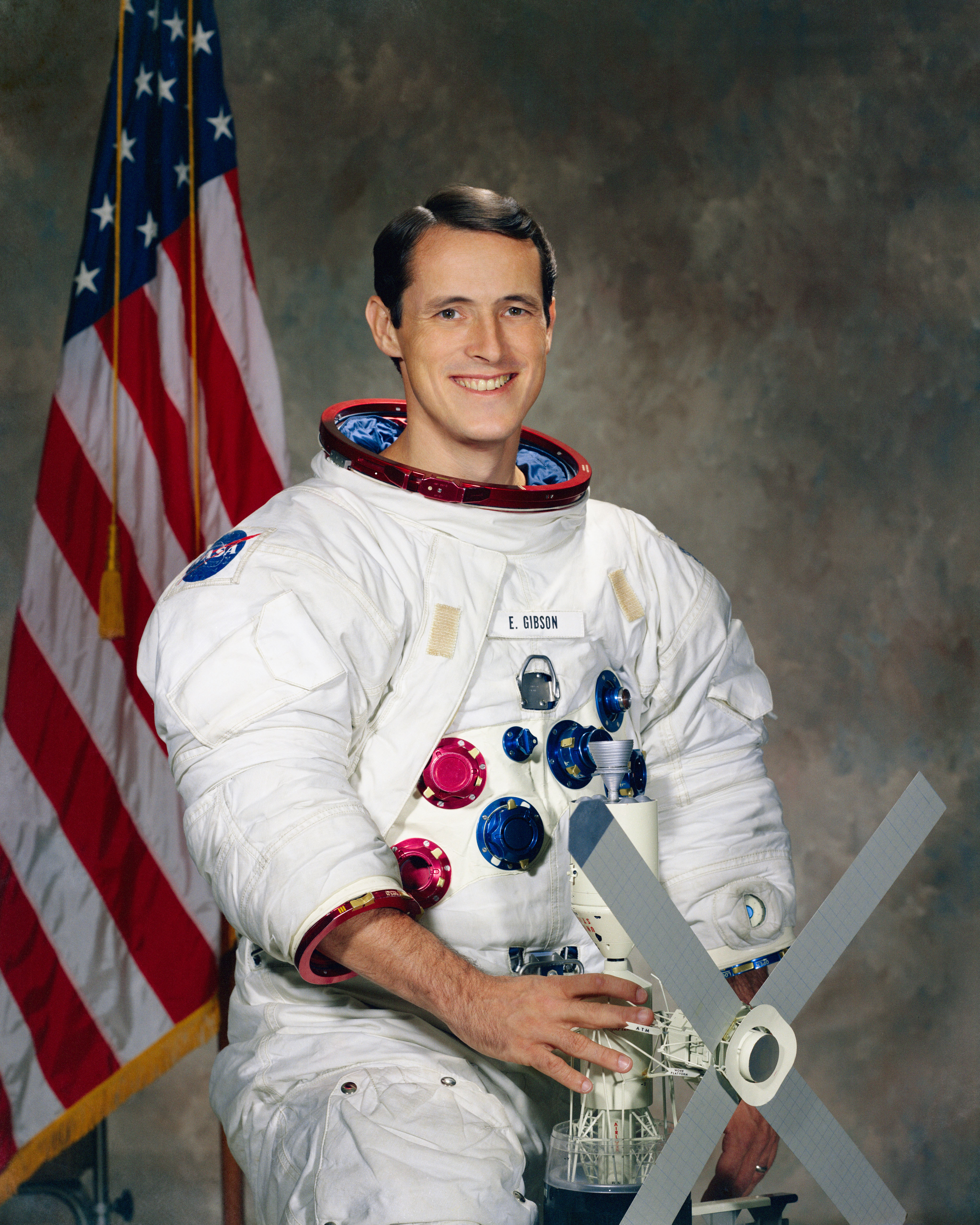
- Gibson with a Skylab model
- Born: Edward George Gibson; November 8, 1936 (age 89); Buffalo, New York, U.S.
- Education: University of Rochester (BS); California Institute of Technology (MS, PhD)
- Awards: NASA Distinguished Service Medal
- Space career

NASA astronaut
- Time in space: 84d 1h 15m
- Selection: NASA Group 4 (1965)
- Total EVAs: 3
- Total EVA time: 15h 22m
- Missions: Skylab 4
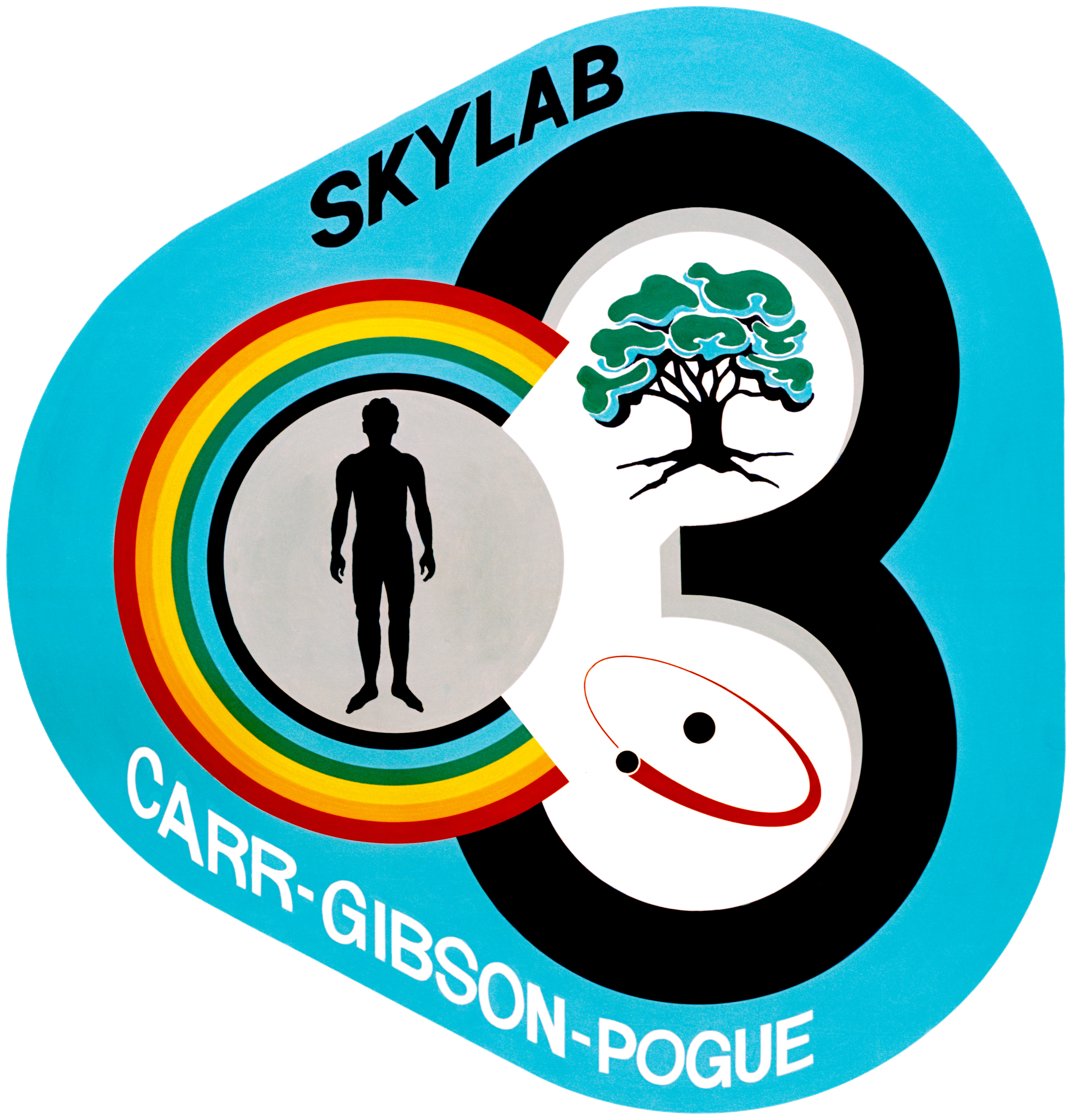
- Mission insignia
- Retired: October 31, 1982
- Scientific career
- Thesis: Ionization Phenomena in a Gas-Particle Plasma (1964)

Edward George Gibson (born November 8, 1936) is a former NASA astronaut, pilot, engineer, and physicist.

Before becoming an astronaut, Gibson graduated from the University of Rochester and the California Institute of Technology. He became a research assistant in jet propulsion while completing his studies, and eventually became a research scientist for Philco Corporation until joining NASA in 1965. Gibson is the last surviving crew member of Skylab 4.

Gibson was selected as part of NASA Astronaut Group 4, the first group of scientist-astronauts. He served on the support crew of Apollo 12, the second Moon landing mission, before working on the development of the Skylab space station. In 1973–74, Gibson made his only flight into space as science pilot aboard Skylab 4, the third and final crewed flight to Skylab. He, along with Commander Gerald Carr and Pilot William Pogue, spent just over 84 days in space.

Gibson resigned from NASA in December 1974, but returned in 1977 to preside over the selection of scientist-astronaut candidates. Gibson retired from NASA for the last time in October 1982.

== Early life and education ==
Gibson was born in Buffalo, New York, on November 8, 1936. From ages 2 to 8, Gibson battled osteomyelitis—soft spots in bones—and spent many months in and out of hospitals. Newly-available penicillin cured the disease. To strengthen his leg that was nearly amputated, Gibson took up sports: swimming, football, and track. He primarily used swimming to strengthen his leg. He was active in the Boy Scouts of America. He earned the rank of First Class.

Gibson graduated from Kenmore Senior High School in Kenmore, New York, in 1955, and earned a Bachelor of Science degree in engineering from the University of Rochester in June 1959. At the University of Rochester, Gibson became a member of the Theta Chi fraternity. He received a Master of Science degree in engineering (jet propulsion option) from the California Institute of Technology (Caltech) in June 1960 and a PhD in engineering with a minor in physics from Caltech in June 1964. He was supervised by Maria Wonenburger.

== Early career ==
While studying at Caltech, Gibson was a research assistant in the field of jet propulsion and classical physics. His technical publications are in the fields of plasma physics and solar physics. He was senior research scientist with the Applied Research Laboratories of the Philco Corporation at Newport Beach, California, from June 1964 until moving to NASA. While at Philco, he did research in lasers and the optical breakdown of gases.

Gibson has logged more than 4,300 hours flying time—2,270 hours in jet aircraft.

== NASA career ==
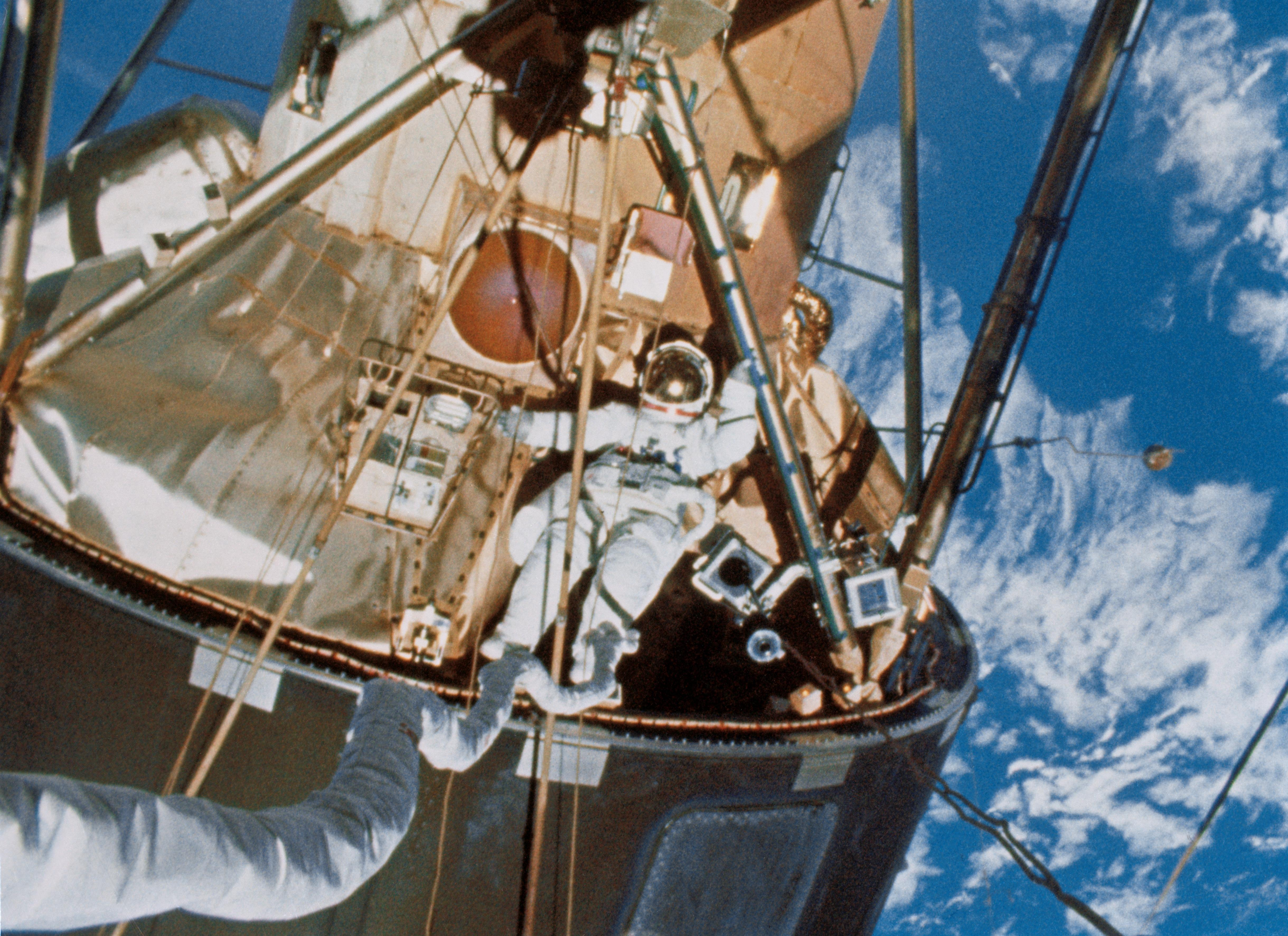
Gibson's spacewalk during his time on Skylab 4

Gibson was selected as a scientist-astronaut by NASA in June 1965. He completed a 53-week course in flight training at Williams Air Force Base, Arizona, and earned his Air Force wings. Since then, he has flown helicopters and the T-38.

He served as a member of the astronaut support crew and as a CAPCOM for the Apollo 12 lunar landing, becoming the first from the scientist-astronaut group to get a crew assignment of any kind. He also participated in the design and testing of many elements of the Skylab space station. As part of his preparation for the Skylab program, Gibson studied solar physics, ultimately writing an introductory monograph/textbook on solar astrophysics The Quiet Sun, apart from 1973 English edition published in the United States there was 1977 Russian edition of this book, published in the Soviet Union by Mir Publishers.

=== Skylab 4 ===
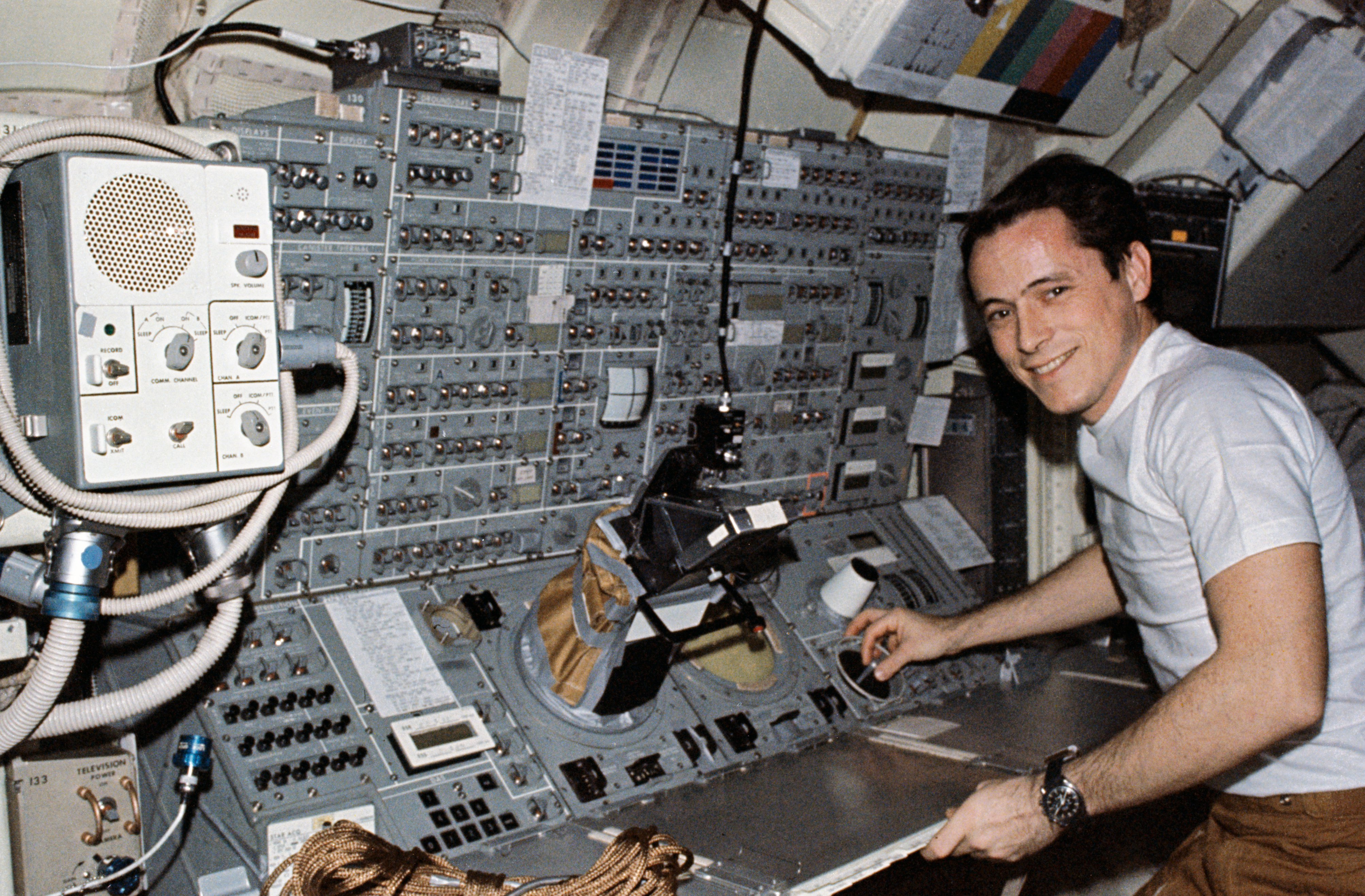
Gibson at the Apollo Telescope Mount console in the Skylab Multiple Docking Adapter

Gibson was the science pilot of Skylab 4. The third and final crewed visit to the Skylab space station, it launched November 16, 1973, and concluded February 8, 1974. This was the longest crewed flight (84 days 1 hour 15 minutes) in the history of crewed space exploration at that time. Gibson was accompanied on the record-setting 34.5-million-mile flight by Commander Gerald P. Carr and Pilot William R. Pogue. They successfully completed 56 experiments, 26 science demonstrations, 15 subsystem detailed objectives, and 13 student investigations during their 1,214 revolutions of the Earth. They also acquired a wide variety of Earth resources observations data using Skylab's Earth resources experiment package camera and sensor array. Dr. Gibson was the crewman primarily responsible for the 338 hours of Apollo Telescope Mount operation, which made extensive observations of solar processes.

Until the Soviet Union's Soyuz 26 broke the record in March 1978, Gibson and his Skylab 4 teammates held the world record for individual time in space: 2,017 hours 15 minutes 32 seconds. Gibson logged 15 hours and 22 minutes in three EVAs outside the Skylab Orbital Workshop. Gibson is the last surviving Skylab 4 crew member (Carr died in 2020, and Pogue died in 2014).

Gibson resigned from NASA in December 1974 to do research on Skylab solar physics data as a senior staff scientist with the Aerospace Corporation of Los Angeles, California. Beginning in March 1976, he served for one year as a consultant to ERNO Raumfahrttechnik GmbH, in West Germany, on Spacelab design under the sponsorship of a U.S. Senior Scientist Award form the Alexander von Humboldt Foundation. In March 1977, Gibson returned to the Astronaut Office astronaut candidate selection and training as Chief of the Scientist-Astronaut Candidates. During his second tenure at NASA, Gibson had hoped to fly on another space station mission due to his experience on Skylab, but at the same time was not keen on flying a Space Shuttle mission. He served as CAPCOM for STS-1. Gibson ultimately decided to retire from NASA again on October 31, 1982.

== Post-NASA career ==
From July 1980 to August 1987, Gibson worked for TRW as a project manager at Space Park in support of Space Station Freedom.

In October 1990, Gibson began his own consulting firm, Gibson International Corp. The firm provides consulting services on program management, market development and space infrastructure design and operations.

He has performed a significant amount of speaking and writing, and published a text book in solar physics, two novels, Reach (1989) and In the Wrong Hands (1992), and edited The Greatest Adventure, a 1994 compilation of stories and pictures on space missions from many astronauts and cosmonauts around the world.

He is the author of Space: Ever Farther, Ever Faster, a book reflecting on the history of space exploration and his experiences aboard Skylab 4 which was published by Book Publishers LLC in 2025.

== Special honors and awards ==
Gibson was awarded a National Science Foundation Fellowship and the R.C. Baker Fellowship at the California Institute of Technology. He received the Johnson Space Center Certificate of Commendation (1970). He received the City of New York Gold Medal (1974). Gibson, along with the rest of the Skylab astronauts, received the City of Chicago Gold Medal in 1974. Gibson received the 1974 FAI Yuri Gagarin Gold Medal. In 1976, he received the U.S. Scientist Prize from the Alexander von Humboldt Foundation, which provided funds to research in West Germany for a year. He received the JSC Special Achievement Award in 1978. Gibson has also been presented with honorary doctorates of science from the University of Rochester and Wagner College in New York City, both in 1974.

The three Skylab astronaut crews were awarded the 1973 Robert J. Collier Trophy "For proving beyond question the value of man in future explorations of space and the production of data of benefit to all the people on Earth." In 1974, President Nixon presented the Skylab 4 crew with the NASA Distinguished Service Medal. The American Astronautical Society's 1975 Flight Achievement Award was awarded to the Skylab 4 crew. Federation Aeronautique Internationale awarded the Skylab 4 crew the De La Vaulx Medal and V. M. Komarov Diploma for 1974. Carr accepted the 1975 Dr. Robert H. Goddard Memorial Trophy from President Ford, awarded to the Skylab astronauts. The Skylab 4 crew won the AIAA Haley Astronautics Award in 1975 "For demonstrated outstanding courage and skill during their record-breaking 84-day Skylab mission". He was one of 24 Apollo astronauts who were inducted into the U.S. Astronaut Hall of Fame in 1997.

== Personal life ==
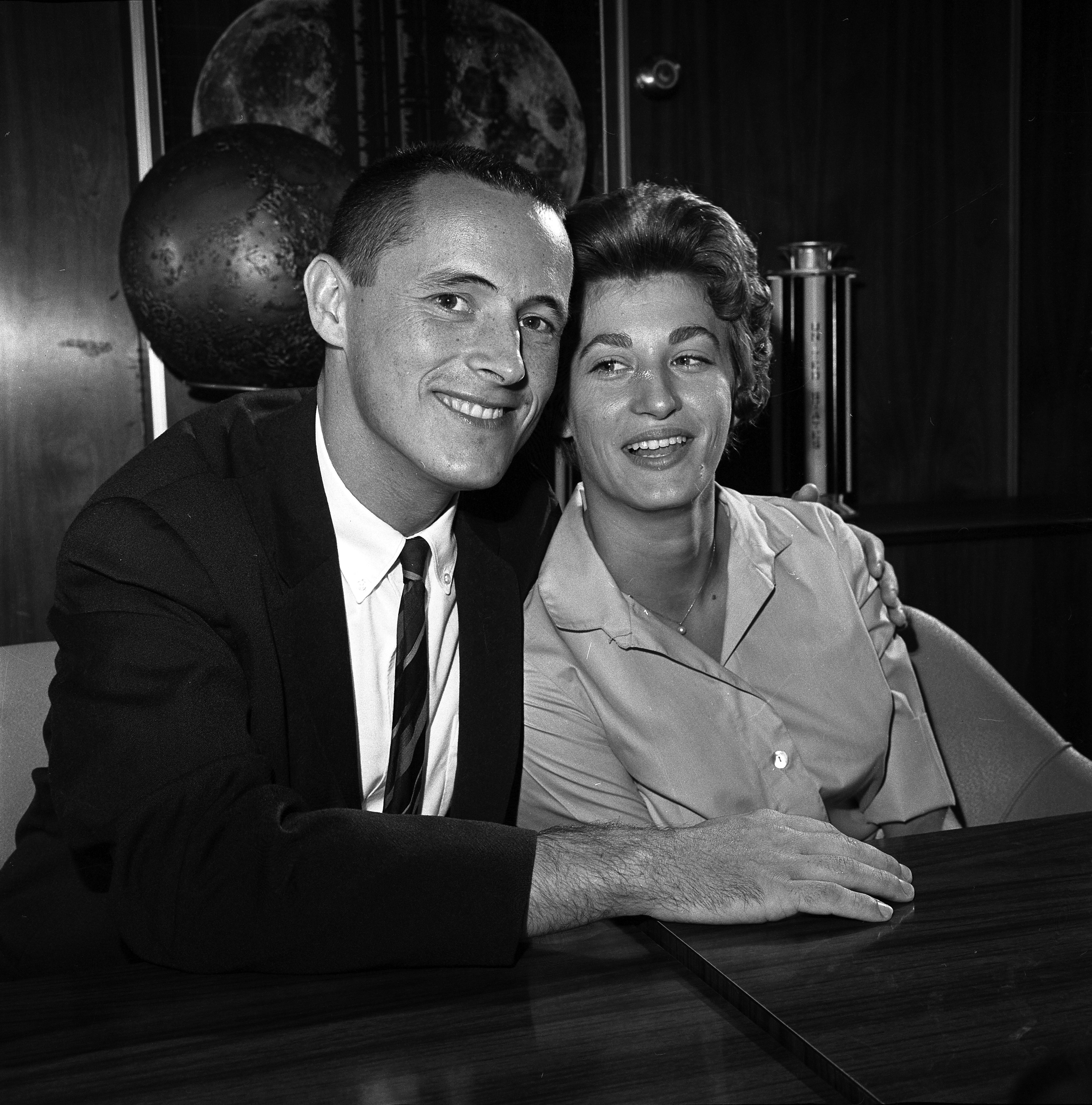
Edward and Julianne Gibson

Gibson is married to Julianne Volk of Tonawanda, New York. He has four children: Jannet Lynn (born November 9, 1960), John Edward (born May 2, 1964), Julie Ann (born October 12, 1968), and Joseph Michael (born July 11, 1971).

== Media appearances ==
In the 1998 HBO miniseries From the Earth to the Moon, Gibson was played by actor Geoffrey Nauffts. As his character serves as Capcom for Apollo 12 regardless of actual shift changes, it can be argued that he is a composite character of Gibson, Gerald Carr, and Don Lind.

== See also ==
- The Astronaut Monument
- Booz Allen Hamilton
- List of spaceflight records
