= Canceled Apollo missions =

Canceled space missions

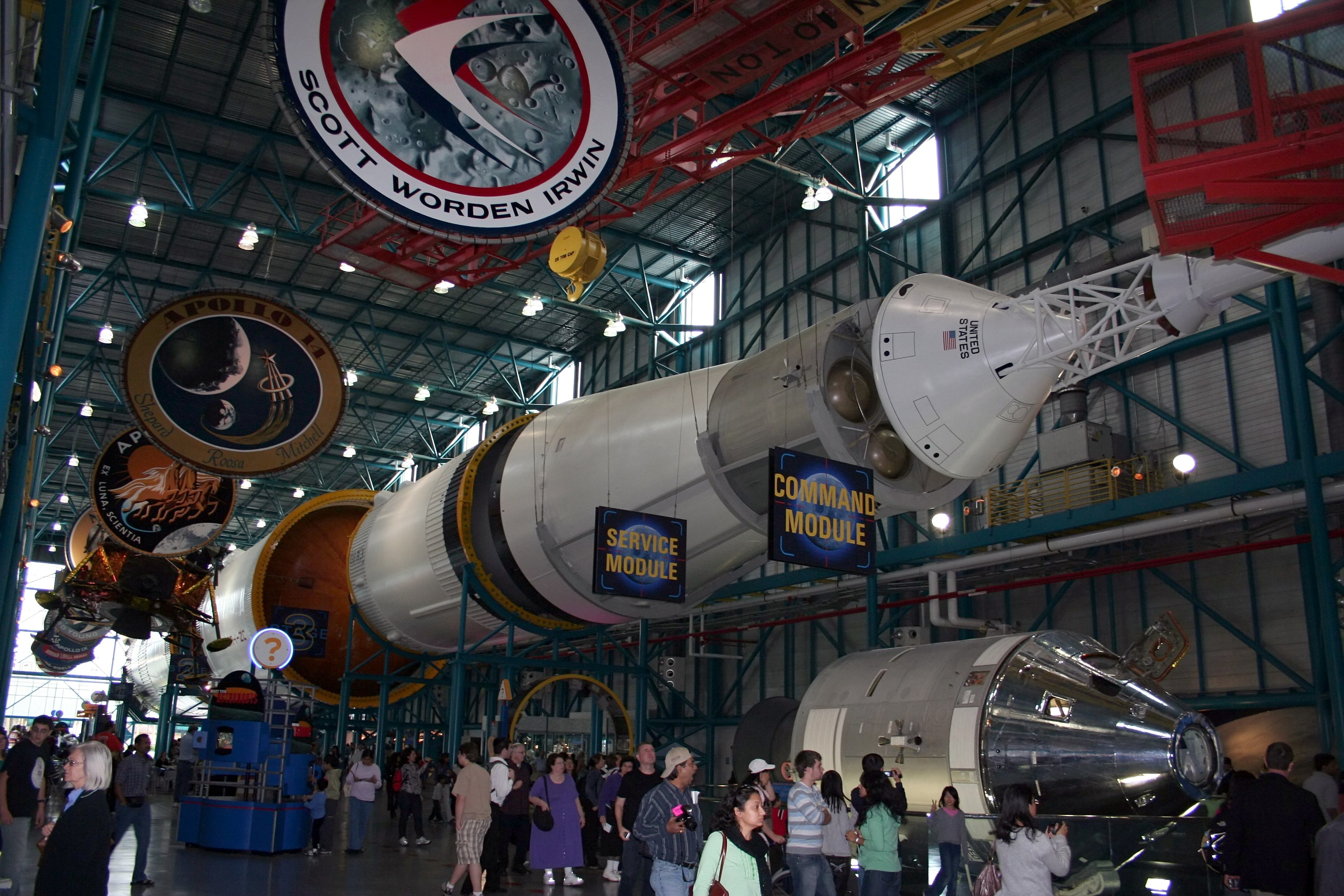
Unused Saturn V rocket on display at the Kennedy Space Center Visitor Complex

Several planned missions of the Apollo crewed Moon landing program of the 1960s and 1970s were canceled, for reasons which included changes in technical direction, the Apollo 1 fire, the Apollo 13 incident, hardware delays, and budget limitations. After the landing by Apollo 12, Apollo 20, which would have been the final crewed mission to the Moon, was canceled to allow Skylab to launch as a "dry workshop" (assembled on the ground in an unused S-IVB Saturn IB second stage). The next two missions, Apollo 18 and Apollo 19, were later canceled after Apollo 13 and further budget cuts. Two Skylab missions also ended up being canceled. Two complete Saturn V rockets remained unused and were put on display in the United States.

== Planned missions prior to Apollo 1 fire ==
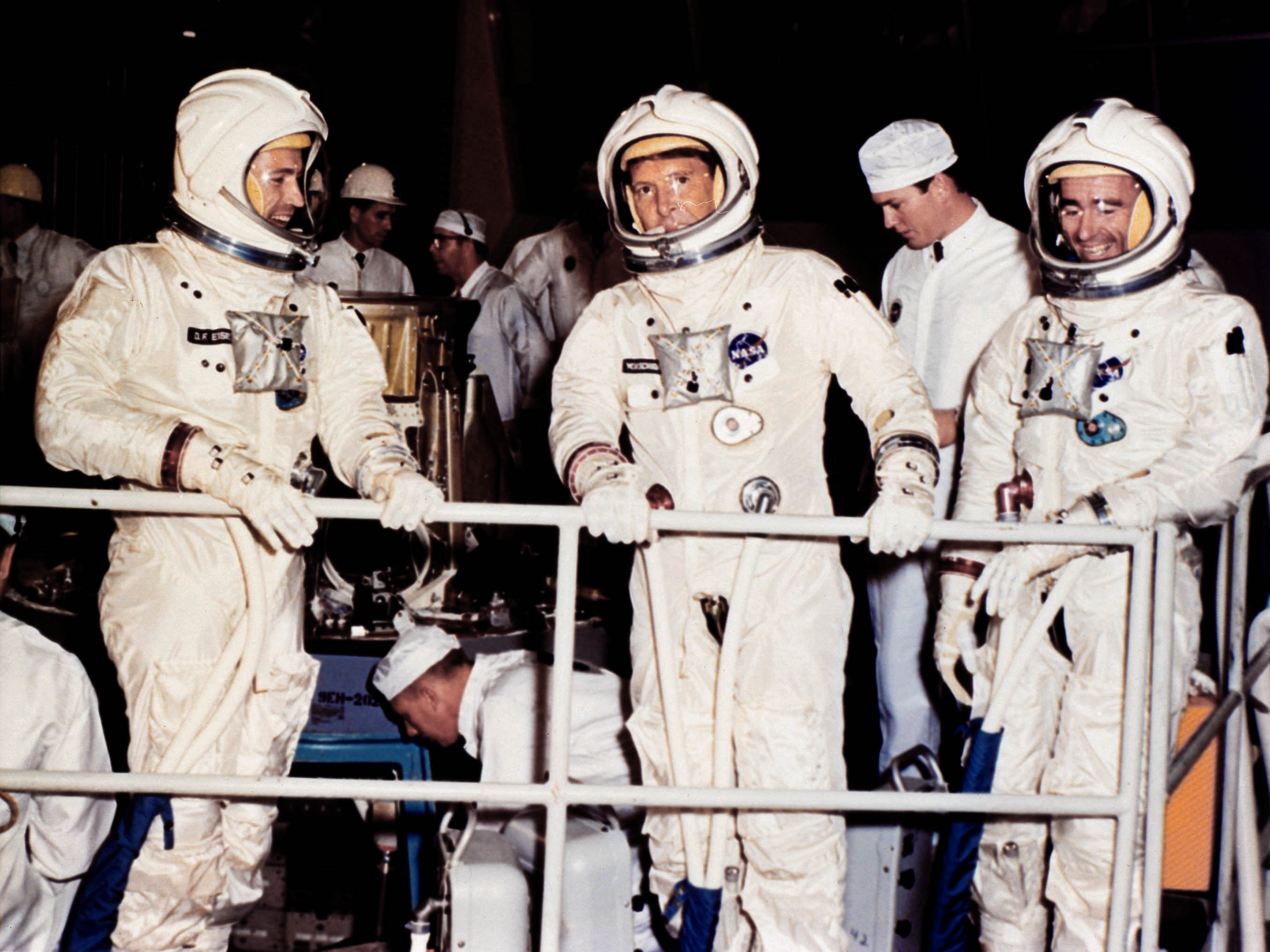
The prime crew for the second planned Apollo crewed flight prepares for mission simulator tests at the North American Aviation plant prior to the Apollo 1 fire. (Left to right) Donn F. Eisele, senior pilot; Walter M. Schirra, command pilot; and Walter Cunningham, pilot. (September 1966).

In September 1962, NASA planned to make four crewed low-Earth-orbital test flights of partially equipped Block I Command/Service Modules (CSM) using the Saturn I launch vehicle, designated SA-11 through SA-14, in 1965 and 1966. However, the limited payload capacity of the Saturn I compared to the uprated Saturn IB would have severely limited the systems carried, and thus the testing value of these flights. Therefore, NASA canceled these flights in October 1963, and replaced them with two crewed Saturn IB missions, designated AS-204 and AS-205. These would be followed by the first uncrewed flight of the Lunar Module (LM) on AS-206, then the third crewed mission, designated AS-207/208, would use AS-207 to launch the crew in an improved Block II CSM, which would rendezvous and dock with the LM launched uncrewed on AS-208.

The crew selected on March 21, 1966, for AS-204 consisted of Command Pilot Virgil "Gus" Grissom, Senior Pilot Ed White, and Pilot Roger Chaffee, who named their mission Apollo 1. AS-205 was to be named Apollo 2, and AS-207/208 would be Apollo 3. The AS-205 crew were Wally Schirra, Donn Eisele and Walter Cunningham. However, AS-205 was later deemed unnecessary and officially canceled on December 22, 1966.

Schirra's crew then became the backup for Grissom's crew, and the crewed LM mission became the second crewed mission, redesignated AS-205/208 and crewed by the original backup for Grissom's crew: Command Pilot Jim McDivitt, CSM Pilot David Scott and LM Pilot Rusty Schweickart. They immediately began their training in the first Block II Command Module CM-101, as Grissom's crew were preparing for a February 1967 launch.

Then, on January 27, 1967, Grissom, White, and Chaffee were killed in a flash fire in their spacecraft cabin during a test on the launch pad, interrupting the program for 19 months to identify and fix the root causes of numerous safety problems. This forced cancellation of plans to fly any crewed Block I spacecraft, and effectively forced a "reboot" of all crewed mission plans.

== Development missions after Apollo 1 fire ==
In September 1967, NASA created a list of remaining mission types necessary to achieve the first crewed lunar landing, each designated by a letter A through G, where G would be the first crewed landing. This list was later extended through letter J to cover follow-on lunar missions.

Two uncrewed Saturn V test launches (A missions) were flown as Apollo 4 and Apollo 6. A third test was planned but canceled as unnecessary.

The first development Lunar Module, LM-1 was flown uncrewed (B mission) as Apollo 5. A second uncrewed test was planned using LM-2 but was canceled as unnecessary. LM-2 was retrofitted to look like a production LM which would land men on the Moon and was donated to the Smithsonian National Air and Space Museum, where it is currently on display as a simulation of the Apollo 11 first landing.

Schirra's crew would fly the C mission, first crewed CSM (Block II CSM-101, retrofitted with the cabin safety improvements) as Apollo 7 in October 1968.

McDivitt's crew and mission were kept as the first crewed development LM flight (D mission); this was planned to be Apollo 8 in December 1968, now using a single Saturn V launch vehicle instead of two separate Saturn IB launches. The E mission was planned as an elliptical medium Earth orbit test of the operational LM with the CSM in a simulated lunar mission to an apogee of 4,600 miles (7,400 km), to be commanded by Frank Borman in March 1969.

Of all the components of the Apollo system, the LM had the most technical issues. It was behind schedule and when LM-3 was shipped to the Kennedy Space Center in June 1968, over 101 separate defects were discovered. Grumman Aircraft Engineering Corporation, which was the lead contractor for the LM predicted that the first man-rated LM, to be used for the D mission, would not be ready until at least February 1969, delaying the entire sequence.

George Low, the manager of the Apollo Spacecraft Program Office, proposed a solution in August 1968. Since the CSM would be ready three months before the Lunar Module, they could fly a CSM-only mission in December 1968. But instead of just repeating the C mission that would fly the CSM in Earth orbit, they could send the CSM all the way to the Moon and maybe even enter into orbit. This mission was dubbed "C-Prime" (an imaginary letter between C and D). This new mission would allow NASA to practice procedures for a lunar flight that would otherwise have to wait until Apollo 10, the F mission. There were also concerns from the Central Intelligence Agency that the Soviet Union was planning their own circumlunar flight for December to upstage the Americans once again (see Zond program). McDivitt's crew—who had grown accustomed to working with LM-3 and preparing for its flight—was kept on the D mission which now became Apollo 9, while Borman's crew would fly the CSM lunar orbit mission on Apollo 8, and the E mission was canceled.

The swap of crews was also decisive in who would be the first man to walk on the Moon. Pete Conrad was backup commander for McDivitt's crew, and by the process of crew rotation, would have been in line for commander of Apollo 11 three flights later. Neil Armstrong got this honor by virtue of being Borman's backup commander.

== Follow-on lunar missions ==
NASA contracted to have 15 flight-worthy Saturn V rockets produced. Apollo 11 achieved the first landing with the sixth Saturn V, leaving nine for future landings. The following landing sites were chosen (see clarification below) for these missions, planned to occur at intervals of approximately four months through July 1972. This list of landing sites was not compiled by the Apollo Site Selection Board (ASSB), or its various sub-groups, which made the actual landing site selections one to two flights in advance. This list was compiled by a consulting firm, and was only a set of planning tools and suggestions. The ASSB would have selected actual sites for the cancelled Apollo missions, and since these missions never went through the site selection process, the list presented here did not reflect actual planning of the Apollo Program Office or NASA HQ, as referenced in To A Rocky Moon, by Donald Wilhelms.

- Apollo 12 (H1) November 1969, Ocean of Storms (Surveyor 3 site)
- Apollo 13 (H2) April 1970, Fra Mauro highlands
- Apollo 14 (H3) Littrow crater
- Apollo 15 (H4) Censorinus crater

The last five missions were J-class missions using the Extended Lunar Module, capable of three-day stays on the Moon and carrying the Lunar Roving Vehicle:

- Apollo 16 (J1) Descartes Highlands
- Apollo 17 (J2) Marius Hills
- Apollo 18 (J3) Copernicus crater
- Apollo 19 (J4) Hadley Rille
- Apollo 20 (J5) Tycho crater (Surveyor 7 site)

As the later missions were up to three years in the future, little detailed planning was made, and a variety of landing sites were given for some flights. According to "NASA OMSF, Manned Space Flight Weekly Report" dated July 28, 1969, Apollo 18 would have landed at Schröter's Valley in February 1972, Apollo 19 in the Hyginus rille region in July 1972, and Apollo 20 in Copernicus crater in December 1972.

Other proposed landing sites and schedules for the last three missions included Gassendi crater (Apollo 18, July 1973), Copernicus (Apollo 19, December 1973), and Marius Hills or Tycho crater (Apollo 20, July 1974).

As a number of ambitious Apollo Applications Programs were planned, it was still hoped in 1969 that further Saturn V launch vehicles could be contracted, allowing for more ambitious lunar missions.

In the NASA report "Scientific Rationale Summaries for Apollo Candidate Lunar Exploration Landing Sites" from March 11, 1970, Apollo 18 is targeted for Copernicus, and Apollo 19 is assigned Hadley rille (the eventual landing site of Apollo 15). The Apollo 20 mission had been canceled two months before, but the report still suggested its target, Hyginus rille, possibly as an alternative Apollo 19 landing site.

=== Cancellations ===
On January 4, 1970, NASA announced the cancellation of Apollo 20 so that its Saturn V launch rocket could be used to launch the Skylab space station as a "dry workshop" (assembled on the ground), instead of constructing it as a "wet workshop" from a spent S-IVB upper stage of a Saturn IB launch vehicle. Also, budget restrictions had limited the Saturn V production to the original 15 that were contracted. After NASA Deputy Administrator George M. Low announced that the final three Moon landings were rescheduled for 1973 and 1974, following the three planned Skylab missions, Chief Astronaut Deke Slayton moved Lind to Apollo Applications, stating that "with the cancellation of 20, I could see I just wasn't going to have a flight for him".

Another lunar landing was lost in April 1970 when Apollo 13 had its in-flight failure, and the Fra Mauro landing site was reassigned to Apollo 14. Then on September 2, 1970, NASA announced it was canceling the H4 and J4 missions after more budget cuts. Skylab was postponed to 1973, and the final landing schedule became:

- Apollo 14 (H2) Fra Mauro Formation, February 1971
- Apollo 15 (J1) Hadley–Apennine, July 1971
- Apollo 16 (J2) Descartes Highlands, April 1972
- Apollo 17 (J3) Taurus–Littrow valley, December 1972

At the time, 35 of NASA's 49 active astronauts were waiting for a mission.

In the final days of the program, Apollo 17 LMP Schmitt aggressively lobbied for a crewed landing on the far side of the Moon, targeting the far side Tsiolkovskiy crater. Schmitt's ambitious proposal included the launch into lunar orbit of special communications satellites based on the existing TIROS satellites to allow contact with the astronauts during their powered descent and lunar surface operations. NASA administrators rejected these plans because of lack of funding and added risk.

In August 1971, President Richard Nixon proposed to cancel all remaining lunar landings (Apollo 16 and 17). His Office of Management and Budget Deputy Director Caspar Weinberger was opposed to this and persuaded Nixon to keep the remaining Moon missions, but recommended that if such cancellation did happen, it should be "on the ground that Apollo 15 was so successful in gathering needed data that we can now shift, sooner than previously expected, to the Space Shuttle, Grand Tour, NERVA, etc".

John Young, who flew on Apollo 10 and 16, believed that fear of losing astronauts was a reason why NASA canceled Apollo 18, 19, and 20.

=== Crew assignments ===
Slayton was the director of Flight Crew Operations and effectively chose the crews for the flights. He did not intend to give astronauts two lunar landing commands but, according to historian Michael Cassutt, as late as the summer of 1969—when 10 landings were still scheduled—Slayton planned to give Lunar Module pilots Fred Haise, Edgar Mitchell, and James Irwin the opportunity to walk again on the Moon as commanders. During the early Apollo missions he used a rotation system of assigning a crew as backup and then, three missions later, as the prime crew. However, by the later Apollo flights, this system was used less frequently as astronauts left the program, and Slayton wanted to give rookies a chance, and astronauts did not want to take backup positions that no longer could lead to prime-crew spots. Harrison Schmitt was likely to be the first scientist to the Moon on Apollo 18 or 19, with Don L. Lind the second.

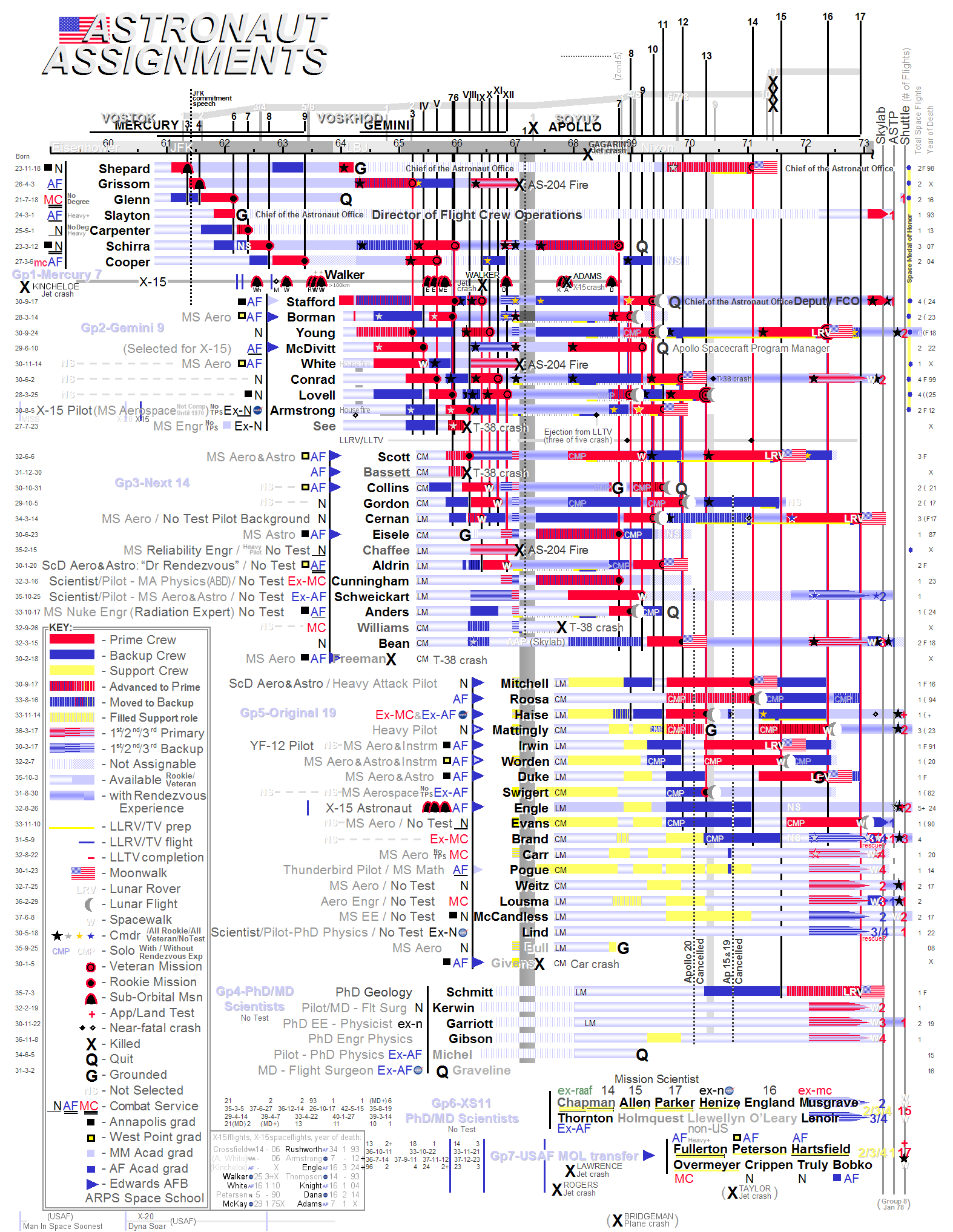
A Gantt chart showing how astronaut assignments were deeply affected by cancelled Apollo missions.

In the case of Apollo 18, the crew was probably the Apollo 15 backup crew:

- Richard F. Gordon Jr. (commander (CDR))
- Vance D. Brand (Command Module pilot (CMP))
- Harrison Schmitt (Lunar Module pilot (LMP))

When Apollo 18 was canceled, Schmitt was moved up to Apollo 17 under pressure from the scientific community, replacing Joe Engle. Schmitt, a geologist, became the twelfth man and the only professional scientist to walk on the Moon.

Slayton's intention for the Apollo 19 crew (prior to cancellation) was the original Apollo 16 backup crew:

- Fred Haise (CDR)
- William R. Pogue (CMP)
- Gerald P. Carr (LMP)

For Apollo 20 there is even more uncertainty. Based on normal crew rotation, the crew would likely have been:

- Stuart Roosa (CDR) (replacing Pete Conrad, already CDR on Apollo 12)
- Paul J. Weitz (CMP)
- Jack R. Lousma (LMP)

Another possibility would have been:

- Stuart Roosa or Edgar Mitchell (CDR)
- Jack R. Lousma (CMP)
- Don L. Lind (LMP)

== Skylab ==
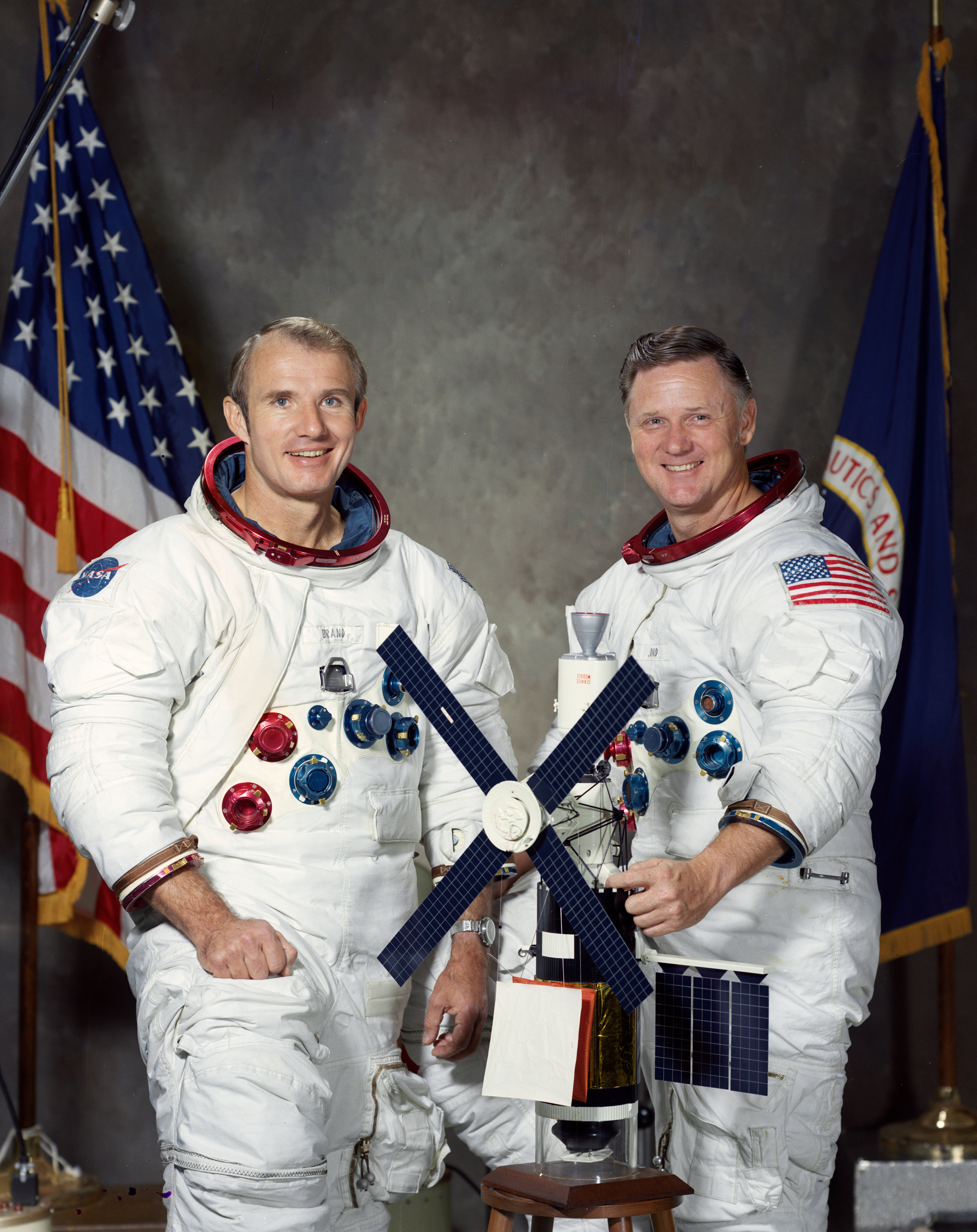
Vance Brand and Don Lind, the crew for the unflown Skylab Rescue mission.

=== Skylab Rescue ===
One of the surplus CSMs, CSM-119, was modified to carry two additional crew and kept on standby for a potential rescue mission in case of issues on-board Skylab. During Skylab 3, a malfunction on the Apollo CSM docked to the station caused fears that the crew would not be able to return safely. CSM-119 was rolled out to Launch Complex 39B on Saturn IB SA-209 during the mission and prepared for a possible launch. Two astronauts, Brand (commander) and Lind (Command Module pilot), would have flown the CSM to retrieve the three crew members. The problem was fixed without requiring a rescue flight. CSM-119 was returned to the Vehicle Assembly Building and remained on standby until the Skylab program ended.

CSM-119 was also held as a backup CSM for the Apollo–Soyuz Test Project.

=== Skylab 5 ===
Skylab 5 would have been a short 20-day mission to conduct more scientific experiments and boost Skylab into a higher orbit. Brand, Lind, and William B. Lenoir (science pilot) would have been the crew.

== Surplus hardware ==
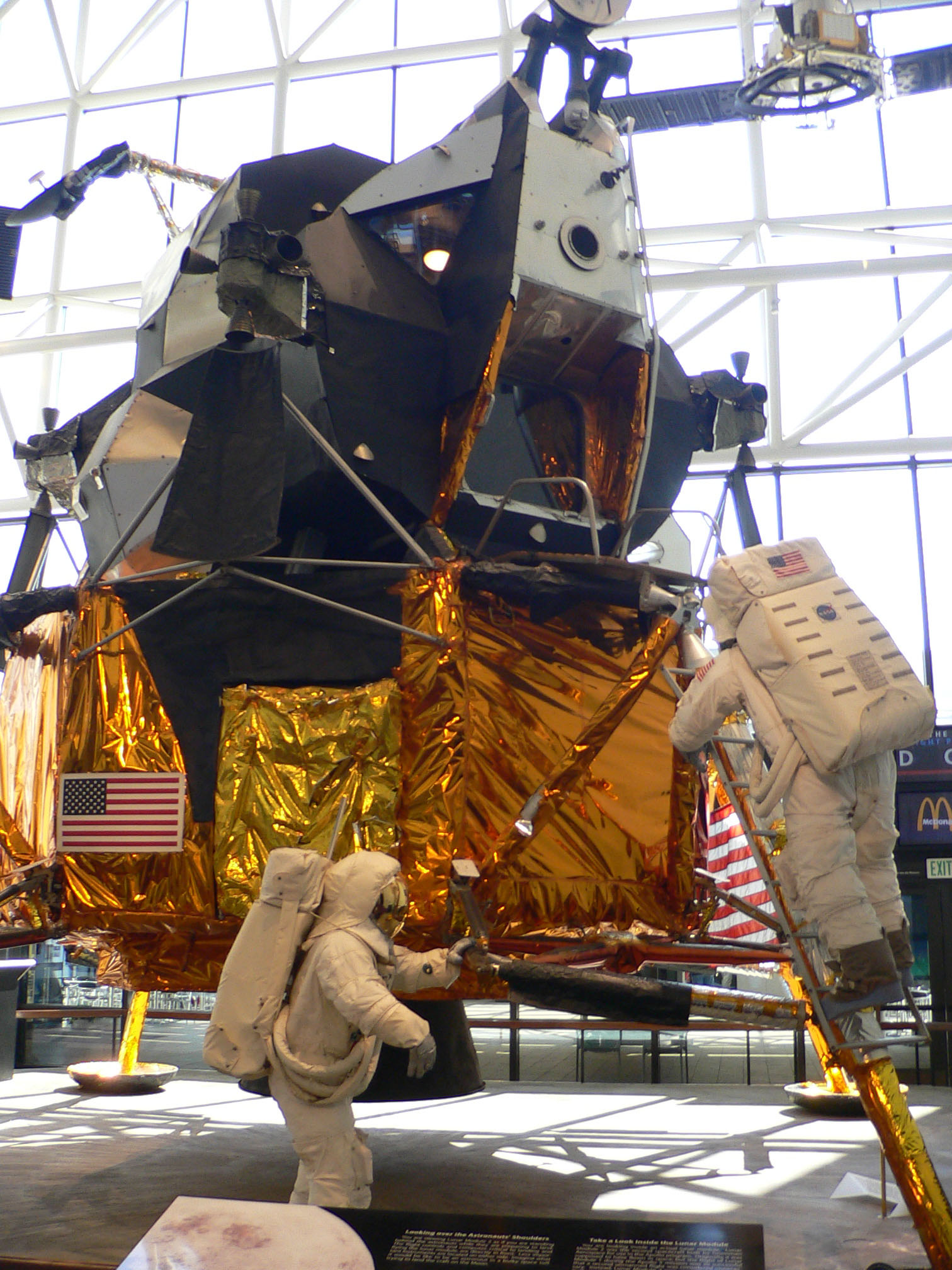
LM-2 on display at the National Air and Space Museum

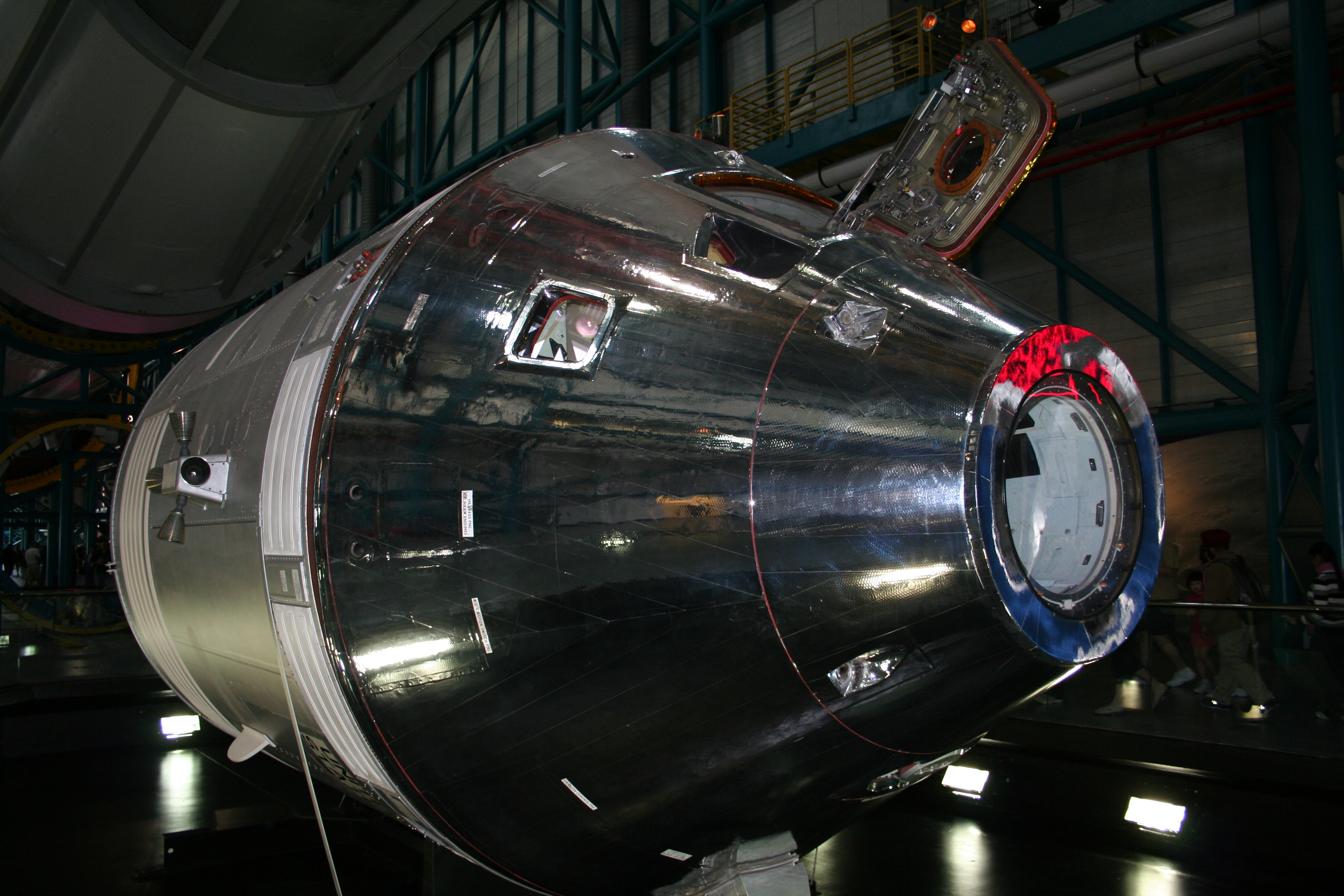
CSM-119 on display at the Apollo/Saturn V Center

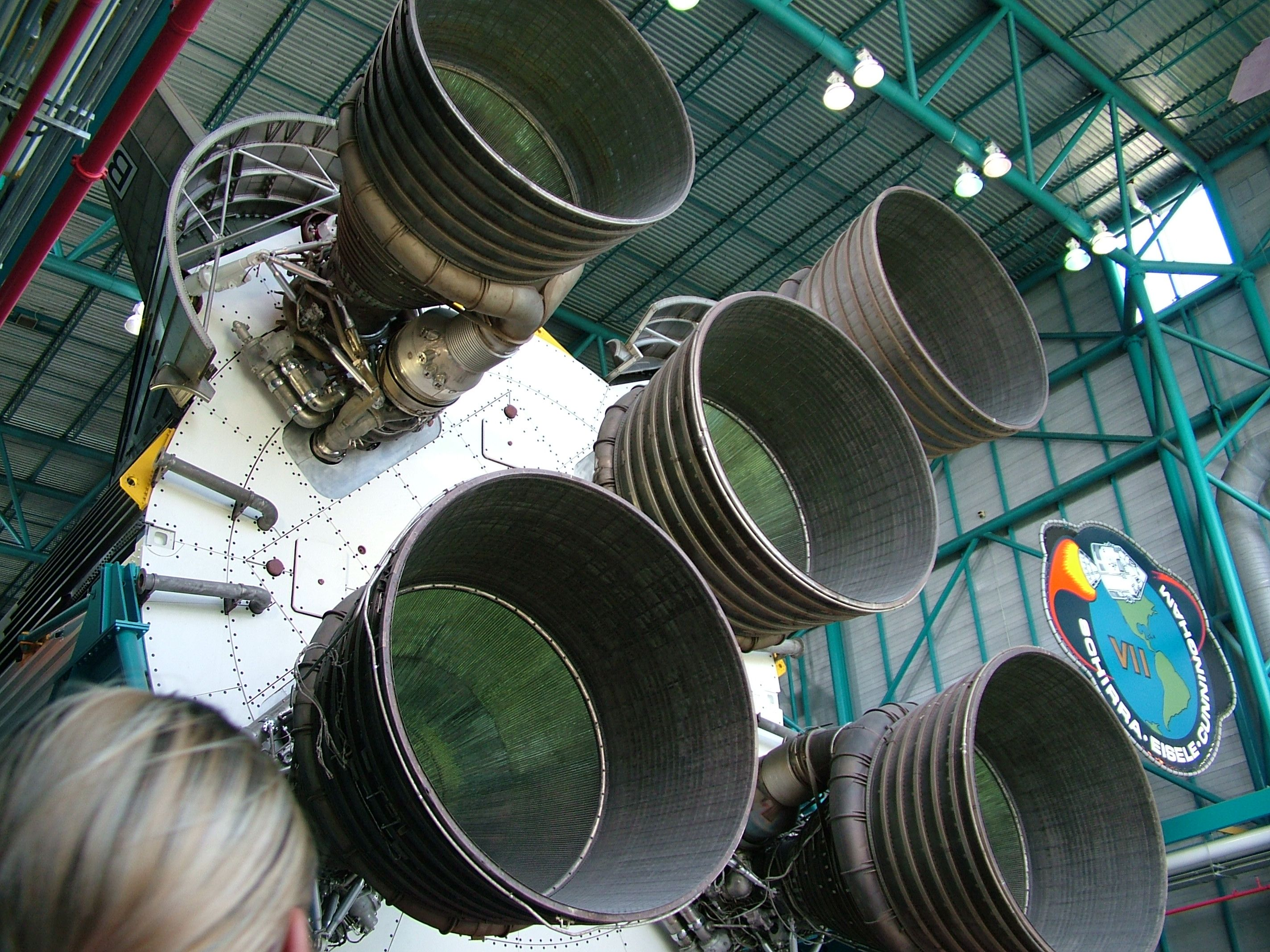
Rear view of Saturn V at the Apollo/Saturn V Center

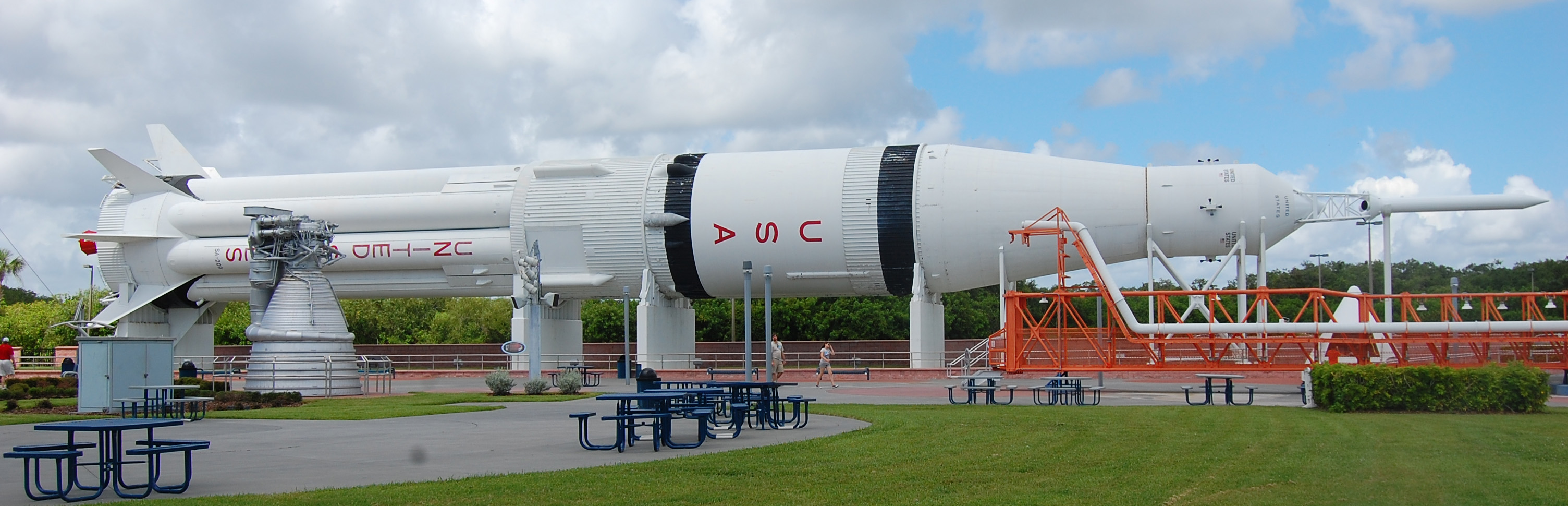
Saturn IB SA-209 on display at the Kennedy Space Center Visitor Complex

Two complete Saturn V rockets went unused after the Apollo program, SA-514 and SA-515, as well as the third stage of the SA-513. SA-513 was the launch vehicle originally planned for the Apollo 18 mission, which was instead used (without its third stage) to launch Skylab.

- A Saturn V on display at the Johnson Space Center in Houston, Texas is made up of the first stage of SA-514, the second stage of SA-515, and the third stage of SA-513. This display includes a production command/service module (CSM-115) which was never completed after funding was cut.
- A Saturn V on display at the Kennedy Space Center Visitor Complex on Merritt Island, Florida is made up of static test stage S-IC-T and the second and third stages of SA-514. The command module associated with the KSC Saturn V display is a boilerplate, BP-30. The stack was originally displayed outdoors in front of the Vehicle Assembly Building and was a stop for tour buses. It was later restored and moved indoors to the Apollo/Saturn V Center.
- The first stage from SA-515 resides at the INFINITY Science Center in Pearlington, Mississippi. The third stage was converted into a backup to the Skylab space station. It is now on display at the National Air and Space Museum.

Several Saturn IBs also remained unused and in storage at the end of the Apollo program. Three (SA-206, SA-207 and SA-208) were used for the crewed launches of the Skylab program, and SA-210 was used for the crewed ASTP flight. The second stage of SA-212 was rebuilt as the launched Skylab. Of the remaining vehicles, two are on display, and the rest were scrapped. Any surplus Rocketdyne H-1 first stage engines were rebranded as the Rocketdyne RS-27 engine for usage on active launch vehicles of the time, such as those of the Delta 2000 Series in 1974.

- The last complete, unflown Saturn IB, SA-209, kept on standby for a possible Skylab Rescue mission, is on display outdoors in the Rocket Garden of the Kennedy Space Center Visitor Complex, topped by an Apollo boilerplate in place of the rescue spacecraft.
- One other surplus Saturn IB (SA-211) was displayed horizontally for a time, until the late 1970s, at the Marshall Spaceflight Center, in Huntsville, Alabama. The second stage of the vehicle (S-IVB-211) was later moved to be combined with the Neutral Buoyancy training components of Skylab at the US Space and Rocket center, minus its J-2 engine. The first stage of SA-211 (S-1B-11) is now displayed vertically at a welcome center on Interstate 65 near Ardmore, Alabama. That vehicle hosts an older ground-test second stage (possibly a battleship stage) SLA adapter and boilerplate Apollo hardware.
- The first stage of SA-212 (S-IB-12) was the last stage to have been static test fired, but was later scrapped, since no further flights were planned. The second stage of SA-212 (S-IVB-212) was converted into the flown, prime Skylab space station.
- The remaining surplus Saturn IB first stages for SA-213 and SA-214 were built, but never static tested, and were also scrapped. No S-IVB second stages were ever built for these two vehicles.

Likewise, the canceled flights' CSMs and LMs went either unused or were used for other missions:

- After Apollo 15's original H mission was canceled, there was a surplus H mission CSM and Lunar Module. CSM-111 was used for the Apollo–Soyuz Test Project (ASTP). LM-9 is on display at the Kennedy Space Center (Apollo/Saturn V Center)
- Apollo 18's CSM and LM were used by Apollo 17.
- Apollo 19's CSM (#115) is displayed on the Saturn V located at the Johnson Space Center. Its LM (LM-13, originally assigned to Apollo 18) was only partially completed by Grumman, and was used as a prop for the 1998 HBO miniseries From the Earth to the Moon in Moon exploration scenes. It is now on display at the Cradle of Aviation Museum on New York's Long Island.
- Apollo 20's CSM was never completed and was scrapped. The LM was also scrapped before completion, though there are some unconfirmed reports that some parts (in addition to parts from the LM test vehicle LTA-3) are included in the LM on display at the Franklin Institute in Philadelphia.
- The Skylab Rescue CSM-119 is on display at the Apollo/Saturn V Center at the Kennedy Space Center Visitor Complex.
