= USS Oklahoma City =

Two vessels of the United States Navy have been named USS Oklahoma City, after Oklahoma City, Oklahoma.

- The first USS Oklahoma City (CLG-5), originally CL-91, was a light cruiser in service from 1945 to 1947, then converted to a guided missile cruiser between 1957 and 1960, continuing in that service until 1979.
- The second USS Oklahoma City (SSN-723) is a Los Angeles-class nuclear attack submarine commissioned in 1988.

== See also ==
- USS Oklahoma
