= USS Oklahoma =

Oklahoma was the name of one ship of the United States Navy and will be the name of a future submarine.

- USS Oklahoma (BB-37), a Nevada-class battleship launched in 1914 and sunk by Japanese bombers in the attack on Pearl Harbor on 7 December 1941.
- USS Oklahoma (SSN-802), a Virginia-class nuclear attack submarine laid down on 2 August 2023.

== See also ==
- USS Oklahoma City
