= Saw (disambiguation) =

A saw is a cutting tool.

Saw or SAW may also refer to:

== Places ==
- Saw Kill (disambiguation), three streams in the U.S. state of New York
- Saw Township, a township in Myanmar (Burma)
  - Saw, Burma, a town in the above township

== People ==
- "Saw Lady", stage name of Natalia Paruz
- U Saw (1900–1948), Burmese Prime Minister
- Samael Aun Weor

== Arts, entertainment, and media ==
=== Films and associated media ===
- Saw (franchise), a horror franchise
  - Saw (film), a 2004 American independent horror film directed by James Wan
  - Saw (soundtrack), a soundtrack album from the 2004 film
  - Saw (video game), a 2009 video game based on the film series
  - Saw: Rebirth, a one-shot comic published by IDW
  - Saw – The Ride, a roller coaster, based on the movie series, at Thorpe Park, England

=== Music ===
==== Instruments and devices ====
- Saw, a Thai family of musical instruments, including:
  - Saw duang
  - Saw sam sai
  - Saw u
- Musical saw, a regular cutting saw used to produce musical sounds

==== Groups and labels ====
- Saw Recordings, a record label
- Stock Aitken Waterman, a British music producing trio

==== Albums ====
- Selected Ambient Works 85–92, 1992 debut album by Richard D. James under the pseudonym Aphex Twin
  - Selected Ambient Works Volume II, 1994

== Science, technology, and mathematics ==
- SAWStudio (Software Audio Workshop), a digital audio workstation
- Self-avoiding walk, a mathematical sequence
- Submerged arc welding
- Surface acoustic wave
  - SAW filter, a type of electronic filter

== Weapons ==
- Squad automatic weapon, or section automatic weapon, light machine gun
  - M249 light machine gun, formerly M249 SAW

== Transportation ==
- SAW, IATA airport code for Sabiha Gökçen International Airport
- SAW, MTR station code for San Wai stop
- SAW, National Rail station code for Sawbridgeworth railway station
- Cham Wings Airlines, a Syrian airline (ICAO designator SAW)

== Other uses ==
- Saw (saying), an old proverb or maxim
- Peace be upon him (Islam), Sallalahu aleyhi wasallam (SAW), an honorific suffix for Muhammad
- Second Automobile Works, of China
- Saw, a character from the fourth season of Battle for Dream Island, an animated web series

== See also ==
- Sau (disambiguation)
- SAWS (disambiguation)
- Sawtooth (disambiguation)
- See (disambiguation)
- Seeing (disambiguation)
- SSAW (disambiguation)
- SSAWS
