= SSAW =

SSAW may refer to:

== Arts, entertainment, media ==
- Bom Yeoreum Gaeul Kyeoul (Korean: 봄여름가을겨울; lit. Spring Summer Autumn Winter), a Korean jazz-rock band
- "ss/aw" ("SSAW"), a 2007 song by Tokyo Jihan off the album Variety

== Science, technology, engineering ==
- Spiral-submerged arc-welded, a type of pipe
- Standing surface acoustic wave, a technique used with acoustic tweezers, tools that use sound waves to manipulate the position and movement of very small objects
- Spread spectrum adaptive wideband (SS-AW), a part of the IEC 61334 standard

== Other uses ==
- Stallionaire Slam Association Wrestling, see Real Chance of Love season 2

== See also ==
- SSAWS (Spring Summer Autumn Winter Snow, pronounced "zaws", ザウス), officially LaLaport Skidome SSAWS (ららぽーとスキードームSSAWS), Funabashi, Chiba, Japan; an indoor ski slope
- SAWS (disambiguation)
- Saw (disambiguation)
