= SAWS =

SAWS may refer to:

- Peace be upon him (Islam), abbreviated as SAWS, phrase that Muslims often say after saying the name of a prophet of Islam
- The San Antonio Water System, a municipally owned water utility in the city of San Antonio, United States.
- State Administration of Work Safety, government agency of the People's Republic of China
- South African Weather Service

== See also ==
- Saus, Catalonia, Spain
- SAW (disambiguation)
- SSAW
- SSAWS
