= Sau =

Sau or SAU may refer to:

== Places ==
- Sau Reservoir, a Catalan water reservoir in the Ter river, named after the town drowned by its creation
- Sau, Manatuto, a suco in Manatuto Administrative Post, Manatuto Municipality, Timor-Leste
- Sao, Kunar, a village in the Kunar Province of Afghanistan where the Sawi language is spoken
- Abbreviation for Saudi Arabia
- A German name for the river Sava

== People ==
- Eroni Sau, Fiji Sevens Rugby Player
- Sau Lan Wu, Chinese American particle physicist

== Universities ==
- Sylhet Agricultural University, in Bangladesh
- Saint Ambrose University, in Iowa, US
- Shenyang Aerospace University in China
- Sher-e-Bangla Agricultural University, in Bangladesh
- Sichuan Agricultural University, in China
- Sindh Agriculture University in Pakistan
- South Asian University, in India
- Southern Adventist University, in the US
- Southern Arkansas University, in the US
- Southern Arkansas University Tech, in the US
- Spring Arbor University, in Michigan, US

== Organisations ==
- Sauti ya Umma, a political party in Tanzania
- Social Affairs Unit, a UK think-tank
- South American Union

== Transport ==
- SAU. the IATA code for Tardamu Airport, East Nusa Tenggara, Indonesia
- SAU, the National Rail code for St Austell railway station, Cornwall, UK

== Other uses ==
- Sau (壽; Cantonese Yale: Sauh), as one of the auspicious Three Star Gods, is revered as the God of Longevity
- Sau (band), a 1990s Catalan pop group
- Sau (Rotuman king), the title of the Rotuman king
- Sau language (disambiguation), several languages

== See also ==
- Saus, Catalonia, Spain
- Saou, a commune in France
- Sao (disambiguation)
- Saw (disambiguation)
