= See (surname) =

See is a surname of English origin. See may refer to:

- Carolyn See (1934–2016), American author
- Clyde See (1941–2017), American lawyer and politician
- Elliot See (1927–1966), American aviator and NASA astronaut
- John See (1844–1907), Premier of New South Wales from 1901 to 1904
- Lisa See (born 1955), American writer and novelist
- Thomas Jefferson Jackson See (1866–1962), American astronomer

== See also ==
- See (disambiguation)
