= Sao =

SAO or Sao may refer to:

== Places ==
- Sao civilisation, in Middle Africa from 6th century BC to 16th century AD
- Sao, a town in Boussé Department, Burkina Faso
- Serb Autonomous Regions (Srpska autonomna oblast, SAO), during the breakup of Yugoslavia

== Science and technology ==
- Smithsonian Astrophysical Observatory of the Smithsonian Institution in Cambridge, Massachusetts, U.S.
  - Smithsonian Astrophysical Observatory Star Catalog, which assigns SAO catalogue entries
- Special Astrophysical Observatory of the Russian Academy of Science (SAO RAS)
- Session-At-Once, a recording mode for optical discs

== Transportation ==
- Saco Transportation Center, a train station in Saco, Maine, U.S., station code SAO
- Sahel Aviation Service, Mali, ICAO airline code SAO
- Airports in Greater São Paulo, Brazil, IATA airport code SAO

== People ==
- Ligi Sao (born 1992), a Samoan rugby league player
- Ron Sao, Western Australian politician

== Other uses ==
- Sao (moon), a satellite of Neptune
- Sao (mythology), a sea nymph in Greek mythology
- Sao, or Thao language, of the Thao people in central Taiwan
- Sao (စဝ်), an honorific in Burmese names
- SAO (biscuit), an Australian savoury cracker
- Chad national football team, nicknamed Les Sao
- Security Advisory Opinion, a U.S. visa decision-making process
- Specified Associated Organisation, of the British Liberal Democrats
- Sword Art Online, a Japanese light novel series, and manga, anime, film and video game adaptations
- Sao hirsuta, a species of trilobite

== See also ==
- Sau (disambiguation)
- Sao Sao Sao, a Thai pop music trio
- São Paulo, the largest city in Brazil
- São Tomé and Príncipe, a country
