= Gemini 9A =

1966 NASA crewed space flight

Gemini IX-A
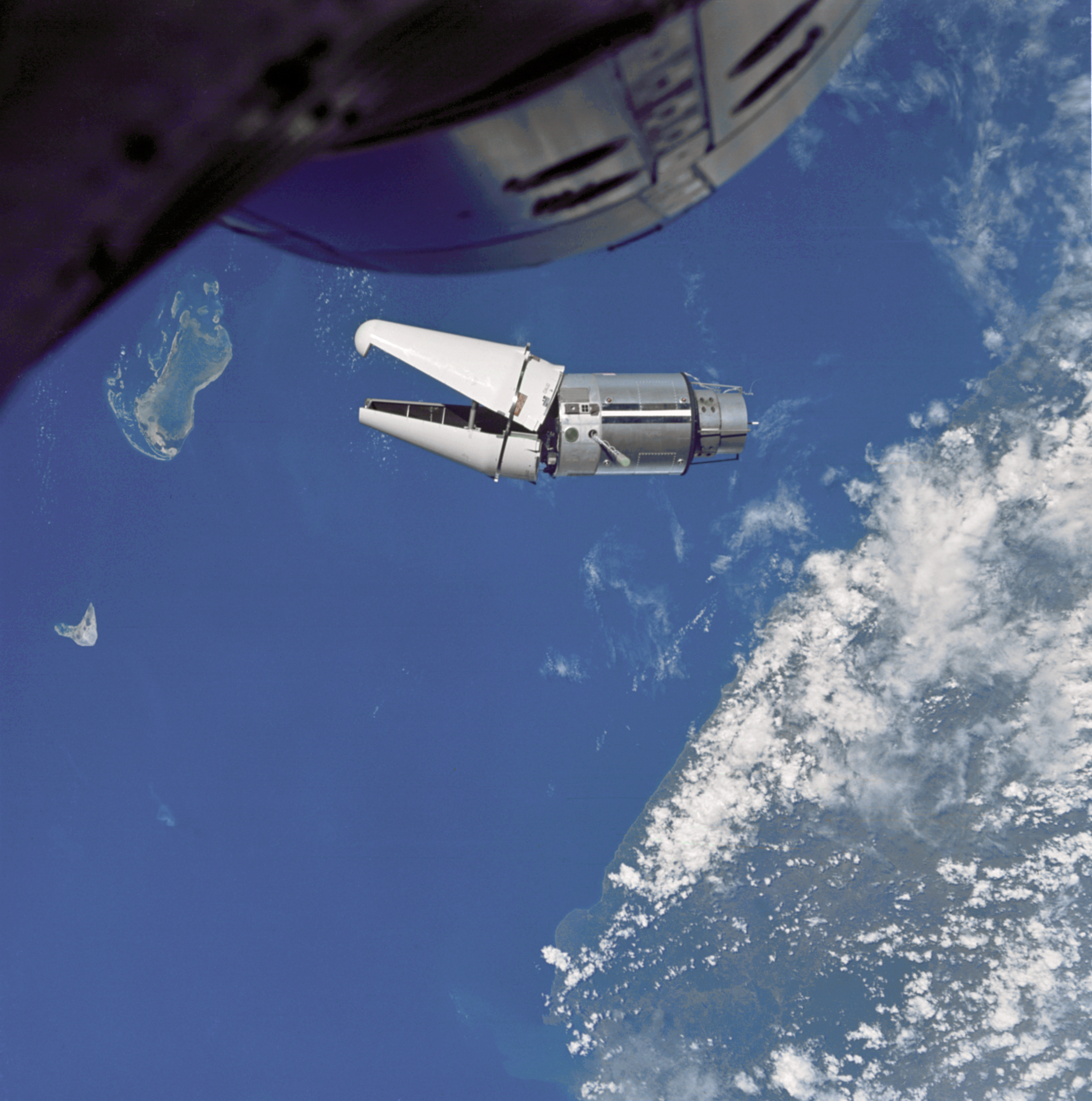
- Gemini IX-A rendezvous with the ATDA, discovering that the docking target's payload fairing has failed to separate
- Mission type: Space rendezvous; Spacecraft docking (failed); Extravehicular activity
- Operator: NASA
- COSPAR ID: 1966-047A
- SATCAT no.: 2191
- Mission duration: 3 days, 20 minutes, 50 seconds
- Orbits completed: 47

Spacecraft properties
- Spacecraft: Gemini SC9
- Manufacturer: McDonnell
- Launch mass: 3,800 kilograms (8,300 lb)

Crew
- Crew size: 2
- Members: Thomas P. Stafford; Eugene A. Cernan
- EVAs: 1
- EVA duration: 2 hours, 7 minutes

Start of mission
- Launch date: June 3, 1966, 13:39:33 UTC
- Rocket: Titan II GLV, s/n #62-12564
- Launch site: Cape Kennedy LC-19

End of mission
- Recovered by: USS Wasp
- Landing date: June 6, 1966, 14:00:23 UTC
- Landing site: 27°52′N 75°0′W

Orbital parameters
- Reference system: Geocentric
- Regime: Low Earth orbit
- Perigee altitude: 272 kilometers (147 nmi)
- Apogee altitude: 274 kilometers (148 nmi)
- Inclination: 28.8 degrees
- Period: 89.97 minutes
- Epoch: June 6, 1966
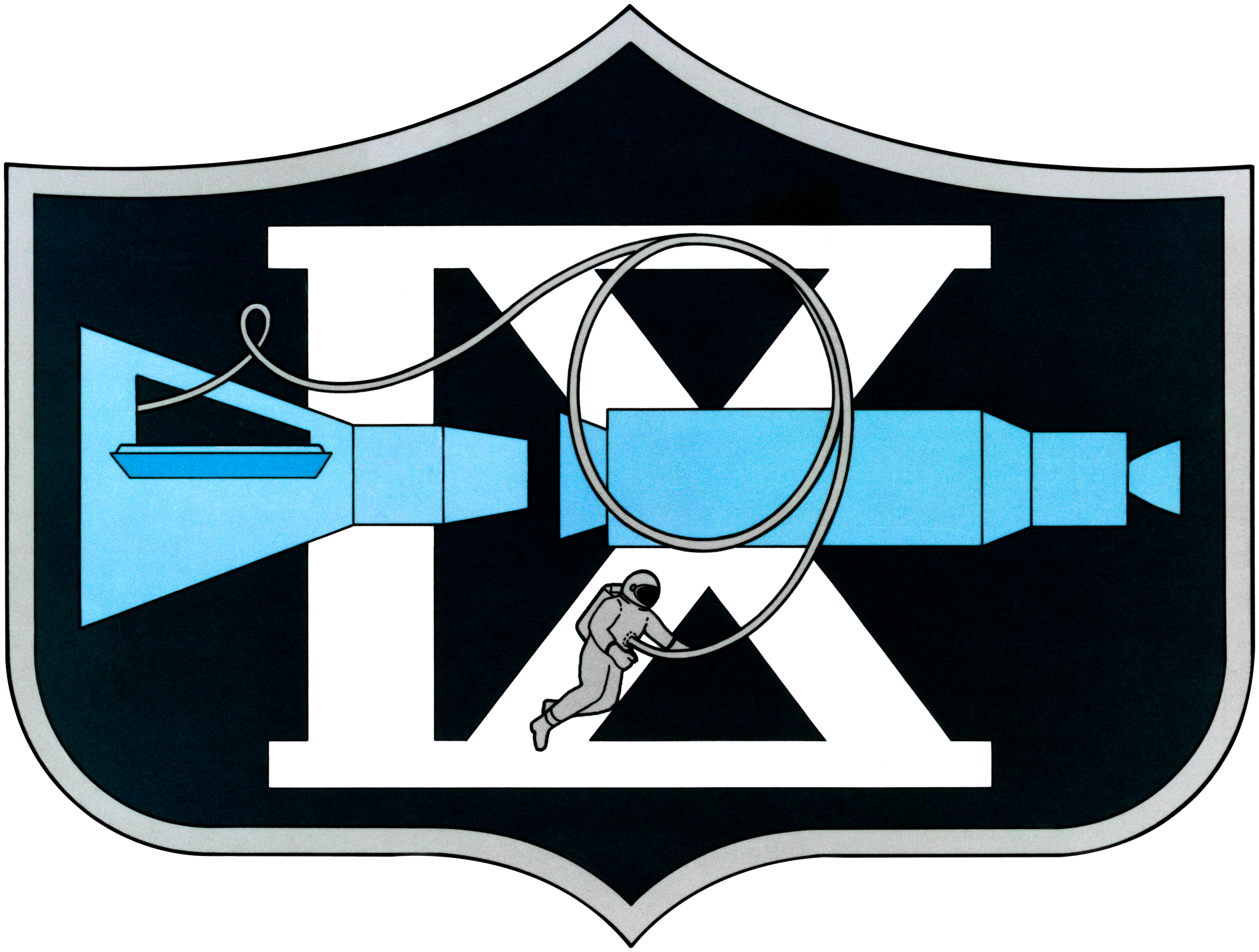
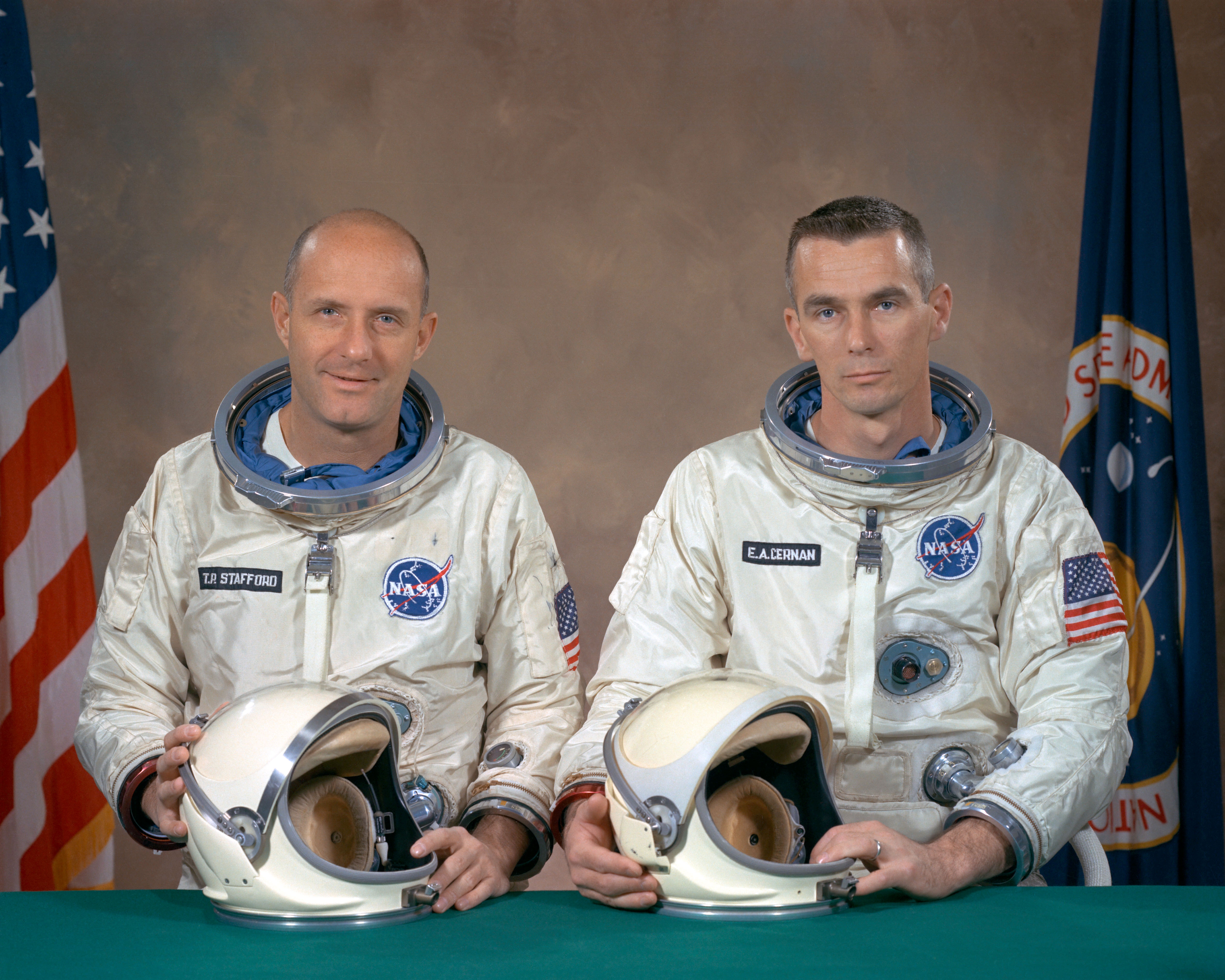
- (L-R) Stafford, Cernan Project Gemini

Gemini 9A (officially Gemini IX-A) was a 1966 crewed spaceflight in NASA's Gemini program. It was the seventh crewed Gemini flight, the 15th crewed American flight and the 23rd spaceflight of all time (includes X-15 flights over 100 kilometers (62 mi; 54 nmi)). The original crew for Gemini 9, command pilot Elliot See and pilot Charles Bassett, were killed in a crash on February 28, 1966, while flying a T-38 jet trainer to the McDonnell Aircraft plant in St. Louis, Missouri to inspect their spacecraft. Their deaths promoted the backup crew, Thomas P. Stafford and Eugene Cernan, to the prime crew. The mission was renamed Gemini 9A after the original May 17 launch was scrubbed when the mission's Agena Target Vehicle was destroyed after a launch failure. The mission was flown June 3–6, 1966, after launch of the backup Augmented Target Docking Adaptor (ATDA). Stafford and Cernan rendezvoused with the ATDA, but were unable to dock with it because the nose fairing had failed to eject from the docking target due to a launch preparation error. Cernan performed a two-hour extravehicular activity, during which it was planned for him to demonstrate free flight in a self-contained rocket pack, the USAF Astronaut Maneuvering Unit. He was unable to accomplish this due to stress, fatigue, and overheating.

== Crew ==
=== Original prime crew ===
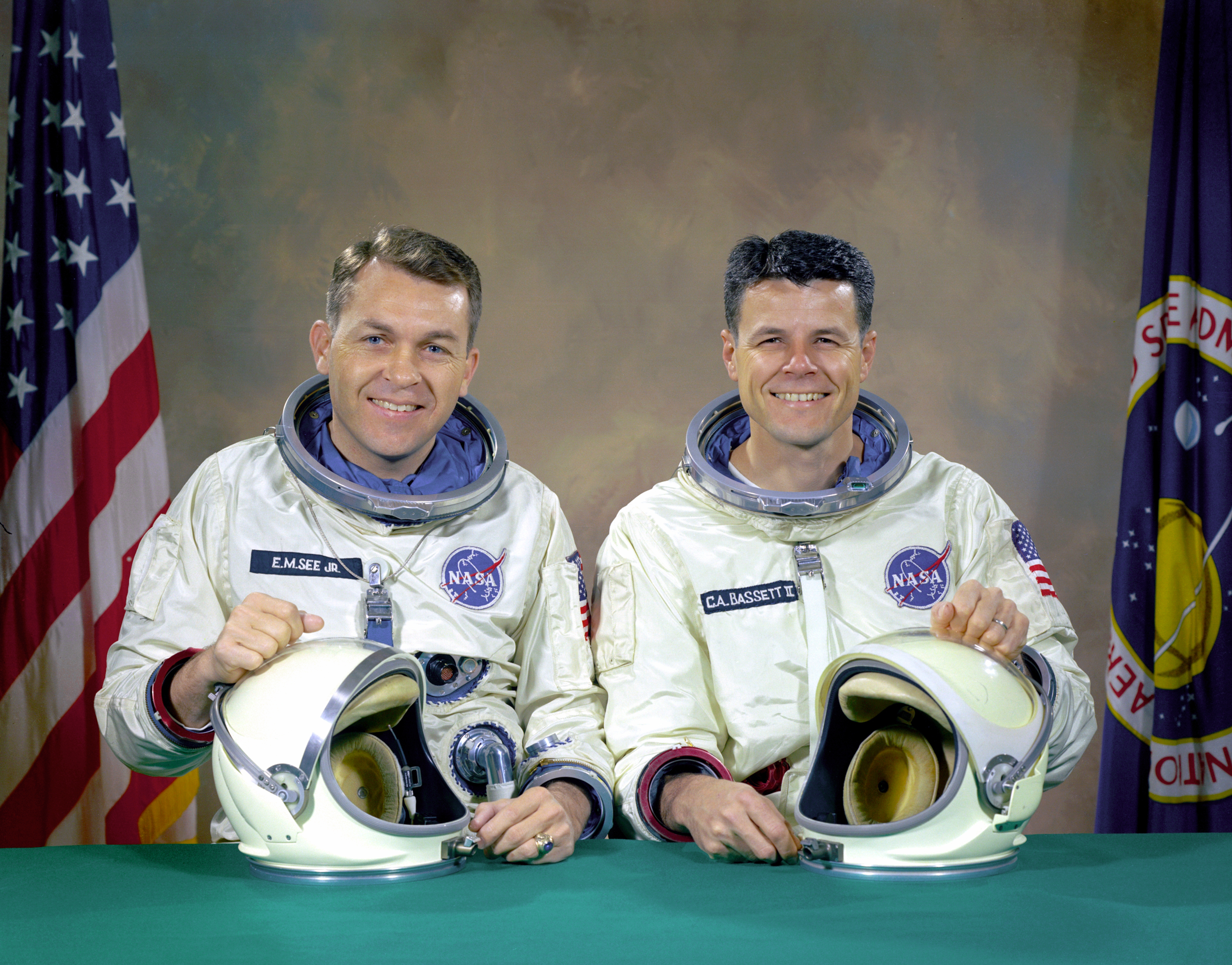
The original prime crew of Gemini 9 – Elliot See and Charles Bassett

Position	Astronaut
Command Pilot	Elliot M. See Jr. Would have been first spaceflight
Pilot	Charles A. Bassett II; Would have been first spaceflight
Crew died in plane crash four months before launch

On February 28, 1966, See and Bassett were flying from Texas to inspect the Gemini 9 spacecraft at the McDonnell Aircraft plant in St. Louis, Missouri. The conditions at Lambert Field were poor and, as a consequence, in attempting a visual approach and landing, See hit one of the assembly buildings of the factory and caused the aircraft to crash, killing himself and Bassett instantly. As a consequence, the backup crew was promoted to prime crew, the first time this had occurred since the flight of Mercury-Atlas 7 in 1962.

=== Original backup crew and new prime crew ===
Position	Astronaut
Command Pilot	Thomas P. Stafford; Second spaceflight
Pilot	Eugene A. Cernan; First spaceflight
Originally backup crew Assigned to fly after deaths of original prime crew

=== New backup crew ===
Position	Astronaut
Command Pilot	James A. Lovell Jr
Pilot	Edwin E. "Buzz" Aldrin Jr.
This would later become the prime crew on Gemini 12

The promotion of Stafford and Cernan from backup to prime crew meant that a new backup crew was required. Jim Lovell and Buzz Aldrin were originally the backup crew for Gemini 10. This is significant as the standard crew rotation meant that a spot on the backup crew of Gemini 10 would have placed Buzz Aldrin on the prime crew of the non-existent mission after Gemini 12 (the crew rotation usually meant that after serving on a backup crew, an astronaut could expect to skip two missions and then be on a prime crew). Being moved up to the backup crew of Gemini 9 meant that Aldrin flew as part of the prime crew on Gemini 12, which played a major part in his selection for the Apollo 8 backup and Apollo 11 prime crews, ultimately making him the second human on the Moon.

== Mission parameters ==
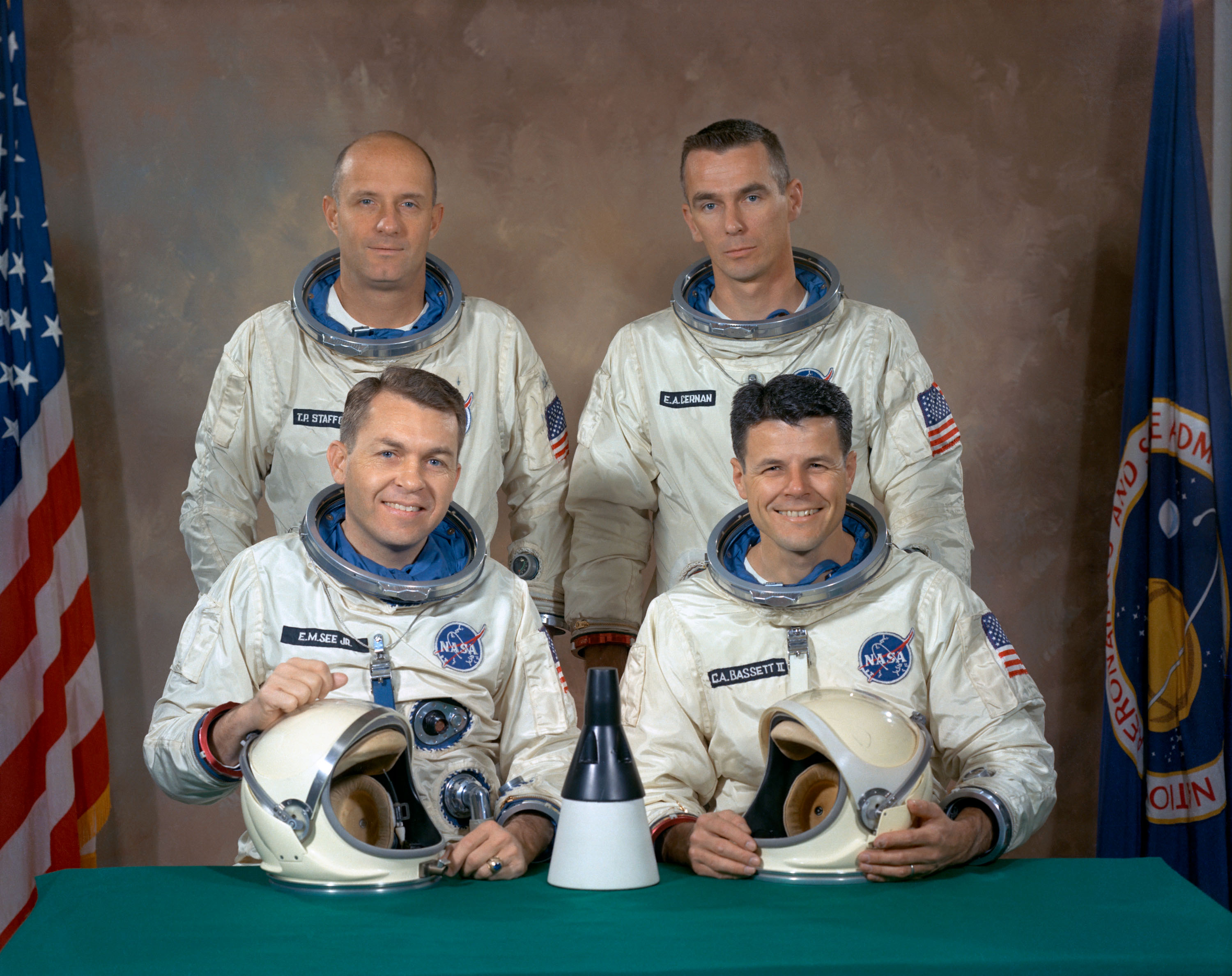
Gemini 9 original prime crew (front row, L-R) Elliott See, Charles Bassett; and backup crew (back row, L-R) Tom Stafford, Gene Cernan

- Mass: 3,750 kilograms (8,270 lb)
- Perigee: 158.8 kilometers (98.7 mi; 85.7 nmi) at launch
- Apogee: 266.9 kilometers (165.8 mi; 144.1 nmi) at launch
- Inclination: 28.91°
- Period: 88.78 min

=== First rendezvous ===
- June 3, 1966 – 17:45 – 18:00 UTC

=== Spacewalk ===
- Cernan
  - Start: June 5, 1966, 15:02:00 UTC
  - End: June 5, 1966, 17:09:00 UTC
  - Duration: 2 hours and 7 minutes

== Objectives ==
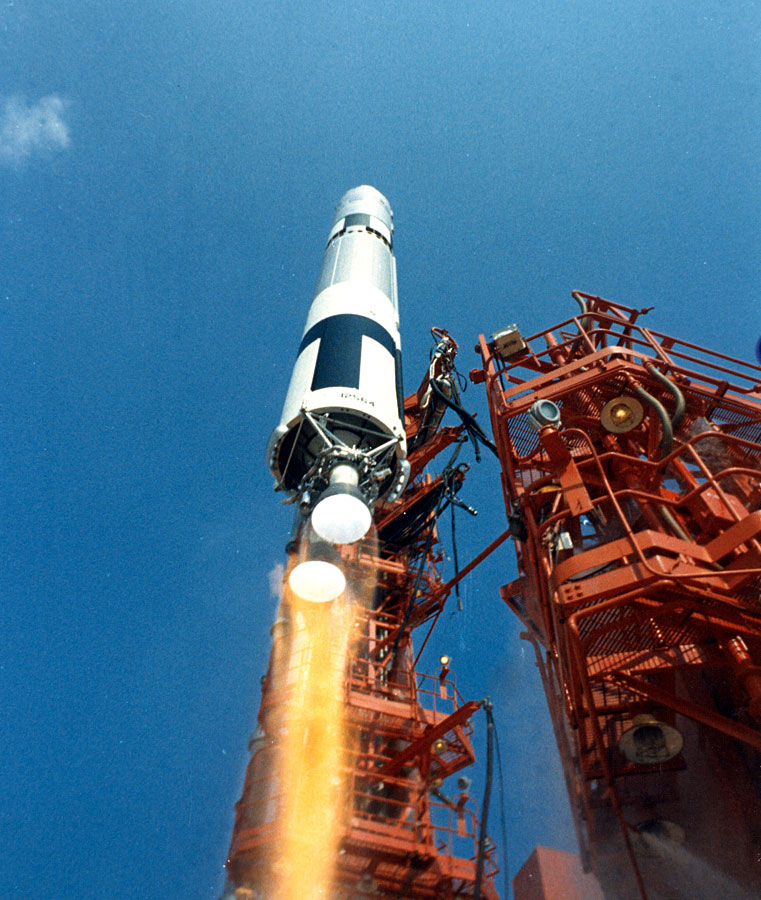
Gemini 9A launch from LC-19

The first mission objective was to dock with an Agena Target Vehicle, as had first been achieved on the Gemini 8 mission. Accomplishment was not possible because of a launch preparation error on the target vehicle.

A second objective was a planned extravehicular activity (EVA), or "space walk", by the right-hand seat Pilot. The plan was for him to move to the rear of the spacecraft and strap himself into the Air Force's Astronaut Maneuvering Unit (AMU), a 'rocket pack' which would allow the pilot controlled flight, independent of the capsule's life support system. Use of the AMU was not achieved due to Cernan experiencing high cardiac stress, overheating, and fatigue during EVA.

A third objective was to carry out seven scientific experiments, including a medical experiment which measured the astronauts' reactions to stress by measuring the intake and output of fluids before, during and after the flight.

== Flight ==
Attempt	Planned	Result	Turnaround	Reason	Decision point	Weather go (%)	Notes
1	17 May 1966, 12:39:00 pm	Scrubbed	—	Technical	17 May 1966, 11:23 am		Failure of Agena Target vehicle to reach orbit. Mission redesignated as Gemini 9A.
2	1 Jun 1966, 12:38:00 pm	Scrubbed	14 days 23 hours 59 minutes	Technical	1 Jun 1966, 12:39 pm (T−00:03:00)		Ground computer malfunction.
3	3 Jun 1966, 9:39:33 am	Success	1 day 21 hours 2 minutes				

=== Target vehicle launch ===
	Gemini 9A Target Vehicles
Agena	GATV-5004
Mass	3,252 kilograms (7,169 lb)
Launch site	LC-14
Launch date	May 17, 1966
Launch time	15:12 UTC
Destroyed	15:19 UTC
ATDA	#02186
NSSDC ID:	1966-046A
Mass	794 kilograms (1,750 lb)
Launch site	LC-14
Launch date	June 1, 1966
Launch time	15:00:02 UTC
1st perigee	298.4 kilometers (185.4 mi)
1st apogee	309.7 kilometers (192.4 mi)
Period	90.5 min
Inclination	28.87
Reentered	June 11, 1966

Gemini 9's Agena Target Vehicle (ATV) was launched on May 17, 1966, on an Atlas launch vehicle. The Atlas malfunctioned in flight and the ATV failed to reach orbit. This forced the cancellation of the Gemini 9 launch scheduled for later that morning.

The Augmented Target Docking Adapter (ATDA) had been designed for use as a contingency for the ATV, which had failed during the original Gemini 6 launch. Built by Gemini spacecraft manufacturer McDonnell Aircraft Corporation, the ATDA replaced the Agena rocket with the reentry control section of a Gemini. It was built using already tested equipment, and successfully launched on June 1, 1966, into a 298-kilometer (185 mi; 161 nmi) orbit using the Atlas SLV-3 rocket.

Because the ATDA had no propulsion system of its own, the launch necessitated an extended Atlas sustainer burn—while SECO would normally take place at T+300 seconds, it was extended to T+348 seconds. A sustainer burn this long had never been attempted in almost 300 Atlas launches to date—a double-sized lubricant oil tank was used to ensure enough oil for turbopump operation. The experiment worked and sustainer performance during the extended burn phase was uneventful. The vernier solo phase lasted another 18 seconds and ATDA separation occurred at T+383 seconds.

After launch, telemetry indicated that the launch shroud had failed to open properly.

=== Gemini spacecraft launch ===
Replanning the mission to accommodate the May 17 ATV failure forced the redesignation of the Gemini mission as Gemini 9A, the same as had happened to the original Gemini 6 mission on October 25, 1965. The first launch attempt was scheduled to occur shortly after the ATDA launch. But at T−3 minutes, the ground computers lost contact with the Gemini computers for an unknown reason, and the 40 second launch window opened and closed without launch. This earned Tom Stafford the title of "Mayor of Pad 19".

The second launch attempt on June 3 went perfectly, with the spacecraft entering into orbit. With this launch, Stafford could say that he had been strapped into a Gemini spacecraft six times for only 2 launches.

Launch vehicle performance was very close to nominal. Two small roll transients were evident at liftoff and pogo effects were the lowest yet recorded on a Gemini launch.

=== Rendezvous ===
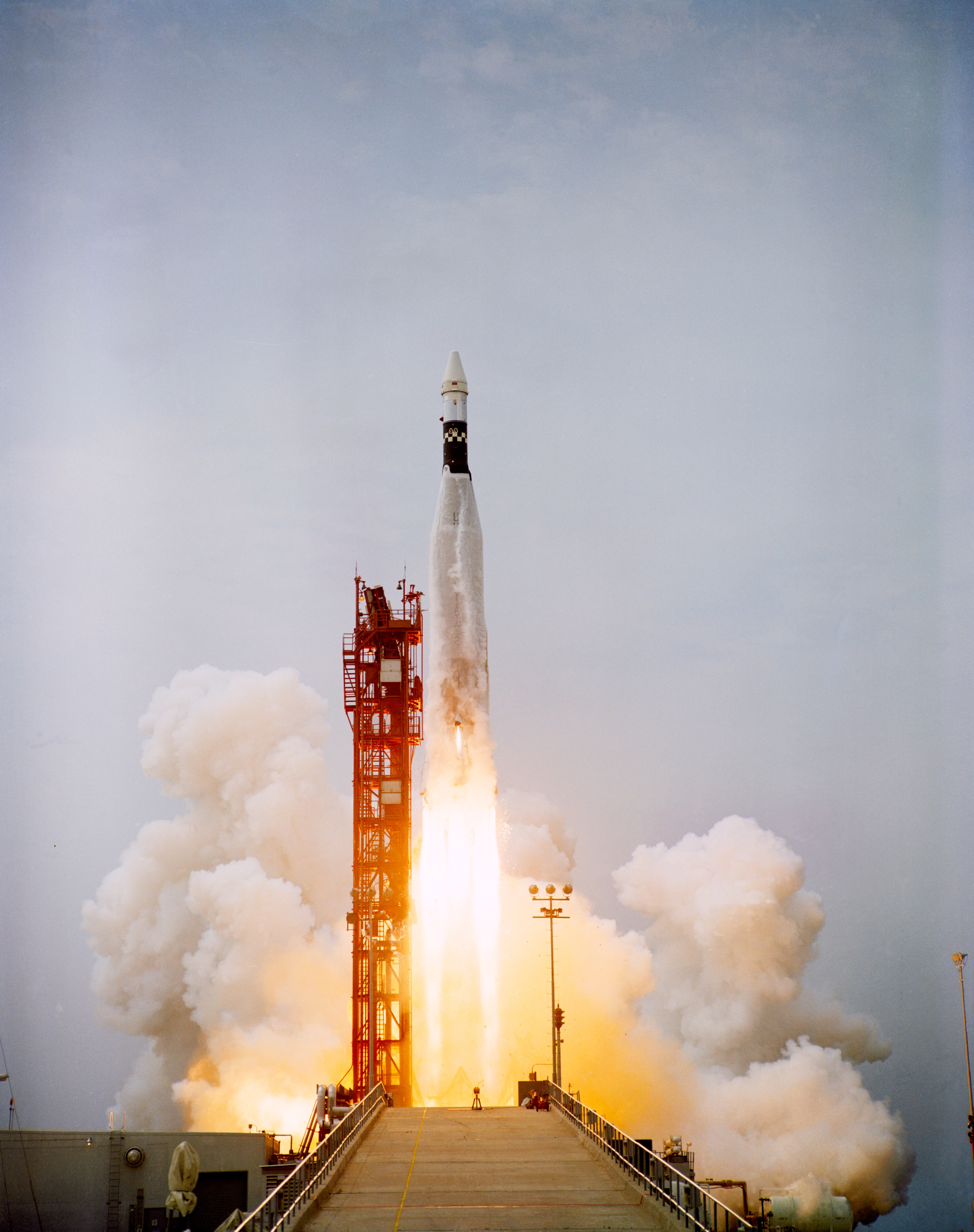
The ATDA is launched from Cape Kennedy's Pad 14 atop an Atlas launch vehicle at 10 a.m., June 1, 1966.

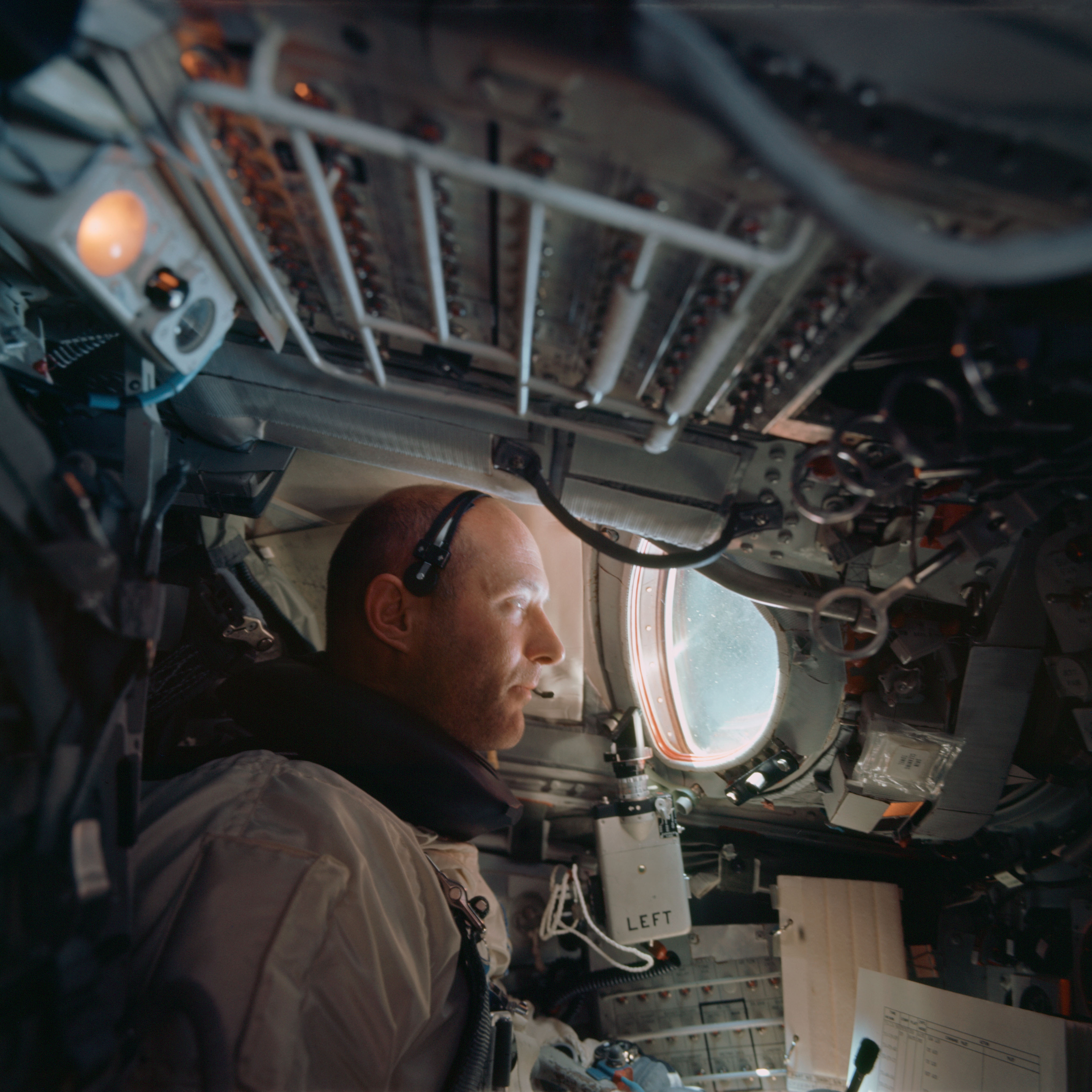
Tom Stafford inside the Gemini spacecraft

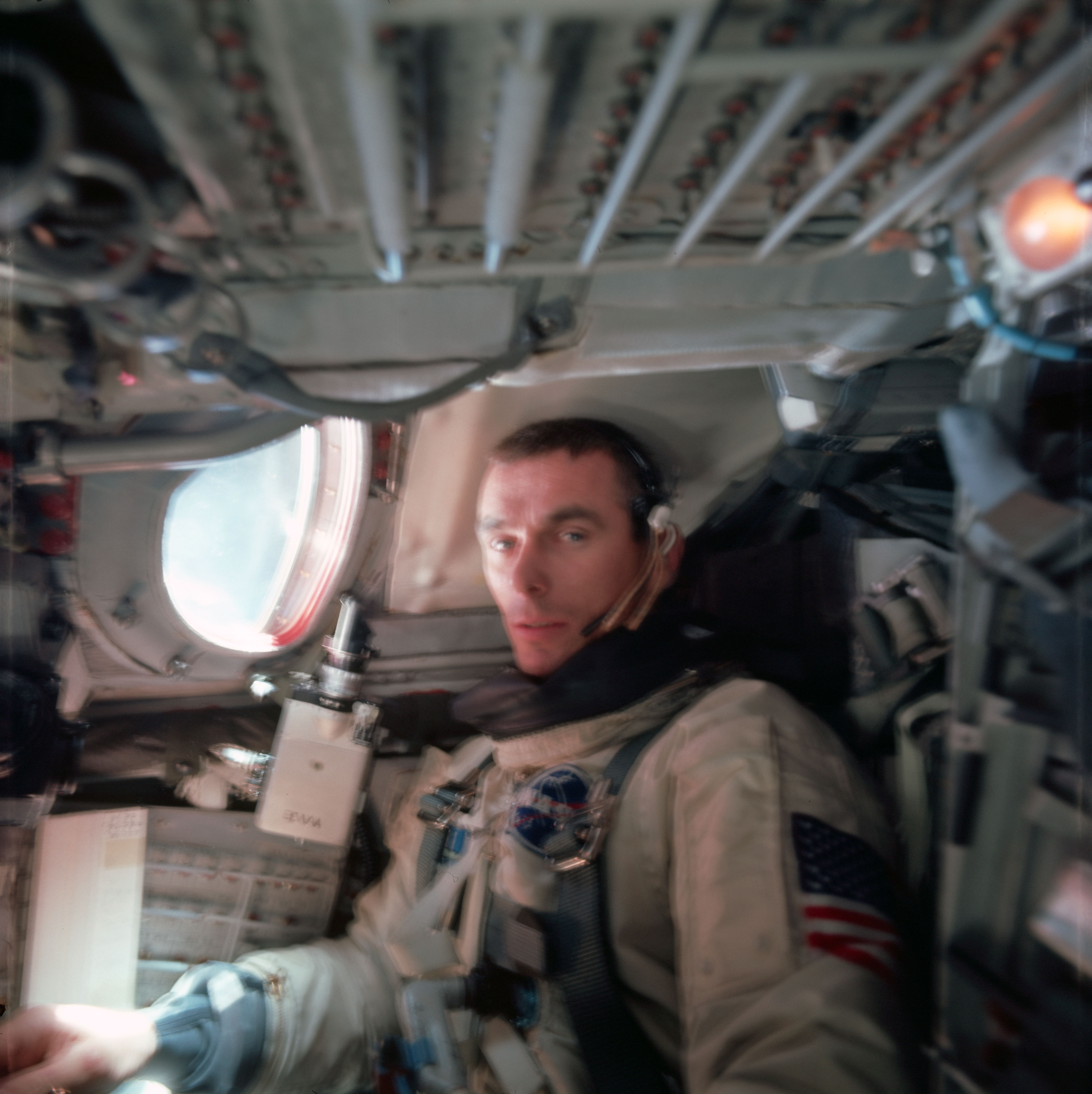
Gene Cernan inside the Gemini spacecraft

Stafford made the first thruster burn 49 minutes after launch, to add 22.7 meters per second (74 ft/s) to their speed, raising their perigee from 160 to 232 kilometers (99 to 144 mi; 86 to 125 nmi). An hour and 35 minutes later, Stafford corrected phase, height, and out-of-plane errors by pointing the spacecraft 40° down, and 3° to the left. Fifty-one seconds later, he fired the thrusters again to add 16.2 meters per second (53 ft/s) to their speed and put them into a 274-by-276-kilometer (170 by 171 mi; 148 by 149 nmi) orbit, closing at 38 meters per second (120 ft/s) on the ATDA.

The first radar contact with the target registered a distance of 240 kilometers (150 mi) away and they had a solid lock at 222 kilometers (138 mi). Their first visual sighting came 3 hours and 20 minutes into the mission, when they were 93 kilometers (58 mi) away. They noted that they could see the flashing strobe lights on the ATDA, designed to aid identification from a distance. This made them hope that the launch shroud had in fact been jettisoned and that the telemetry was wrong.

As they got closer, they found the ATDA to be in a slow rotation, with the conical nose shroud still attached, the two pieces hanging agape at the front like a giant, open jaw. Stafford described "It looks like an angry alligator out here rotating around". He asked if maybe he could use the spacecraft to open the 'jaws' but the ground decided against it, fearing this might cause damage to the spacecraft.

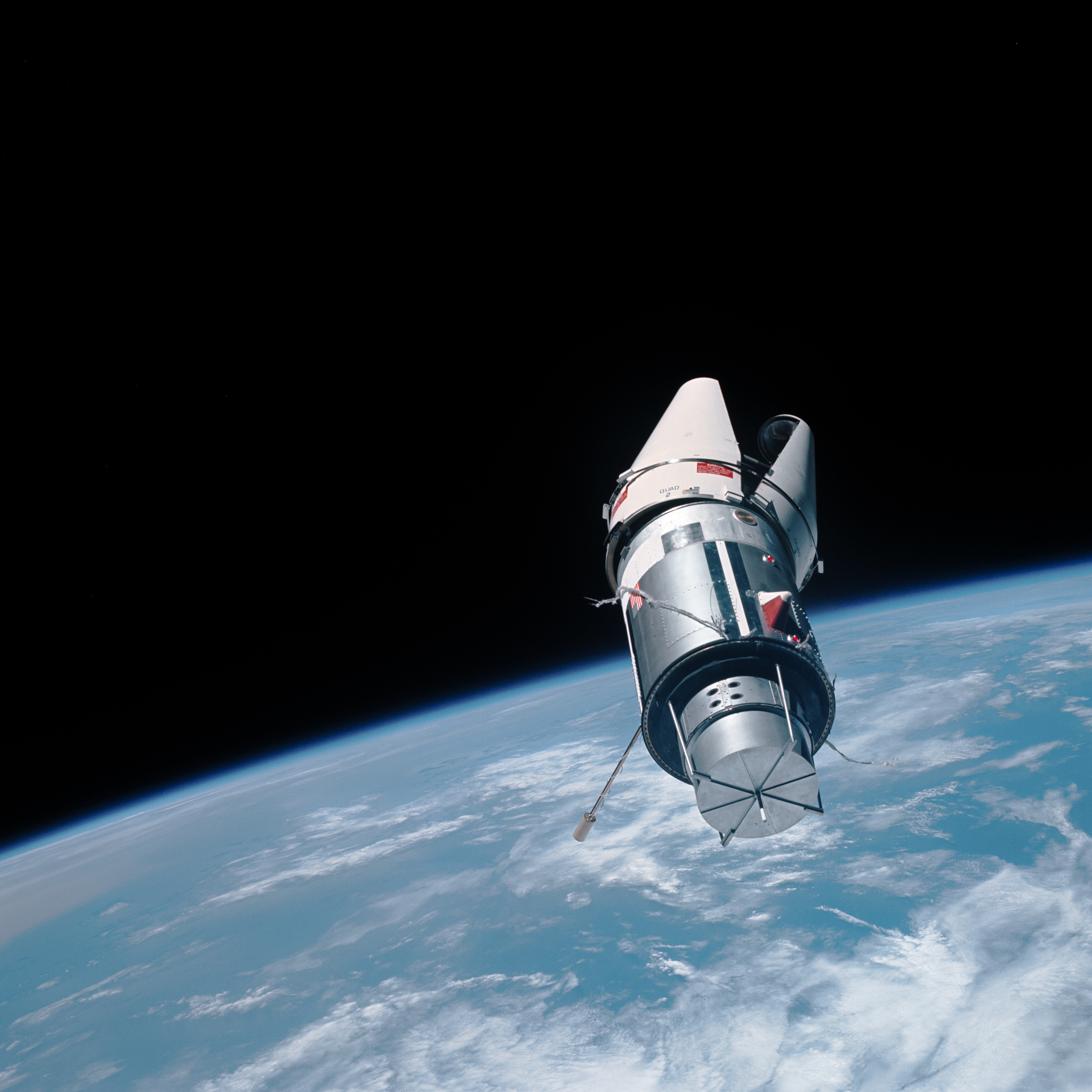
ATDA, with its payload fairing still attached, as seen from Gemini 9

The crew described how the shroud's explosive bolts had fired but, because the quick disconnect lanyards that were designed to unlock the electrical connectors to the explosive bolts had not been hooked up, the electrical wiring to the bolts held the two 1 1/2-inch wide steel shroud retaining bands together. If the electrical wires were cut on one side of the shroud, the two steel bands would immediately straighten and, being still held together by the wires on the opposite side of the shroud, it was difficult to predict the path of the released bands. Their ability to rip open a space suit like a razor blade caused the salvage mission to be abandoned. At the Cape, backup pilot Buzz Aldrin suggested that Cernan cut the electric wires with surgical scissors from the equipment pack. An experiment on the ground demonstrated this could indeed slice the wires, but also showed the ATDA bristled with dangerous, sharp edges. Ground controllers were, in Deke Slayton's words, "just aghast" at the idea, which did not take into consideration the substantial risks of the energy in the released shroud retaining bands holding the shroud halves together, the constant spinning of the ATDA, or the fact that the released shroud retaining bands might whip back and puncture Cernan's spacesuit.

The reason for the lanyards' condition was soon discovered: Douglas built the shroud to be attached to the Agena second stage, but the Air Force decided at the last minute that Atlas could achieve the desired orbit without NASA's second stage. This dropped NASA out of the launch and meant that the ATDA and fairing would be installed directly on Atlas—not Agena—and by a McDonnell crew instead of the normal Lockheed crew.

NASA had contracted the Douglas engineer to witness, inspect and sign off on the fairing installation on the Agena second stage, but because Agena would not be used, McDonnell personnel would now install the fairing with which they were unfamiliar and they refused to permit the Douglas engineer on the gantry, over the protests of the engineer and NASA personnel, saying that it was a simple structure and they did not need any help. On launch day, the McDonnell crew followed procedures published by Lockheed, which had been copied from Douglas documents. The instructions said, "See blueprint," but the Lockheed drawing was not used. The Douglas technician who normally hooked up the lanyards knew what to do with the loose ends, even without the blueprint, but he was not permitted on the gantry. The strangers fixing the ATDA's shroud looked at the dangling straps, wondered what to do with them, and taped them under the small fairings that protected the explosive bolts. After the launch, the Douglas engineer, with the help of Lockheed, set up a backup fairing and demonstrated the problem to McDonnell personnel and to George Mueller, NASA's Office of Manned Space Flight administrator.

The crew then did some planned rendezvous practice that involved them moving away from the ATDA by firing their thrusters and then practicing approaching from below the target. They then got some much needed food and rest.

During the flight, neither astronaut had much time to eat due to the busy schedule or to document their food consumption, so it could not be determined how much of the difficulties Cernan experienced during the EVA were due to insufficient caloric intake. Approximately half the food supply was eaten and the crew did not register any complaints about its quality during postflight debriefings.

On the second day of the mission, they again approached the ATDA, this time from above. Once they were stationkeeping alongside, they were given permission for their EVA, but they were tired and Stafford did not want to waste fuel keeping himself near the ATDA during the EVA when there was little they could do with it. It was decided to postpone the EVA until the third day.

=== EVA ===
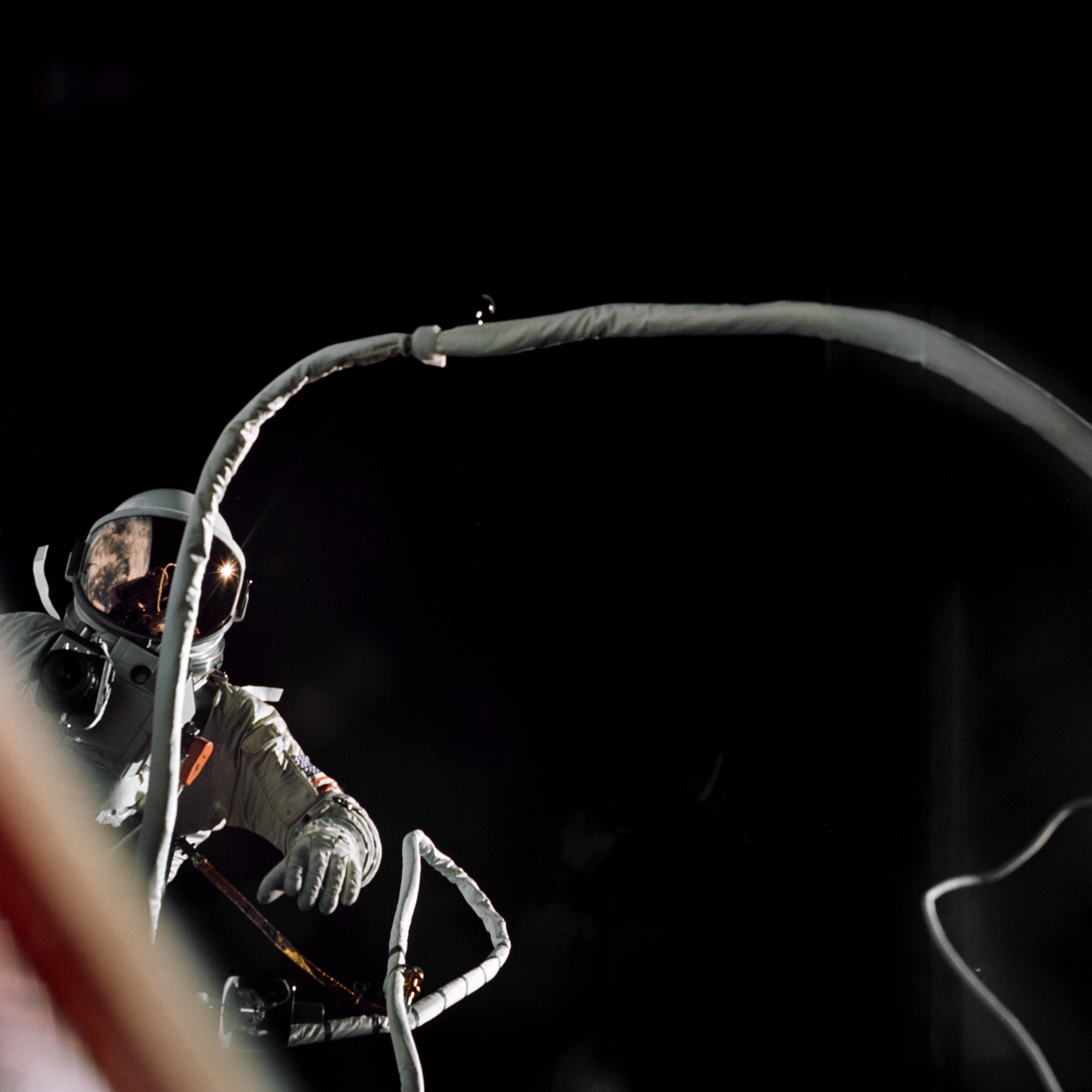
Astronaut Eugene Cernan during EVA

On the third day, Cernan began the EVA, which proved to be troubled from the start. After pumping up his pressure suit to 3.5 pounds per square inch (24 kPa), "the suit took on a life of its own and became so stiff that it didn't want to bend at all." He struggled to move inside his stiff suit. As soon as he left the spacecraft, he began tumbling uncontrollably, which was not helped by his umbilical which moved wildly and gave Cernan difficulty in controlling his movements. He eventually made it back to the hatch area.

Cernan was scheduled to test the Astronaut Maneuvering Unit (AMU), with its own propulsion, stabilization system, oxygen and telemetry for biomedical data and systems. It used hydrogen peroxide for propellant, and because it produced extremely hot gases, Cernan's spacesuit was modified with "pants" made of woven nickel alloy "Chromel-R," which was later used on the gloves and Moon walking boots on Apollo spacesuits. This material was developed by the Air Force Systems Command for use in high-temperature deceleration devices for aerospace systems.

Cernan began the slow climb to the rear of the spacecraft, where the AMU was stored. While he was disconnecting himself from the capsule umbilical and hooking up to the backpack, his heart rate rose to about 155 beats per minute (bpm). He later described his spacesuit as having "all the flexibility of a rusty suit of armor", which made everything take much longer than expected. The lack of hand and foot holds made him unable to gain any leverage, which made it hard to turn valves or even to perform basic movements. While making the connections, Cernan became very tired. His pulse soared to about 180 bpm and the flight surgeon on the ground feared he would lose consciousness. As he sweated, his visor began to fog. He rubbed his nose against the visor to clear a spot so he could see. After making all the necessary connections, Cernan rested for a few minutes while Mission Control decided whether or not to proceed with the AMU test.

At this point Cernan decided that there was considerable risk in continuing the EVA. He had poor visibility from within his spacesuit and could not move very well. He would have to disconnect himself from the umbilical that attached him to the Gemini (though would still be attached by a longer thinner lead), after he had connected himself to the AMU. But when he had finished with the AMU he would somehow have to remove it with one hand, while the other held onto the spacecraft. Cernan, while physically exhausted, wanted to proceed, but Stafford called an end to the task and ordered Cernan back inside before he could fly the AMU. He managed to move himself back to the cockpit and Stafford held onto Cernan's legs to let him rest and assist him in getting back inside. After trying to remove a mirror mounted to the side of the spacecraft, his suit cooling system overheated and his face plate fogged up completely, blocking his vision. Cernan also felt excruciating pain as he moved back into his seat, as his suit was still fully pressurized and he had to move down far enough for the hatch to close. He and Stafford managed to get the hatch closed and the cabin repressurized. Cernan had spent 128 minutes outside the spacecraft.

The Gemini spacesuit was air-cooled. As an astronaut's work load increased, he would begin to sweat, and within the confined suit the cooling system would be overwhelmed and the visor would fog. The astronaut would then be effectively blind because he had no way to wipe off the faceplate. In future Gemini EVAs, the work load of the astronauts was reduced, but it was clear that during lunar exploration, workloads could be heavy and changes were made by ensuring that the Apollo EVA suit were water cooled. This was accomplished with an astronaut undergarment having a network of thin tubes that circulated water near the skin. It was very effective and there were very few cases where astronauts used the "High" Cooling selection, even though they were working hard on the Moon's surface in 100 °C (212 °F) sunlight.

The EVA suit did not have any temperature probes; they had been removed to make room for additional extravehicular life support system (ELSS) equipment, thus no EVA temperature data from inside the suit was available—Cernan reported that the back of his suit was very hot. Postflight examination found a tear in the suit insulation which could have allowed high temperature buildups.

Stafford said in a 1999 interview that there was a real concern that Cernan would not be able to re-enter the capsule. Since it would not have been acceptable for Stafford to cut Cernan loose in orbit, he stated that his plan was to make re-entry with the astronaut still attached by his umbilical. However, such an action would have resulted in the deaths of both men.

As a result of Cernan's experience, the AMU never again flew on Gemini. It was not essential to developing technology for the Apollo Moon landing. Maneuvering units were not tested in space until February 1984, when a modified version called the Manned Maneuvering Unit (MMU) was flown by astronaut Bruce McCandless on Space Shuttle mission STS-41-B. The MMU used nitrogen gas propellant, which remains cold when vented.

=== Experiments ===
There were two photography experiments. S-1 hoped to image the Zodiacal light during an EVA, but it was changed to inside the spacecraft after the problems encountered by Cernan. S-11 involved the astronauts trying to image the Earth's airglow in the atomic oxygen and sodium light spectra; 44 pictures were taken as part of this experiment with three showing actual airglow.

S-10 had hoped to retrieve a Micrometeorite Collector from the ATDA. This failed after they were unable to dock with it, but they were able to image it during close approaches. Instead they recovered the similar S-12 collector on the Gemini spacecraft. D-12 also failed because it was an investigation of controlling the AMU.

The last experiment was D-14 which was UHF/VHF Polarization. This was an extendable antenna mounted on the adapter section at the rear of the spacecraft. It was hoped to obtain information about communication through the ionosphere. Six trials were performed but the antenna was broken by Cernan during his EVA.

=== Reentry ===
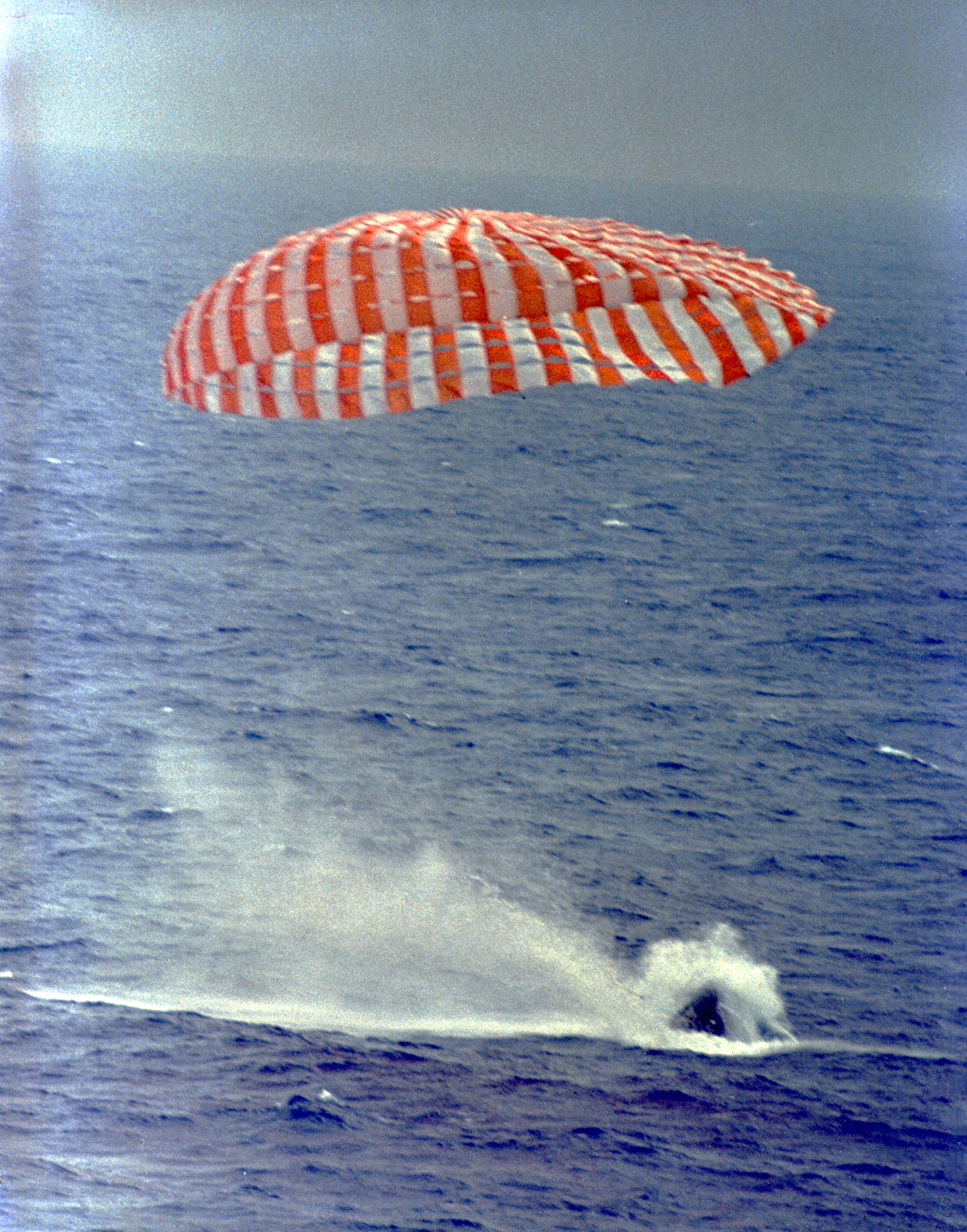
Gemini 9A splashes down at 9:00 a.m., June 6, 1966

The day of the EVA was also their last in space. On their 45th revolution of the Earth, the crewmen fired the retro-rockets that slowed them down so that they would reenter. This time the computer worked perfectly, meaning they landed only 700 meters from the planned landing site and were close enough to see the prime recovery ship, USS Wasp. The splashdown happened closer to the recovery ship than any other crewed spacecraft.

Postflight medical examination found that Stafford had lost five pounds of weight and Cernan up to 13 pounds, 10.5 of them during the EVA. Stafford later stated that Cernan's spacesuit was flown back to Houston and "they had about a pound or a pound and a half of water out of each boot". This was one of the physiological effects of his EVA, which included exhaustion and slight reduction in breathing intake.

After the mission a Mission Review committee was initiated to make sure that the objectives planned for each mission were realistic and had a direct benefit for Apollo.

The Gemini 9A mission was supported by 11,301 personnel, 92 aircraft and 15 ships from the U.S. Department of Defense.

== Insignia ==
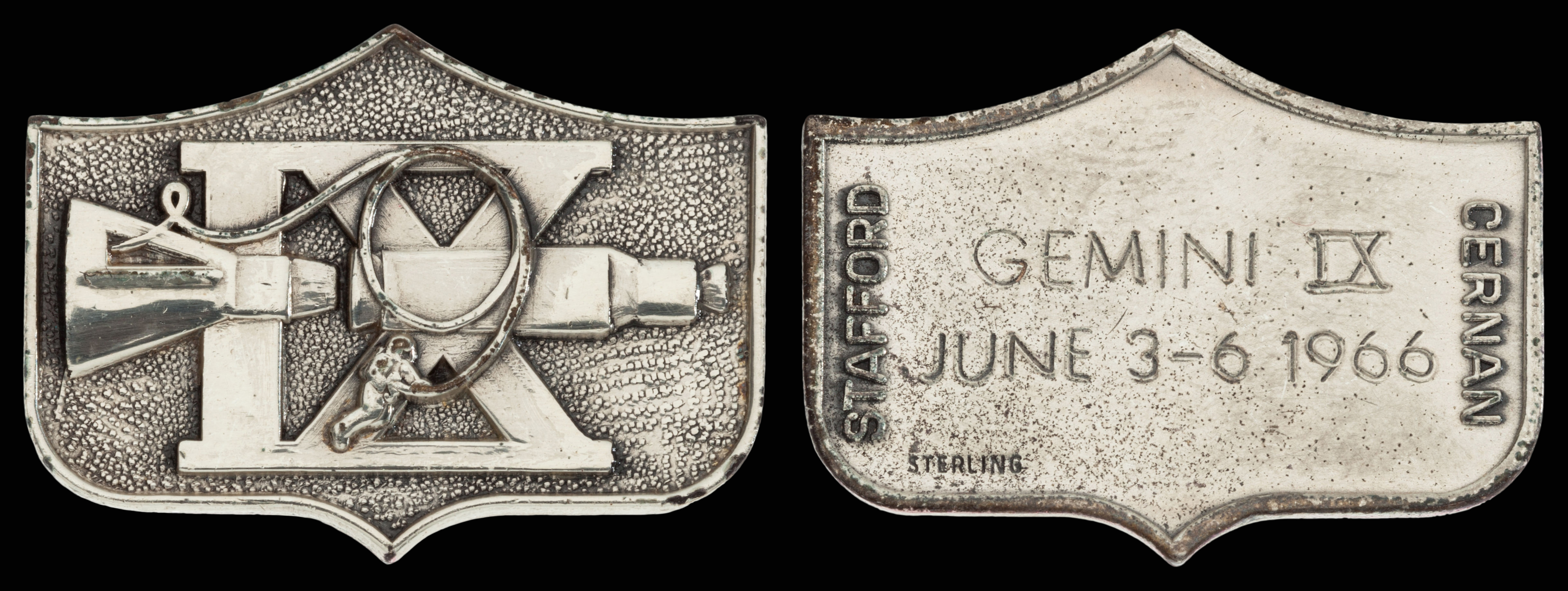
Gemini 9A space-flown Fliteline Medallion

The Gemini 9A patch is in the shape of a shield and shows the Gemini spacecraft docked to the Agena. There is a spacewalking astronaut, with his tether forming the shape of a number 9. Although the Gemini 9A mission was changed to use the ATDA, the patch was not changed.

== Spacecraft location ==
The spacecraft is on display at the Kennedy Space Center Visitor Center, Florida.

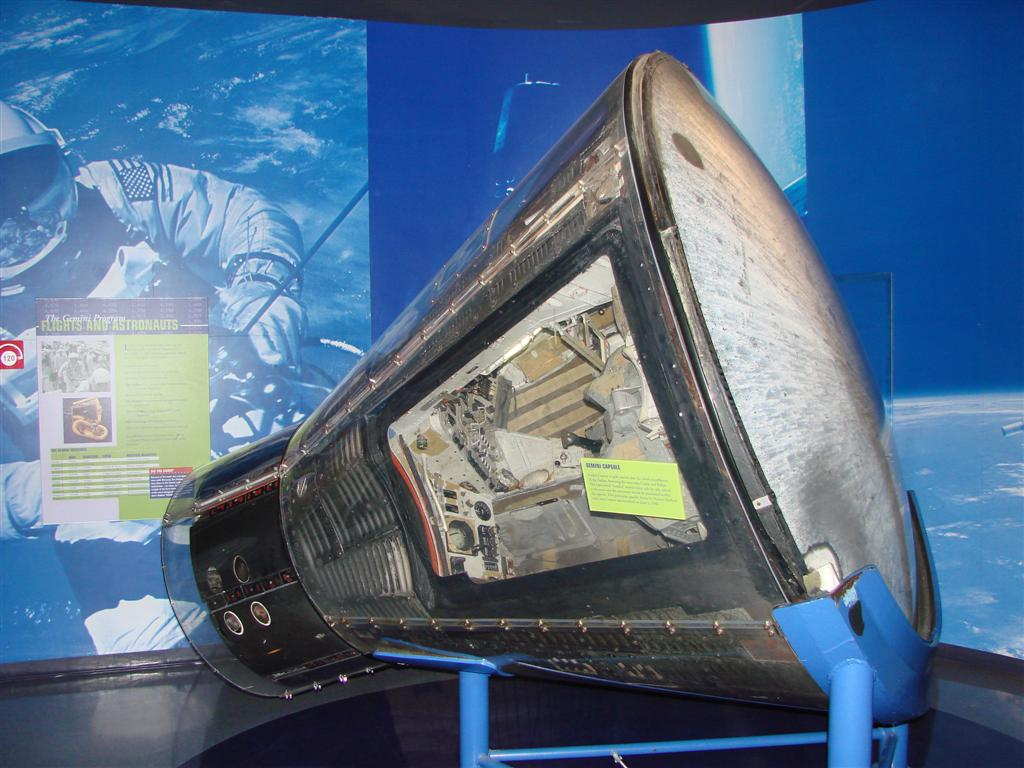
Gemini 9A spacecraft

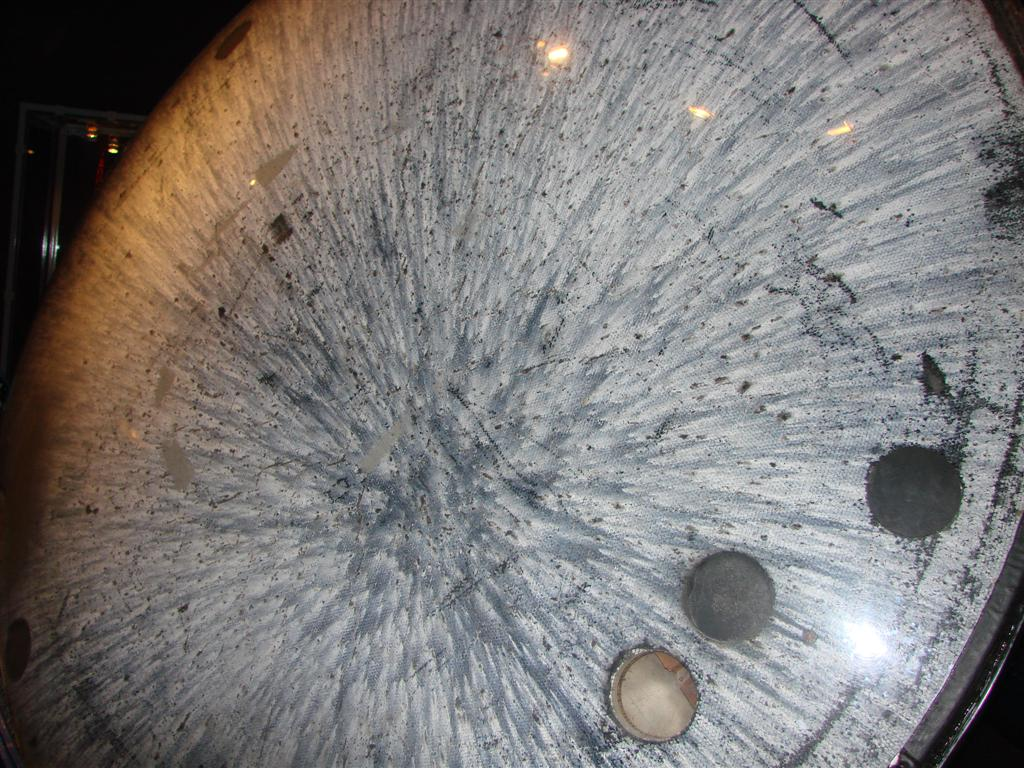
Heatshield

== See also ==
- Agena Target Vehicle
- Extra-vehicular activity
- List of spacewalks
- Splashdown
- Space exploration
- U.S. space exploration history on U.S. stamps
- Space suit
- Space capsule
