= See =

See or SEE may refer to:

- Visual perception

== Arts, entertainment, and media ==
- Music:
  - See (album), studio album by rock band The Rascals
    - "See", song by The Rascals, on the album See
  - "See" (Tycho song), song by Tycho
- Television
  - "See" (Preacher), episode of television series Preacher
  - See (TV series), series on Apple TV+
  - See (television channel), a Danish television channel
- See Magazine, alternative weekly newspaper in Edmonton, 1992 to 2011

== Education ==
- School of Experiential Education, Toronto alternative school
- Stanford Engineering Everywhere, Stanford University online-course series
- Student Excellence Expo
- Secondary Education Examination (Nepal)

== Manual language schemata ==
- Seeing Essential English (SEE1)
- Signing Exact English (SEE2)

== Organisations ==
- Special Enrollment Examination, U.S. Internal Revenue Service series
- Standard error of the equation, statistical method

== Religion ==
- Episcopal see, domain of a bishop
- Holy See, central government of the Roman Catholic Church

== Places ==
- SEE, Southeast Europe, the geographical region
- Sées, Orne, France
- Southease railway station, a railway station in Sussex, England

=== Place names evoking the German noun "See" (pron. "zay") ===
- See, Tyrol, Austria
- See District, Fribourg, Switzerland
- See District, St. Gallen, former district in Switzerland

==== Prominent lakes ====
- Bodensee
- Vierwaldstättersee (i.e. Lake Lucerne)

== People ==
- Members of See's Candies business family

=== Surname-last convention ===
- Carolyn See (1934–2016), American author
- Clyde See (1941–2017), American lawyer and politician
- Elliot See (1927–1966), American aviator and NASA astronaut
- John See (1844–1907), Premier of New South Wales from 1901 to 1904
- Lisa See (born 1955), American writer and novelist
- Thomas Jefferson Jackson See (1866–1962), American astronomer

=== Surname-first convention ===
- See Chee Keong (born 1966), Singaporean criminal
- See Kee Oon (born 1966), Judge of the Supreme Court of Singapore
- See Kok Luen (born 1988), Malaysian footballer

== Other uses ==
- Sealed Air, American manufacturing company (NYSE stock ticker)
- SEE, Gillespie Field, public airport near San Diego, California (IATA; FAA LID)
- Single-Event Error, also known as Single-Event Upset
- See, citation signal in legal and scholarly writing
- See Tickets, British company
- Square Enix Europe, a British video game publisher
- Sensory Ethical Extrovert, in socionics
- Small Emplacement Excavator, military vehicle

== See also ==
- C (disambiguation)
- See (surname)
- Seeing (disambiguation)
