= Charles Bassett =

United States Air Force test pilot and astronaut (1931–1966)

Charlie Bassett
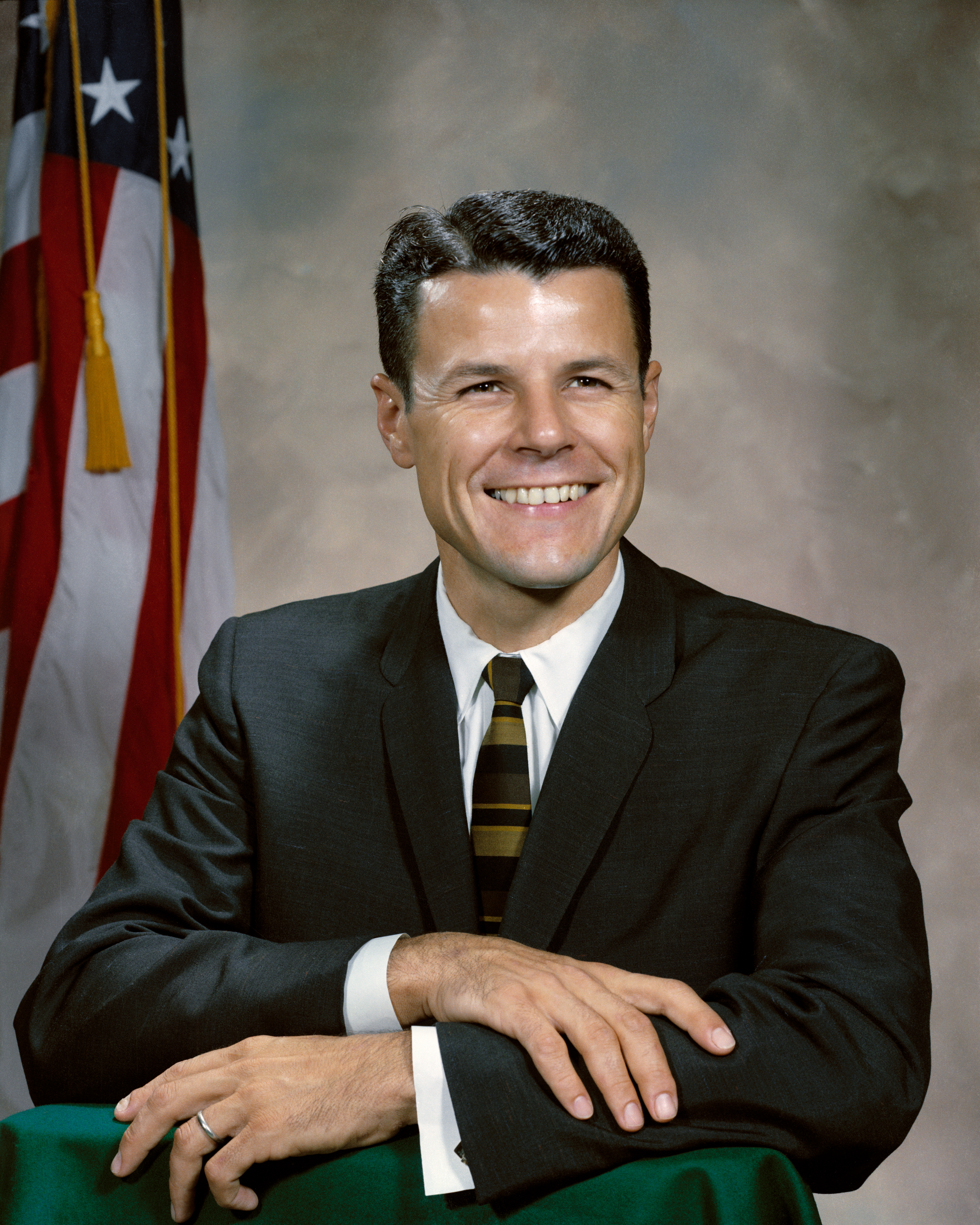
- Bassett in 1964
- Born: Charles Arthur Bassett II; December 30, 1931; Dayton, Ohio, U.S.
- Died: February 28, 1966 (aged 34); St. Louis, Missouri, U.S.
- Resting place: Arlington National Cemetery
- Education: Ohio State University; Texas Tech University (BS); University of Southern California
- Space career

NASA astronaut
- Rank: Major, USAF
- Selection: NASA Group 3 (1963)

Charles Arthur Bassett II (December 30, 1931 – February 28, 1966) (Major, USAF) was an American electrical engineer and United States Air Force test pilot and astronaut. He went to Ohio State University for two years and later graduated from Texas Tech University with a Bachelor of Science degree in Electrical Engineering. He joined the Air Force as a pilot and graduated from both the Air Force's Experimental Flight Test Pilot School and the Aerospace Research Pilot School. Bassett was married and had two children.

He was selected as a NASA astronaut in 1963 and was assigned to Gemini 9. He died in an airplane crash during training for his first spaceflight. He is memorialized on the Space Mirror Memorial; The Astronaut Monument; and the Fallen Astronaut memorial plaque, which was placed on the Moon during the Apollo 15 mission.

== Early life and education ==
Bassett was born on December 30, 1931, in Dayton, Ohio, to Charles Arthur "Pete" Bassett (1897–1957) and Fannie Belle Milby Bassett (née James; 1907–1993). Bassett was active in the Boy Scouts of America, where he achieved its second-highest rank, Life Scout. During high school, Bassett was a model plane aficionado. He belonged to a club that built gasoline-powered models and flew them in the school gym. Bassett's interest in model airplanes translated to real aircraft; he made his first solo flight at age 16. He worked odd jobs at the airport to earn money for flying lessons and earned his private pilot license at age seventeen.

After graduating from Berea High School, in Berea, in 1950, he attended Ohio State University, in Columbus, from 1950 to 1952. Midway through college in 1952, Bassett enrolled in Air Force ROTC; he entered the U.S. Air Force as an aviation cadet in October of that year. He attended Texas Technological College, now Texas Tech University, from 1958 to 1960. He received a Bachelor of Science degree with honors in electrical engineering from Texas Tech and did graduate work at University of Southern California (USC) in Los Angeles.

== Military service ==
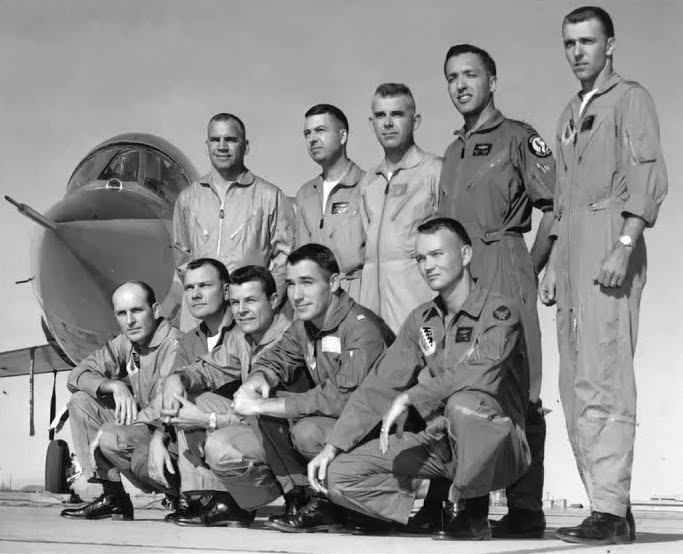
ARPS Class III graduates Front row: Edward Givens, Tommie Benefield, Charlie Bassett, Greg Neubeck and Mike Collins. Back row: Al Atwell, Neil Garland, Jim Roman, Al Uhalt and Joe Engle

He started his career with training at Stallings Air Base, North Carolina, and Bryan Air Force Base, Texas. Bassett graduated from Bryan in December 1953 and was commissioned in the Air Force. He arrived for additional training in Nellis Air Force Base, Nevada, as a second lieutenant. There, he flew trainer aircraft, such as the T-6, the T-28, and the T-33, and flew the jet fighter F-86 Sabre in 1954.

He went to Korea with the 8th Fighter Bomber Group and flew a F-86 Sabre. Bassett was too late to fly any combat missions, and said, "If you don't have any challenge, you never know how good you are." Bassett was promoted to first lieutenant in May 1955. He returned from Korea in 1955 and was assigned to Suffolk County Air Force Base, in New York, flying aircraft such as the F-86D, the F-102, and the C-119.

In November 1960, Bassett went to Maxwell Air Force Base, in Alabama, to attend Squadron Officer School. He also graduated from the Air Force Experimental Flight Test Pilot School (Class 62A) and the Aerospace Research Pilot School (Class III) and was promoted to captain. Bassett was an experimental test pilot and engineering test pilot in the Fighter Projects Office at Edwards Air Force Base, California, and logged over 3,600 hours of flying time, including over 2,900 hours in a jet aircraft.

== NASA career ==
Bassett was one of NASA's third group of astronauts, named in October 1963. In addition to participating in the overall astronaut training program, he had specific responsibilities related to training and simulators. On November 8, 1965, he was selected as pilot of the Gemini 9 mission with Elliot See as command pilot. Bassett was scheduled to make an untethered ninety-minute spacewalk, which was undertaken by Gene Cernan on Gemini 9A.

According to chief astronaut Deke Slayton's autobiography, he chose Bassett for Gemini 9 because he was "strong enough to carry" both himself and See. Slayton had also assigned Bassett as command module pilot for the second backup Apollo crew, alongside Frank Borman and William Anders.

== Personal life ==
On June 22, 1955, Bassett married Jeannie Martin. They had two children.

== Death ==
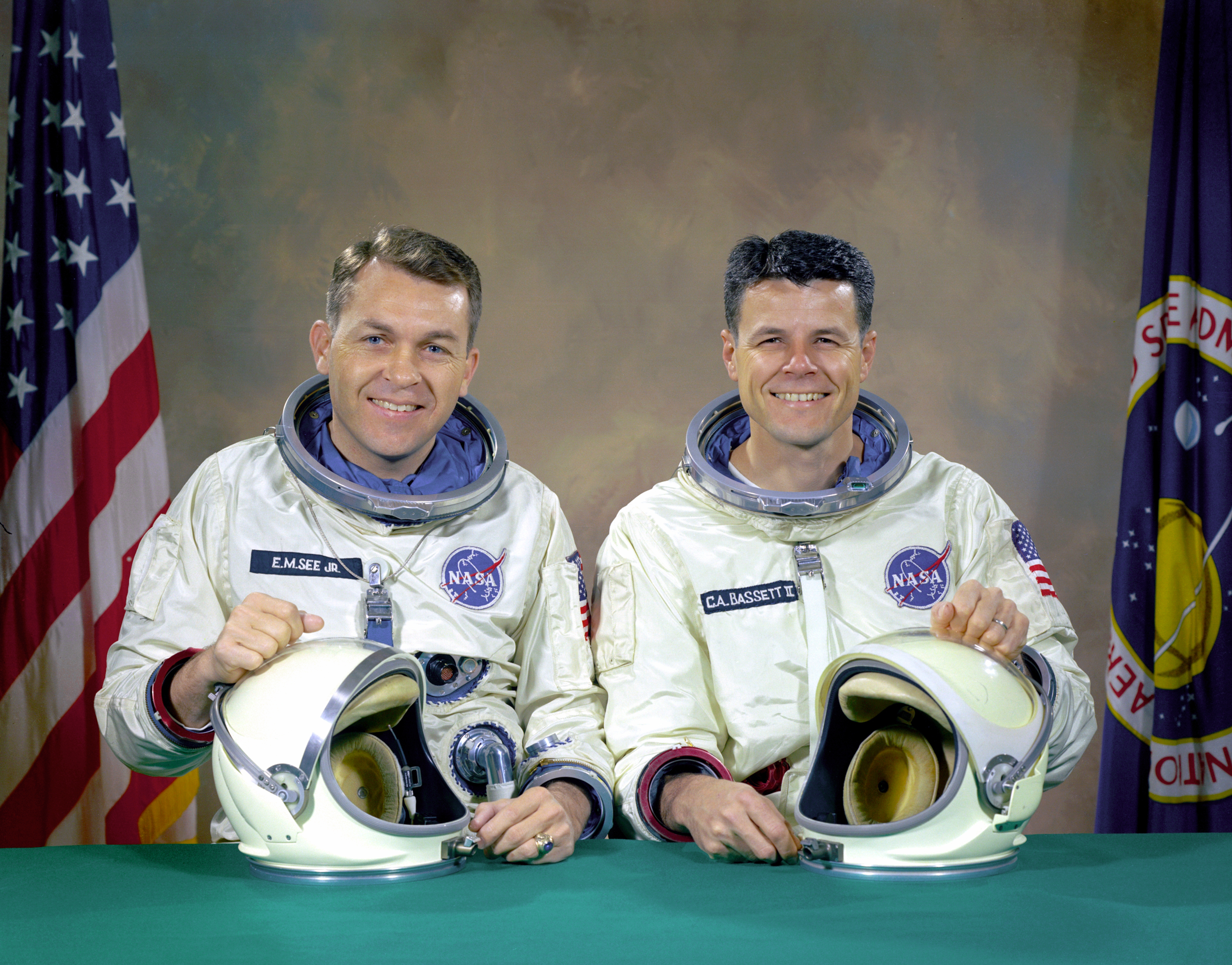
Elliot See and Charles Bassett

Bassett and Elliot See died on February 28, 1966, when their T-38 trainer jet, piloted by See, crashed into McDonnell Aircraft Building 101, known as the McDonnell Space Center, 1,000 feet (300 m) from Lambert Field airport in St. Louis, Missouri. Building 101 was where the Gemini spacecraft was built, and the two astronauts were going there that Monday morning to train for two weeks in a simulator. They died within five hundred feet (150 m) of their spacecraft.

Both astronauts died instantly from trauma sustained in the crash. See was thrown clear of the cockpit and was found in the parking lot still strapped to his ejection seat with the parachute partially open. Bassett was decapitated on impact; his severed head was found later in the day in the rafters of the damaged assembly building.

Both men's remains were buried in Arlington National Cemetery on Friday, March 4. During funeral services in Texas two days earlier, astronauts Jim McDivitt and Jim Lovell and civilian pilot Jere Cobb flew the missing man formation in Bassett's honor, while Buzz Aldrin, Bill Anders, and Walter Cunningham did the same to honor See.

A NASA investigative panel later concluded that pilot error, caused by poor visibility due to bad weather, was the principal cause of the accident. The panel concluded that See was flying too low to the ground during his second approach, probably because of the poor visibility.

== Memorials ==
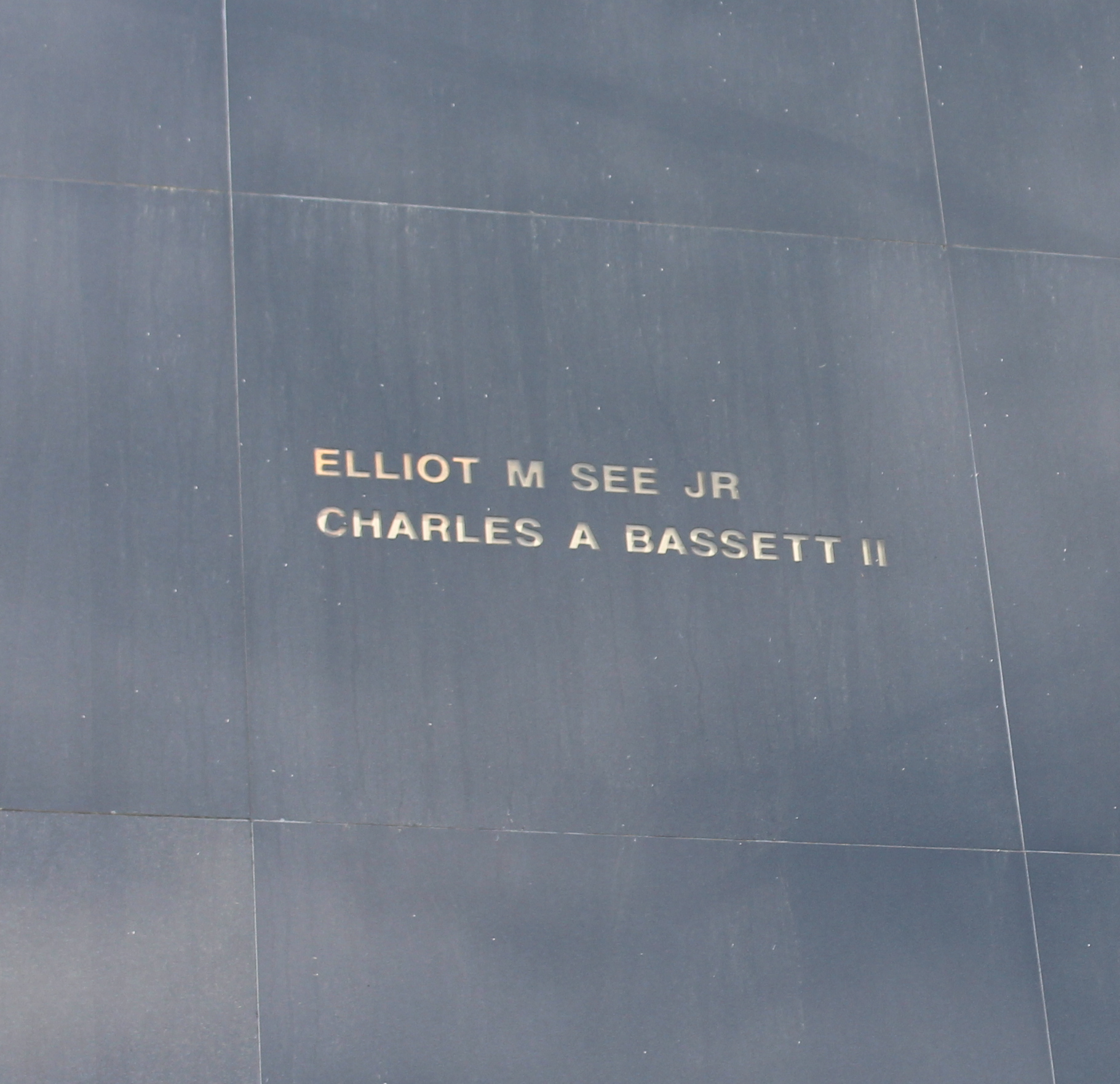
Bassett's name on the Space Mirror Memorial

Bassett is honored at the Kennedy Space Center Visitor Center's Space Mirror Memorial, alongside 24 other NASA astronauts who died in the pursuit of space exploration.

His name also appears on the Fallen Astronaut memorial plaque at Hadley Rille on the Moon, placed by the Apollo 15 mission in 1971. Texas Tech University dedicated an Electrical Engineering Research Laboratory building in Bassett's honor in November 1996.

== See also ==
- List of spaceflight-related accidents and incidents

== Bibliography ==
- Burgess, Colin; Doolan, Kate (2003). Fallen Astronauts: Heroes Who Died Reaching for the Moon. Bibson Books. ISBN 978-0-8032-6212-6.
- Slayton, Donald K. "Deke"; Cassutt, Michael (1994). Deke! U.S. Manned Space: From Mercury to the Shuttle (1st ed.). New York: Forge (St. Martin's Press). ISBN 0-312-85503-6. LCCN 94-2463. OCLC 29845663.
