= 1966 NASA T-38 crash =

Aviation disaster which killed two astronauts outside St. Louis, Missouri

NASA T-38 crash
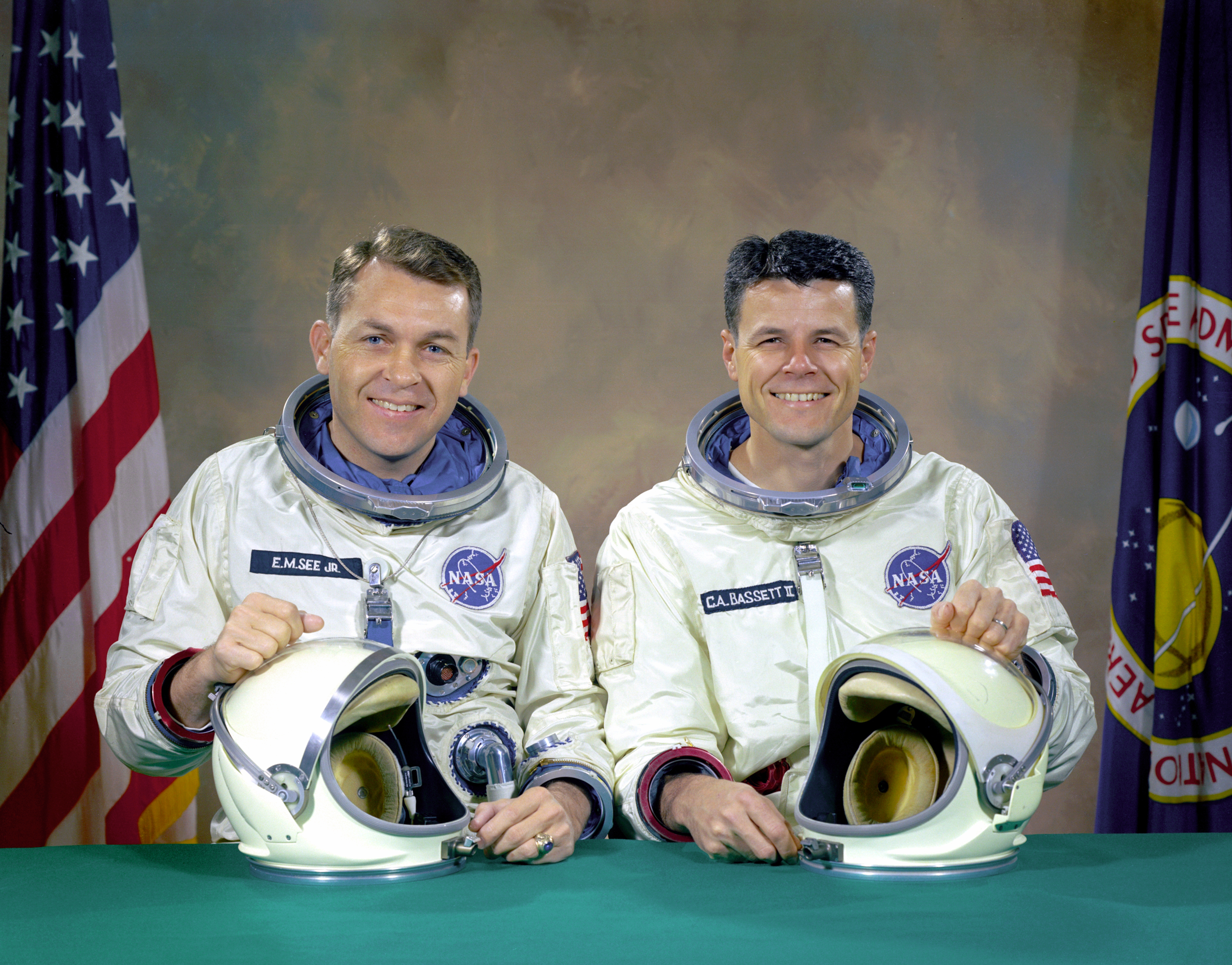
- Astronauts Elliot See and Charles Bassett

Accident
- Date: February 28, 1966, 8:58 am CST
- Summary: Controlled flight into terrain
- Site: McDonnell Aircraft Building 101, adjacent to Lambert Field, near St. Louis, Missouri, U.S.; 38°45′14″N 90°20′42″W

Aircraft
- Aircraft type: Northrop T-38 Talon
- Registration: NASA 901
- Flight origin: Ellington Air Force Base, Texas
- Destination: Lambert Field, St. Louis, Missouri
- Occupants: 2
- Crew: 2
- Fatalities: 2
- Survivors: 0

On February 28, 1966, a Northrop T-38 Talon from NASA crashed at Lambert Field in St. Louis, Missouri, United States, killing two Project Gemini astronauts, Elliot See and Charles Bassett. The aircraft, piloted by See, crashed into the McDonnell Aircraft building where their Gemini 9 spacecraft was being assembled. The weather was poor with rain, snow, fog, and low clouds. A NASA panel, headed by the chief of the Astronaut Office, Alan Shepard, investigated the crash. While the panel considered possible medical issues or aircraft maintenance problems, in addition to the weather and air traffic control factors, the end verdict was that the crash was caused by pilot error.

In the aftermath of the crash, the backup crew of Thomas Stafford and Eugene Cernan were moved up to the primary position for the Gemini 9 mission, scheduled for early June. Jim Lovell and Buzz Aldrin, who had formerly been the backup crew for Gemini 10, became the mission's backup crew and through the normal rotation were assigned as prime crew for Gemini 12.

== Accident ==
See and Bassett were the prime crew assigned to the Gemini 9 mission. They and the backup crew for the mission, Tom Stafford and Gene Cernan, were flying to St. Louis from their normal training base in Houston for two weeks of simulator training for rendezvous and docking procedures at McDonnell Aircraft, the prime contractor for the Gemini spacecraft. It was a routine flight that they had made many times previously.

See and Bassett flew in one Northrop T-38A Talon jet trainer, tail number NASA 901 (Air Force serial number 63-8181), with See at the controls and Bassett in the rear seat. A second T-38, NASA 907, carried Stafford and Cernan in the same configuration. The two aircraft took off from Ellington Air Force Base in Texas at 7:35 a.m. CST, with See in the lead and Stafford in wing position. Weather at Lambert Field in St. Louis was poor, with rain, snow, and fog, broken clouds at 800 ft (240 m) and a cloud ceiling of 1,500 ft (460 m), requiring an instrument approach. When the two aircraft emerged below the clouds shortly before 9 am, both pilots realized that they had missed the outer marker and overshot the runway.

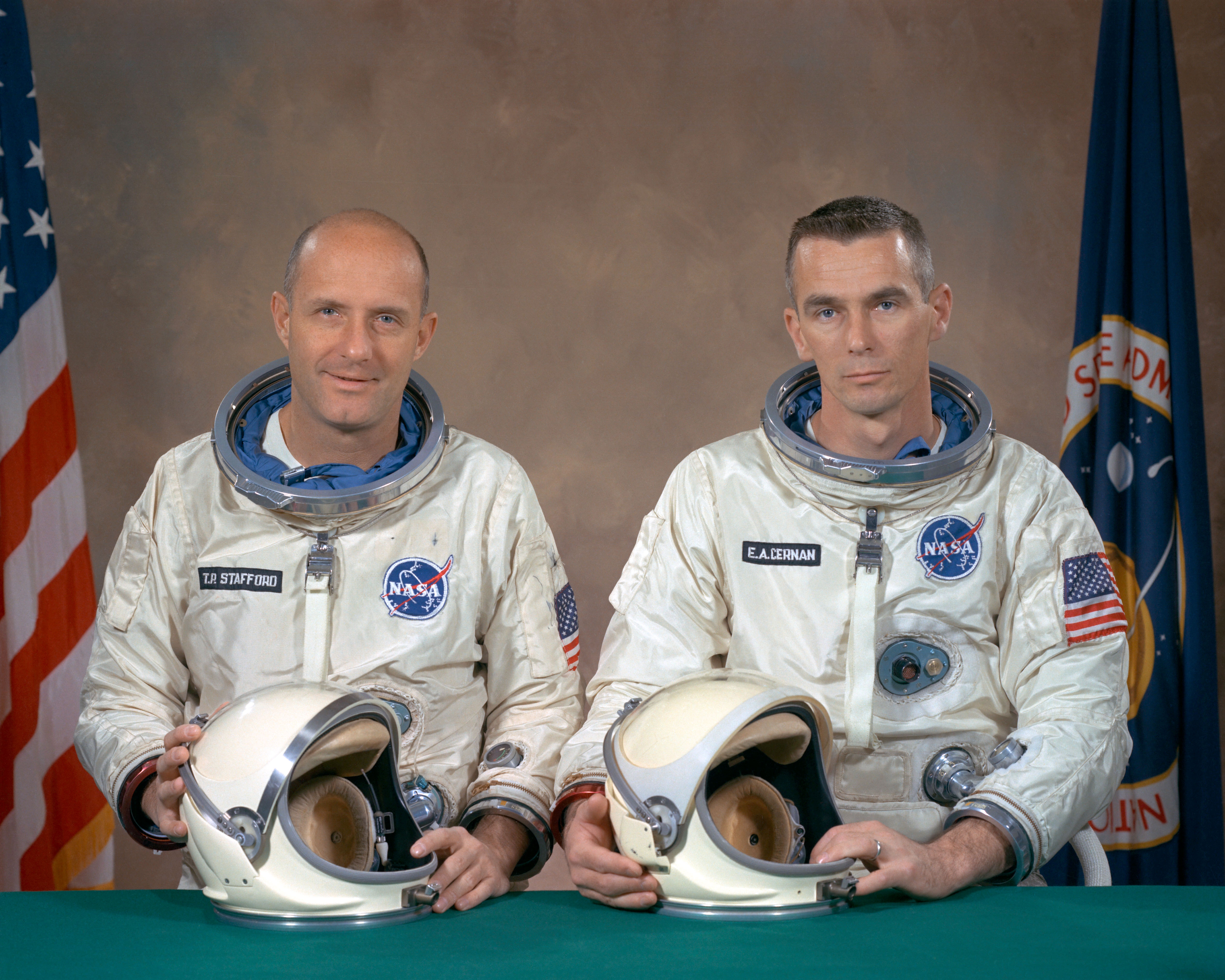
Thomas P. Stafford and Eugene A. Cernan, crew of the second T-38 and Gemini 9 backup crew

See then elected to perform a visual circling approach, a simplified landing procedure allowing flight under instrument rules, as long as the pilot can keep the airfield and any preceding aircraft in sight. The reported weather conditions at the airport were adequate for this type of approach, but visibility was irregular and deteriorating rapidly. Stafford began to follow See's plane, but when he lost sight of it in the clouds, he instead followed the standard procedure for a missed approach and pulled his aircraft up, back into the clouds for another attempt at an instrument landing.

See completed a full circle to the left at an altitude of 500 to 600 ft (150 to 180 m), and announced his intention to land on the southwest runway (24). With landing gear down and full flaps, the plane dropped quickly but too far left of the runway. See turned on his afterburner to increase power while pulling up and turning hard right. Seconds later, at 8:58 a.m. CST, the plane struck the roof of McDonnell Building 101 on the northeast side of the airport. It lost its right wing and landing gear on impact, then cartwheeled and crashed in a parking lot beyond the building which was in use as a construction staging area.

Both astronauts died instantly from trauma sustained in the crash. See was thrown clear of the cockpit and was found in the parking lot still strapped to his ejection seat with the parachute partially open. Bassett was decapitated on impact; his severed head was found later in the day in the rafters of the damaged assembly building.

Inside Building 101, 17 McDonnell employees and contractors received mostly minor injuries from falling debris. The crash set off several small fires inside the building, and caused minor flooding from broken pipes and sprinklers. See and Bassett died within 500 ft (150 m) of the spacecraft that they were to have flown in orbit, which was in the final stages of assembly in another part of Building 101. Spacecraft S/C9 was undamaged, but a piece of debris from the T-38's wing struck the unfinished S/C10 spacecraft.

Stafford and Cernan, still circling in the clouds in the second T-38, had no idea what had happened to their flight partners. Air traffic controllers were confused by the two planes in flight attempting different abort actions after the initial missed approach, and no one on the ground knew who was in the crashed plane. After some delay, Stafford and Cernan were asked to identify themselves and given permission to land, but they were not informed of the crash until on the ground. Although personally distraught over the loss of his close colleagues and friends, Stafford acted as NASA's chief contact on the scene until other personnel arrived to relieve him later in the day.

== Investigation and aftermath ==
NASA immediately appointed a seven-member panel to investigate the crash, headed by their Chief of the Astronaut Office, Alan Shepard. While the panel weighed possible medical issues, aircraft maintenance problems, weather conditions, and air traffic control factors, their end verdict was pilot error, citing See's inability "to maintain visual reference for a landing" as the primary cause of the crash. See was described as a "cautious and conservative" pilot in the accident report. In his memoir, chief astronaut Deke Slayton was less diplomatic, calling See's piloting skills "old-womanish." Others, including Neil Armstrong, who had worked with See on the backup crew for Gemini 5, have since defended See's piloting ability.

Since the crash did not affect space flight operations and the spacecraft itself was undamaged—it was shipped to NASA two days after the crash—the accident caused neither delays nor engineering changes in the U.S. space program. However, the loss of the Gemini 9 crew did cause NASA to reshuffle the crew assignments for subsequent Gemini and Apollo missions; Stafford and Cernan were moved up to the primary position for Gemini 9, re-designated Gemini 9A. Jim Lovell and Buzz Aldrin, who had formerly been the backup for Gemini 10, became the back-up crew for Gemini 9A, and through the normal rotation were then assigned as prime crew for the 1966's Gemini 12. Without experience during the Gemini mission, Buzz Aldrin would have been an unlikely choice for the 1969 Apollo 11 mission, during which he became the second man to walk on the Moon.
