= Seeing =

Seeing may refer to:

- Visual perception
- Astronomical seeing, the blurring effects of air turbulence in the atmosphere
- In the occult seeing refers to "the sight" or the ability to see auras or to predict the future; see fortune-telling
- Seeing (novel), the English title of José Saramago's 2004 novel Ensaio sobre a Lucidez
- "Seeing", a song on the Moby Grape album Moby Grape '69
- Seeing (composition), 1998 piano concerto by Christopher Rouse

== See also ==
- See (disambiguation)
- Seeing I (novel)
