= Sau language =

Sau may be:

- Samberigi language, spoken in Papua New Guinea
- Sahu language, spoken in Halmahera, Indonesia

== See also ==
- Sawi language (Dardic), spoken in the village of Sau, Afghanistan
