= Elliot See =

American astronaut (1927–1966)

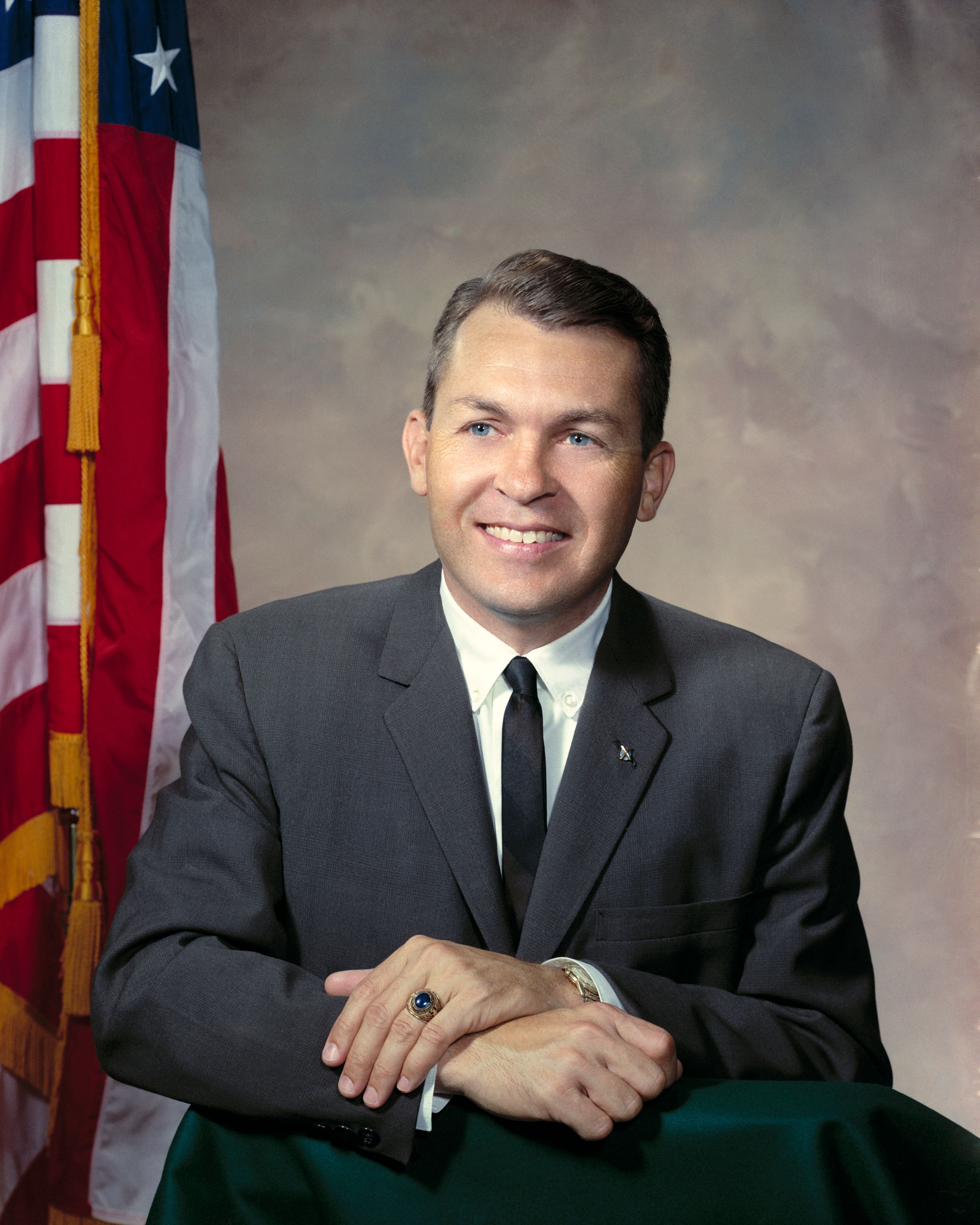
- See in 1964
- Born: Elliot McKay See Jr. July 23, 1927; Dallas, Texas, U.S.
- Died: February 28, 1966 (aged 38); St. Louis, Missouri, U.S.
- Resting place: Arlington National Cemetery
- Education: University of Texas, Austin (attended); United States Merchant Marine Academy (BS); University of California, Los Angeles (MS)
- Space career

NASA astronaut
- Rank: Commander, USNR
- Selection: 1962 NASA Group 2

Elliot McKay See Jr. (July 23, 1927 – February 28, 1966) was an American engineer, naval aviator, test pilot and NASA astronaut.

See received an appointment to the United States Merchant Marine Academy in 1945. He graduated in 1949 with a Bachelor of Science degree in marine engineering and a United States Naval Reserve commission, and joined the Aircraft Gas Turbine Division of General Electric as an engineer. He was called to active duty as a naval aviator during the Korean War, and flew Grumman F9F Panther fighters with Fighter Squadron 144 (VF-144) from the aircraft carrier USS Randolph in the Mediterranean, and USS Boxer in the Western Pacific. He married Marilyn Denahy in 1954, and they had three children.

See rejoined General Electric (GE) in 1956 as a flight test engineer after his tour of duty, and became a group leader and experimental test pilot at Edwards Air Force Base, where he flew the latest jet aircraft with GE engines. He also obtained a Master of Science degree in aeronautical engineering from UCLA.

Selected in NASA's second group of astronauts in 1962, See was the prime command pilot for what would have been his first space flight, Gemini 9. He was killed along with Charles Bassett, his Gemini 9 crewmate, in a NASA jet crash at the St. Louis McDonnell Aircraft plant, where they were to undergo two weeks of space rendezvous simulator training.

== Early life and education ==
Elliot McKay See Jr. was born on July 23, 1927, in Dallas, Texas, to Elliot McKay See Sr. (1888–1968) and Mamie Norton See (née Drummond; 1900–1988). He was the first of two children; his sister Sally Drummond See rounded out the family in 1930. His father was an electrical engineer who worked for General Electric, and his mother worked in jobs ranging from advertising to real estate. See was active in the Boy Scouts of America for five years, and earned the rank of Eagle Scout. He attended Highland Park High School and was on the varsity team in several sports, including boxing. He was also on the Reserve Officer Training Corps (ROTC) Rifle Team. He graduated from high school in 1945.

The United States entered World War II in December 1941. See had to choose between going to war or going to college, as he would otherwise be drafted at age 18. He decided to apply for aviation cadet training. He failed a physical, and, according to See, "going to college became the most important thing". He enrolled at the University of Texas, and after a few months pledged to Phi Kappa Psi. While at the University of Texas, he signed up for flying lessons and received his private pilot's license.

See applied for military officer training and received an appointment to the United States Merchant Marine Academy (USMMA) in 1945. As the end of the war drew near, the USMMA changed its curriculum to a four-year college-level program, which was the minimum requirement to be a merchant marine in peacetime. He spent his plebe year at Pass Christian, Mississippi, where the USMMA had a satellite campus, and then transferred to the main campus at Kings Point, New York. He commanded the Third Company as a cadet officer. He was a member of the Propeller Club and head cheerleader. He was on the mile relay running team, played intramural softball, and was a varsity boxer. As co-captain of the rifle team, he won the Captain Tomb Trophy for individual rifle and pistol marksmanship in December 1948. In 1949, Congress authorized the USMMA to award Bachelor of Science degrees to its graduates, so on graduation that year Elliot received his B.S. degree, his marine engineer's licenses, and a commission as an officer in the United States Naval Reserve.

== Navy service and General Electric ==
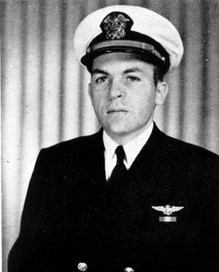
See as a lieutenant (junior grade) during his tour of duty on USS Boxer

After graduation, See took a summer job with Lykes Brothers Steamship Company. On September 1, 1949, he joined the Aircraft Gas Turbine Division of General Electric, the firm his father had worked for, in Boston. He moved to Cincinnati, Ohio, when the division was relocated. There he met Marilyn Jane Denahy from Georgetown, Ohio, who worked at General Electric as a secretary. He and his friend Tay Haney pooled their funds to buy a Luscombe Silvaire Sprayer aircraft, which they flew on cross-country trips. In November 1952, while taking Marilyn on a joyride, the Luscombe's engine began to fail. See attempted to land the aircraft on a short, unimproved field, but the tail wheel snagged a power line and forced the aircraft into the ground. See suffered deep cuts to his face which required plastic surgery. Marilyn escaped the crash with only minor injuries.

By 1953, See was working as a flight test engineer at General Electric's plant in Evendale, Ohio. Like many naval reservists, he was called to active duty due to the Korean War. He was initially stationed at Miramar Naval Air Station near San Diego, California. He married Marilyn on September 30, 1954, before shipping out for a sixteen-month operational tour as a naval aviator, flying the Grumman F9F Panther with Fighter Squadron 144 (VF-144), part of Carrier Air Group 14. He was deployed to the Mediterranean on the aircraft carrier USS Randolph, which returned to the United States in June 1955.

In October, after further training at El Centro Naval Air Station, California, he embarked with VF-144 on an operational cruise on the aircraft carrier USS Boxer, which formed part of Task Force 77. The task force traveled to Hawaii, Japan, the Philippine Islands, and Hong Kong. See primarily focused on line maintenance, but also became proficient at carrier landings. By the end of the tour, he had reached the rank of lieutenant commander. He returned home in February 1956, in time for the birth of his first child, Sally. The couple later had two more children: Carolyn in 1957, and David in 1962.

See rejoined General Electric in 1956 as a flight test engineer after his tour of duty. He became a group leader and experimental test pilot at Edwards Air Force Base, California, where the United States Air Force conducted flight tests. He served as a project pilot for the development of the General Electric J79-8 engine used in the F4H aircraft. He also conducted powerplant flight tests on the J-47, J-73, J-79, CJ805 and CJ805 aft-fan engines, which involved flying in F-86, XF4D, F-104, F11F-1F, RB-66, F4H, and T-38 aircraft. He worked towards his master's degree one night a week, starting in 1960, eventually obtaining a Master of Science degree in aeronautical engineering from UCLA in 1962, and continued flying with the Naval Reserve. He was eventually promoted to commander.

== NASA ==
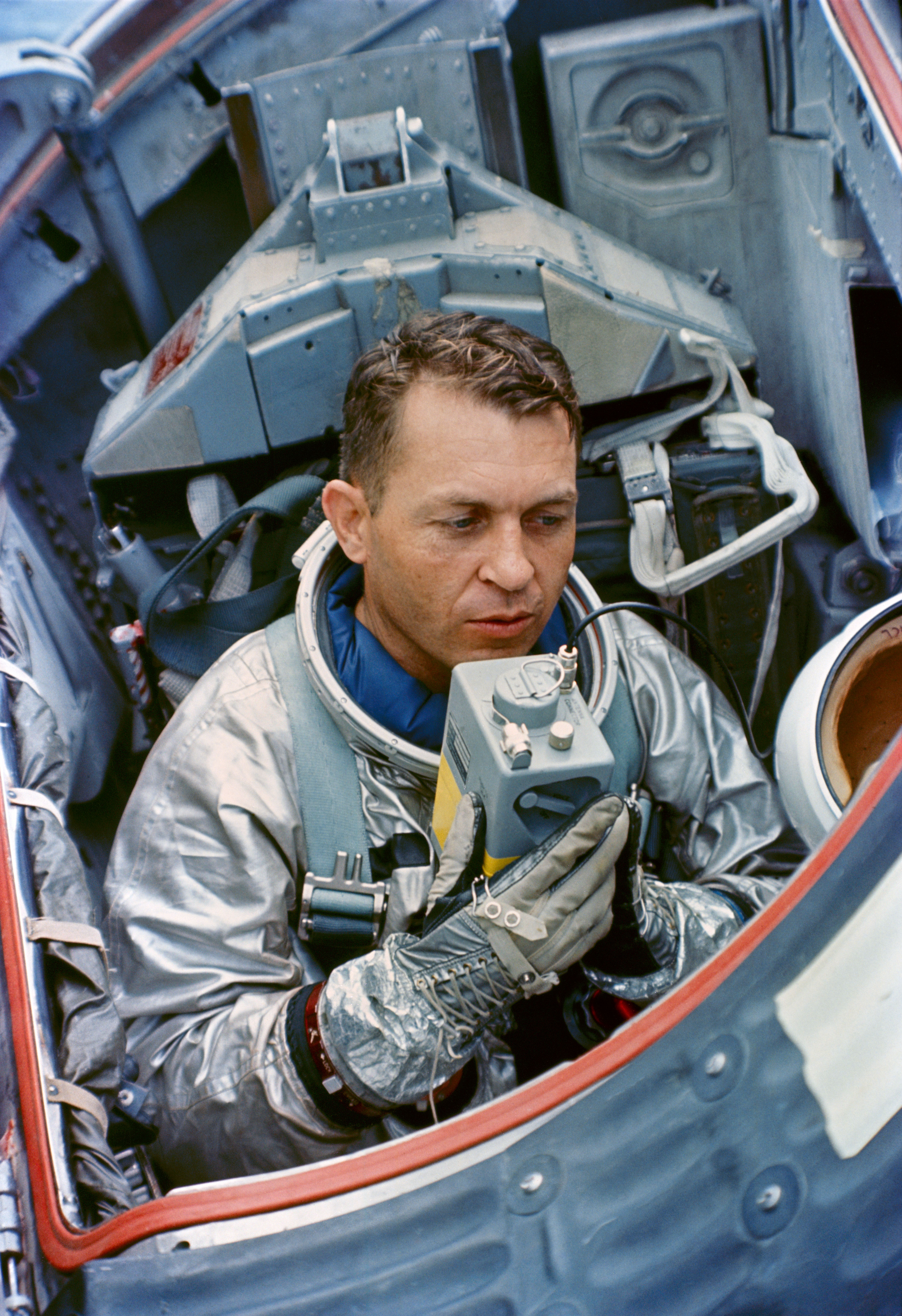
See during water egress training

In 1962, See applied to become a NASA astronaut. After undergoing preliminary evaluations, medical tests, and interviews during the selection process, See was selected to be in NASA's second group of astronauts, known as The New Nine. He was 35 at the time of his selection; the oldest in the group. On his selection, he said "Overwhelmed isn't the right word. I was amazed and certainly pleased. It's a very great honor." At the time of his selection, See had logged more than 3,900 hours of flying time, including more than 3,300 in jet aircraft. He drove from Edwards with fellow civilian pilot Neil Armstrong to start his new career in Houston, Texas, where the new Manned Spacecraft Center (MSC) was under construction.

Every astronaut was assigned a core competency, a special area in which they had to develop expertise, by the NASA Astronaut Office. The knowledge they gathered could then be shared with the others, and the astronaut-expert was expected to provide astronaut input to the spacecraft designers and engineers. See's special area of expertise was the spacecraft electrical and sequential systems, and the coordination of mission planning. See was tasked with determining if the crewed lunar landing should occur in direct sunlight or using light reflected from the Earth. To help make the decision, he flew helicopters and airplanes wearing special welding goggles to simulate different lighting conditions. See also landed helicopters with Jim Lovell on lava flows that simulated the terrain on the Moon.

See was announced as the backup pilot for Gemini 5 on February 8, 1965, with Armstrong serving as the backup command pilot. As the first civilians selected for a spaceflight, the team trained from the spring to the fall of 1965 for the Gemini 5 mission. They flew back and forth to Kennedy Space Center, from which their spacecraft would be launched; to North Carolina to develop experiments to be conducted during the flight; and to McDonnell Aircraft in St. Louis, where the Gemini spacecraft was made.

Gemini 5 was launched on August 21, 1965. Early in the flight, a problem was discovered with the fuel cells, and the flight controllers considered ending the mission early. See, who had worked with General Electric in developing the fuel cells, was confident that they could find a solution. Flight Director Chris Kraft gave them 24 hours to fix the problem. After working through the night, they diagnosed the problem and developed procedures that allowed the astronauts to fix the fuel cells, which allowed the mission to continue.

See was a capsule communicator (CAPCOM) at MSC in Houston during the Gemini 7/Gemini 6A rendezvous mission in December 1965.

Under the crew rotation system devised by chief astronaut Deke Slayton, as the backup for Gemini 5, Armstrong and See would have been in line for prime crew of Gemini 8. Instead, David Scott took See's place as the pilot of Gemini 8. According to his autobiography, Slayton did not assign See to Gemini 8 because he considered him as too out-of-shape to perform an extravehicular activity. Life photographer Ralph Morse asked Armstrong why See was no longer assigned with him on the Gemini 8 mission, and Armstrong replied, "Elliot's too good a pilot not to have a command of his own." In October 1965 See was promoted to command pilot (first seat) of Gemini 9, with Charles Bassett as his pilot. The Gemini 9 mission was similar to the previous mission. An extravehicular activity (EVA) that used the Astronaut Maneuvering Unit (AMU) was scheduled, and they would rendezvous with an Agena target vehicle. Bassett was scheduled for the EVA and See would stay in the capsule.

== Death ==
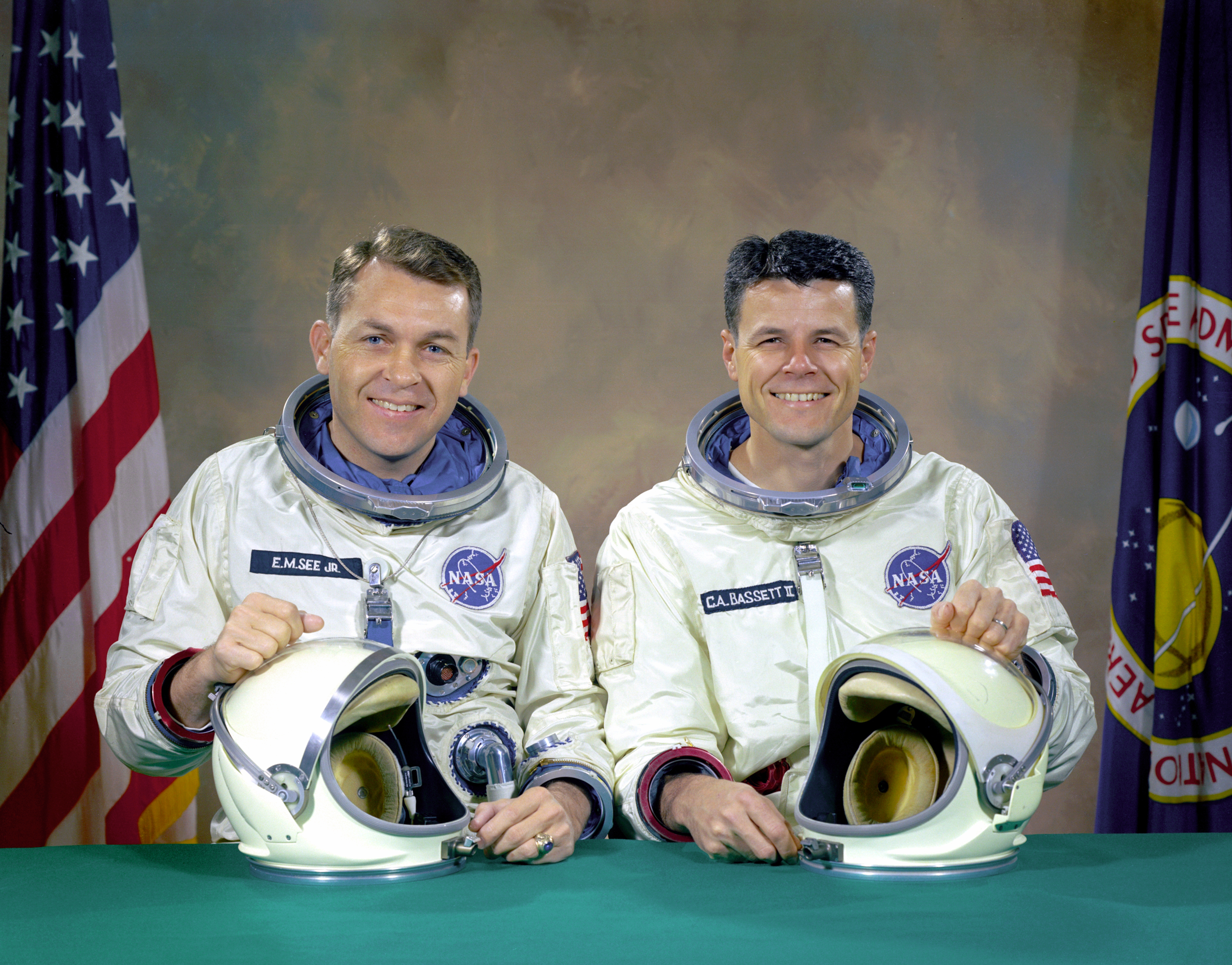
Elliot See and Charles Bassett

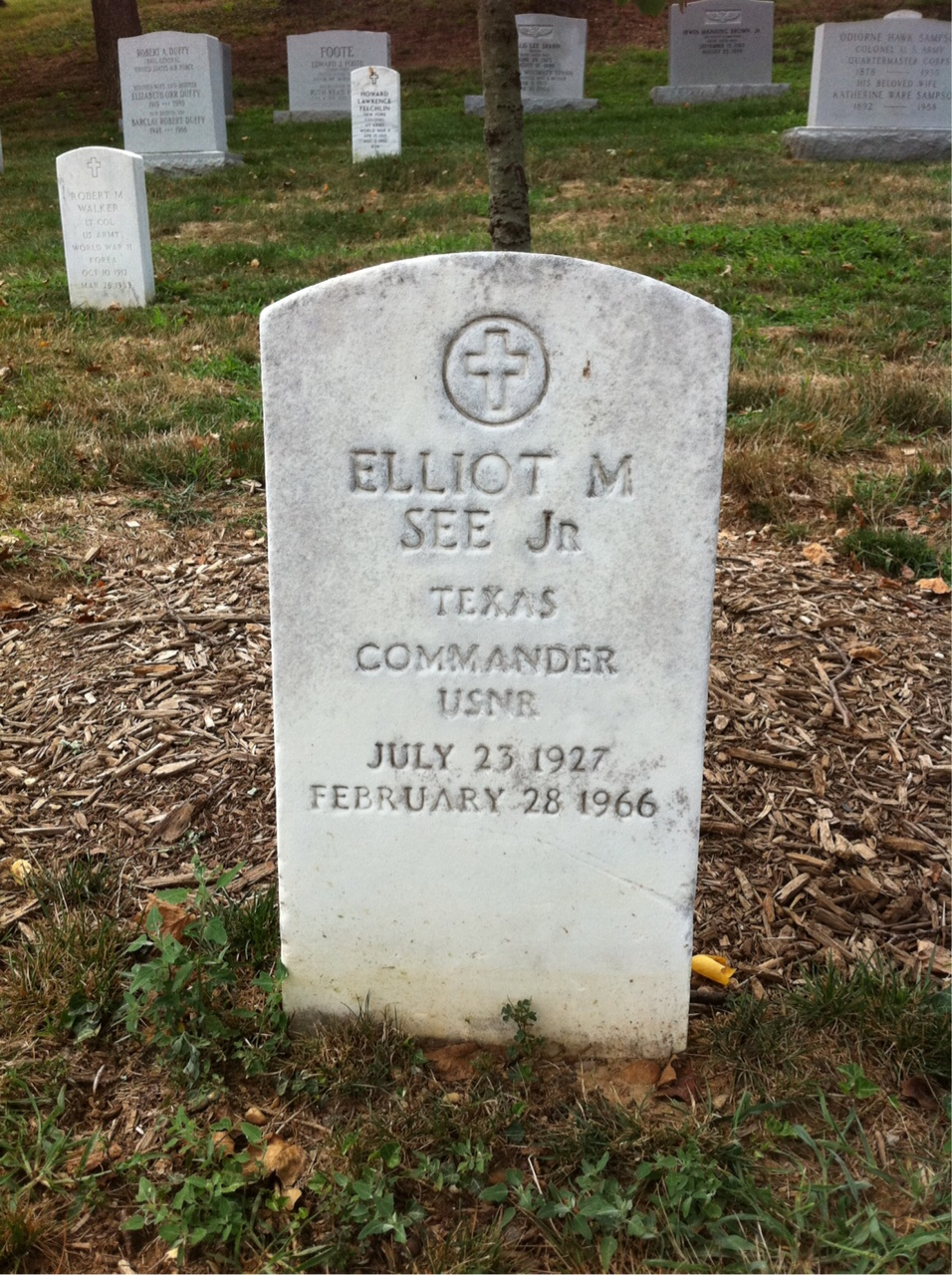
Grave of Elliot See at Arlington National Cemetery

On February 28, 1966, See and Charles Bassett were flying with their backup crew, Gene Cernan and Thomas Stafford, from Ellington Air Force Base to Lambert Field in St. Louis, Missouri, for two weeks of space rendezvous simulator training. The prime crew flew in one jet and the backup crew in another. See was the pilot of their T-38 trainer jet, with Bassett in the rear seat.

The weather at Lambert Field that Monday morning was poor and required an instrument approach. Both jets overshot the initial landing attempt; See continued with a visual circling approach and Stafford elected to follow the standard procedure for a missed approach. On his second attempt, See undershot the runway, hit the afterburners and turned to the right.

The jet crashed into McDonnell Aircraft Building 101, where the Gemini spacecraft was built. See was found in a parking lot still strapped to his ejection seat. Both astronauts died instantly from trauma sustained in the accident, within five hundred feet (150 m) of their spacecraft. See and Bassett were buried near each other in Arlington National Cemetery; their graves are about one hundred yards (90 m) from Theodore Freeman, another astronaut who had died in a T-38 crash sixteen months earlier.

After a reporter had disclosed to Freeman's wife that he had died, NASA enacted new policies to avoid a similar embarrassing situation in the future. In compliance with these policies, astronaut John Young asked Marilyn Lovell and Jane Conrad to go to Marilyn See's house and ensure that she did not find out about her husband's death from a non-NASA source. They rushed over and made excuses for their early surprise visit. After Young arrived to break the news, the three hugged her for comfort. Marilyn Lovell then went to the school to pick up Marilyn See's children, to make sure they did not find out from the press.

A NASA investigative panel later concluded that pilot error, caused by bad weather, was the principal cause of the accident. The panel concluded that See was flying too low on his second approach, probably due to poor visibility. At the time, See was known as one of the better pilots in the astronaut corps. Slayton later expressed doubts about See's flying abilities, claiming that he flew too slowly: "[He] wasn't aggressive enough ... he flew too slow—a fatal problem in a plane like the T-38, which will stall easily if you get below 270 knots (500 km/h; 310 mph)."

Jim Lovell and Buzz Aldrin were promoted to the backup crew as a result of the accident. Stafford and Cernan, the original backup crew, were launched three months later on June 3, 1966, as Gemini 9A. The shuffling of the Gemini crews caused by the deaths of See and Bassett affected crew assignments for subsequent Gemini and Project Apollo missions. In particular, Aldrin flew as the pilot of Gemini 12, and later Apollo 11.

On Friday, March 4, 1966, both men were buried in Arlington National Cemetery. During funeral services in Texas two days before, Aldrin, Bill Anders, and Walter Cunningham flew the missing man formation in See's honor, while Lovell, Jim McDivitt, and civilian pilot Jere Cobb did the same to honor Bassett.

== Legacy ==
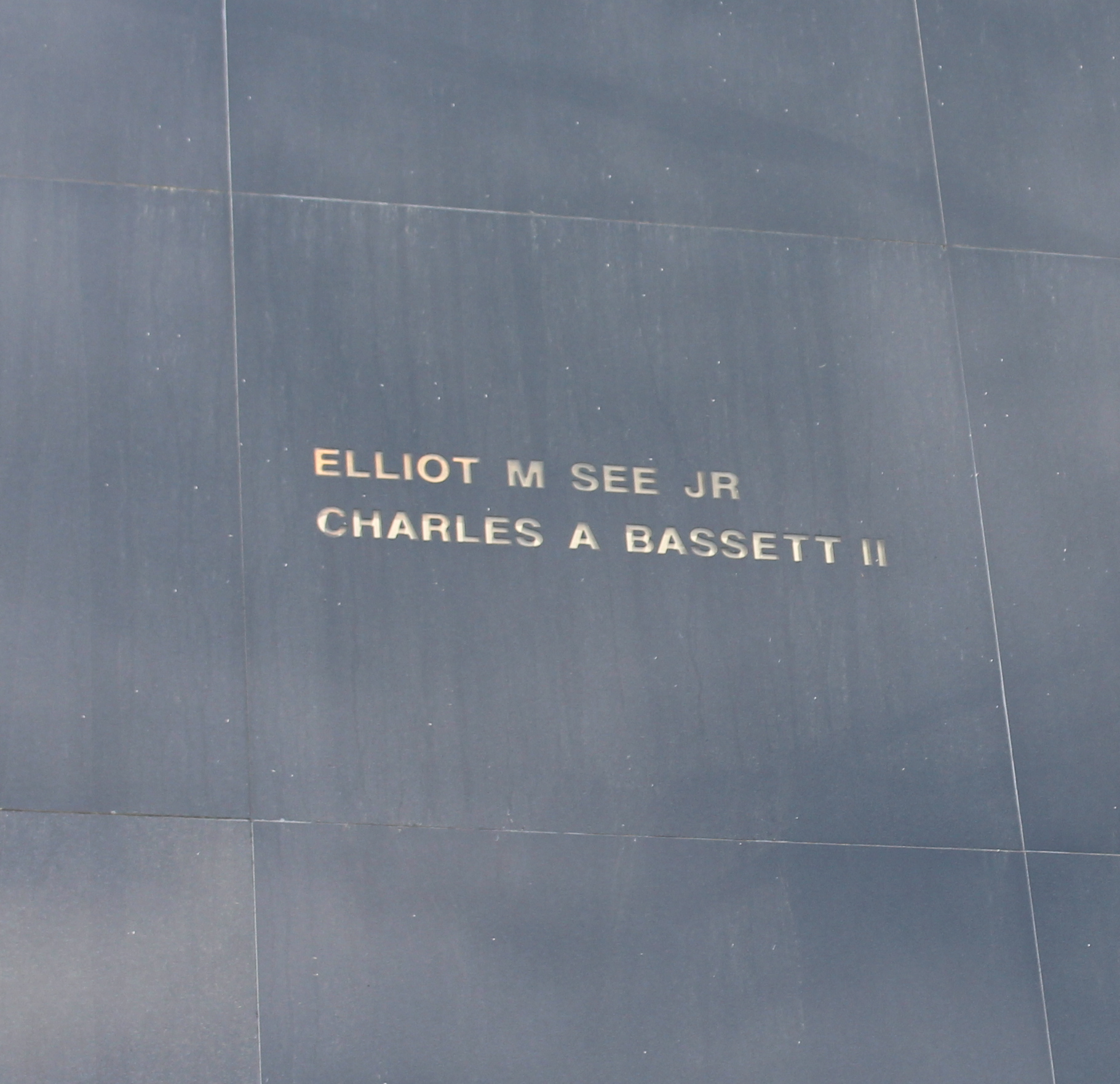
Names of See and Bassett on the Space Mirror Memorial

See was survived by his wife Marilyn and three children. After his death she continued to live in Houston, where she worked as a court reporter. See's name is inscribed on the Fallen Astronaut plaque placed on the Moon by Apollo 15 in 1971. He is also listed on the Space Mirror Memorial at the John F. Kennedy Space Center Visitor Complex, dedicated in 1991. He was honored by Highland Park High School in 2010 as one of the recipients of its Distinguished Alumni Award. A conference room in Wiley Hall at the USMMA is also dedicated to his memory.

See was a member of the Society of Experimental Test Pilots (SETP) and an associate fellow of the American Institute of Aeronautics and Astronautics (AIAA).

== In media ==
See was played by Steve Zahn in the 1998 HBO miniseries From the Earth to the Moon, and by Patrick Fugit in the 2018 film First Man.

== See also ==
- Fallen Astronaut
- List of Eagle Scouts
- List of spaceflight-related accidents and incidents
