= SSAWS =

Indoor ski slope

Coordinates: 35.681472°N 139.991934°E

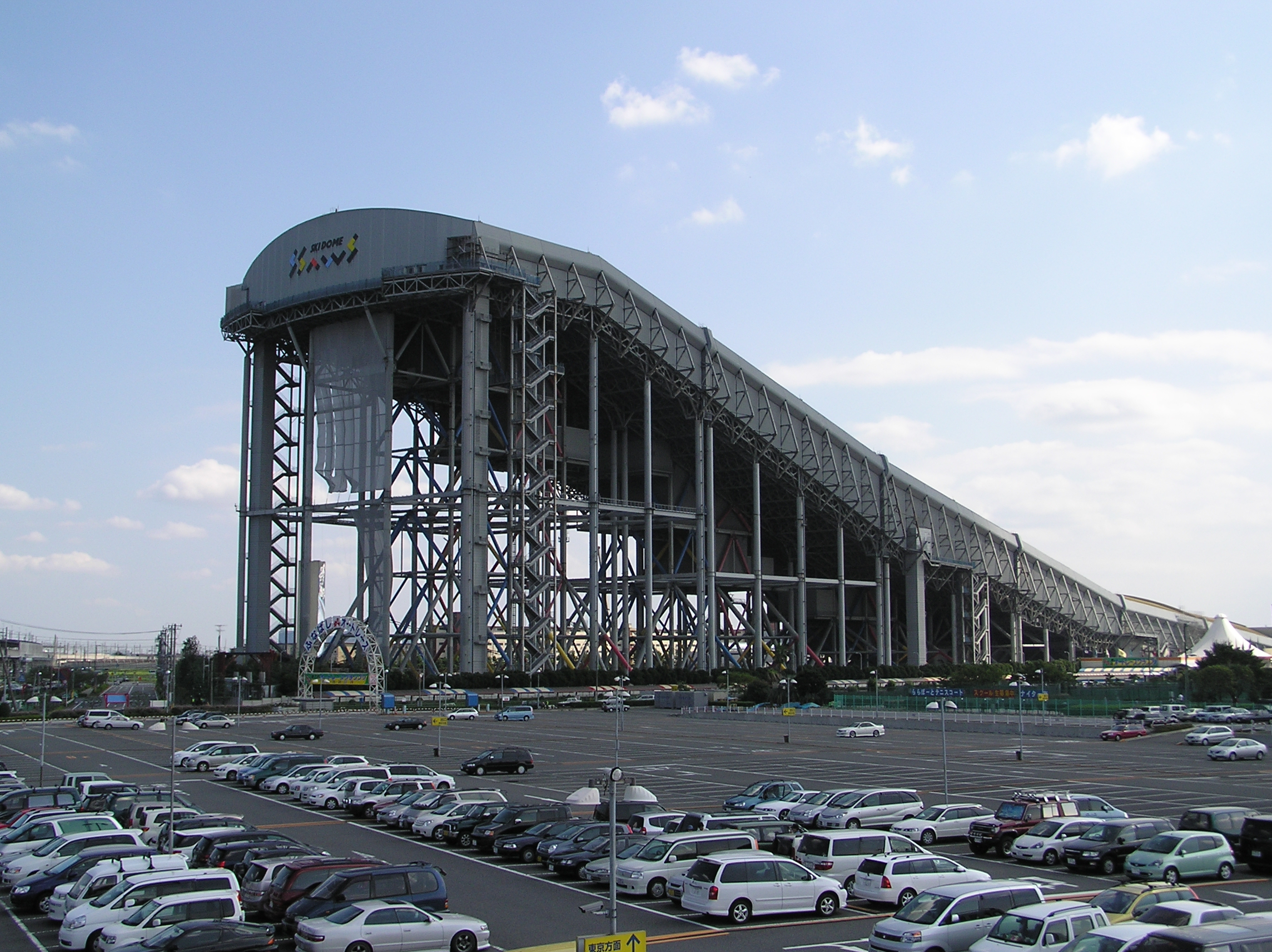
SSAWS in September 2003, shortly before demolition

SSAWS, pronounced "zaws" (ザウス) and officially known as LaLaport Skidome SSAWS (ららぽーとスキードームSSAWS), was an indoor ski slope in Funabashi, Chiba, Japan. The name was an acronym of "Spring Summer Autumn Winter Snow".

Constructed by Mitsui at a cost of US$400 million, the ski slope opened on July 15, 1993. With a structural height of 100 meters (330 ft) — translating to a skiable vertical drop of 80 metres (260 ft), a width of 100 metres (330 ft) and a length of 500 metres (1,600 ft), it was the largest indoor ski slope in the world at the time. The complex had three ski courses—20.1° for skilled skiers, 15° for intermediate, and 10° for beginners — and two ski lifts.

The ski slope was designed to break even by 2018 by attracting 1.3 million visitors yearly, who would pay ¥4,300 (~US$50) for 2 hours of lift time and spend a total of $70 on average. However, the opening of the ski slope came shortly after the end of the Japanese asset price bubble, and original estimates soon proved too optimistic, with the number of visitors dropping from one million in the first year to 700,000 in the second. With an annual operating cost of US$40 million, SSAWS sustained losses averaging US$16.7 million/year.

SSAWS closed on September 30, 2002. In 2003, the structure was demolished to make way for Japan's first large-format IKEA store, which opened on the site on April 24, 2006.
