= Gemini 2 =

Second American Gemini program spaceflight

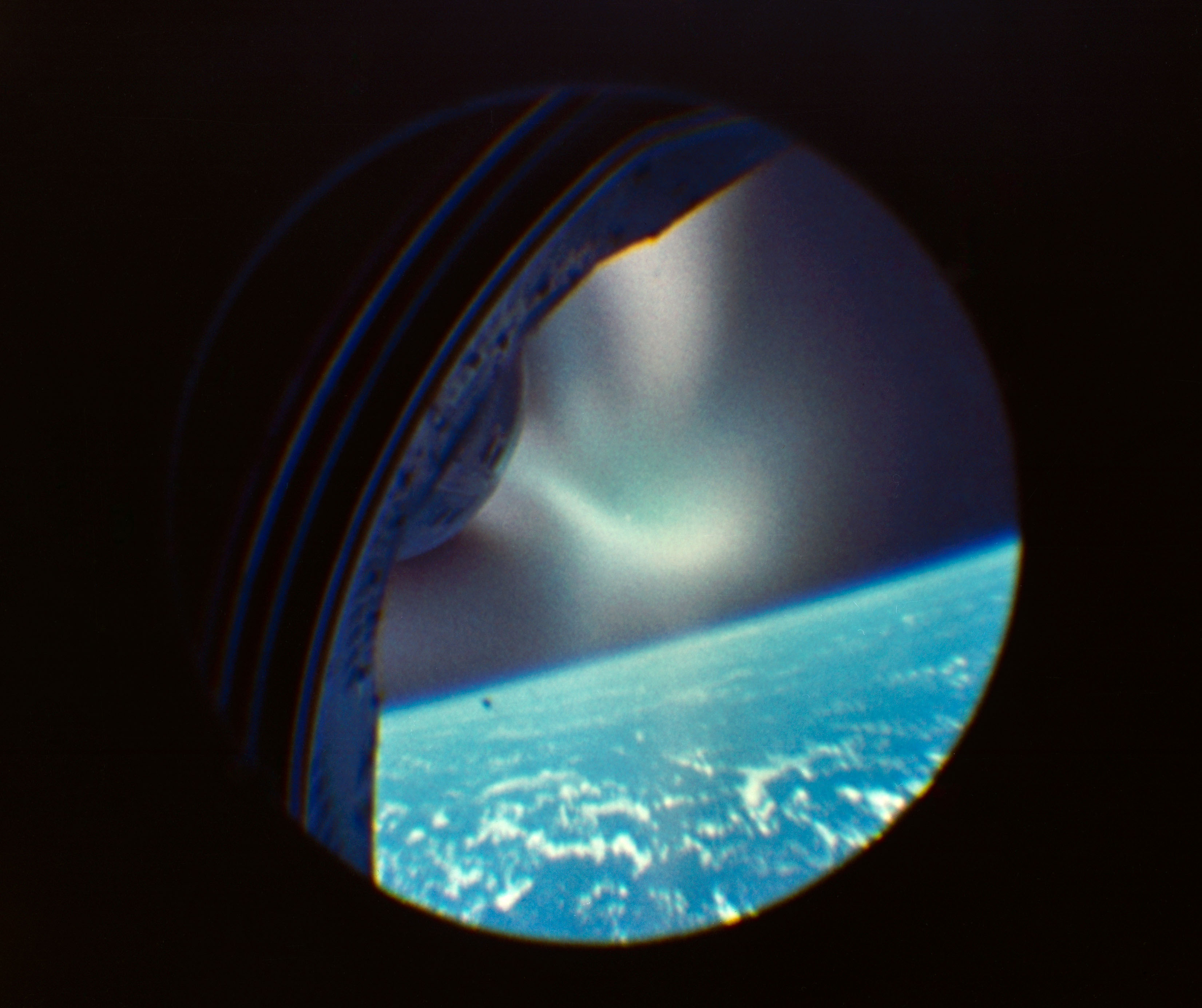
- The atmospheric re-entry of Gemini 2 viewed through a pilot's window
- Mission type: Flight test
- Operator: NASA
- Mission duration: 18 minutes, 14 seconds
- Range: 3,422.4 km (2,127 mi; 1,848 nmi)
- Apogee: 171.1 km (106 mi; 92 nmi)

Spacecraft properties
- Spacecraft: Gemini SC2
- Manufacturer: McDonnell

Start of mission
- Launch date: January 19, 1965, 14:04:00 UTC (9:04 am EST)
- Rocket: Titan II GLV, s/n 62-12557
- Launch site: Cape Kennedy, LC-19

End of mission
- Recovered by: USS Lake Champlain
- Landing date: January 19, 1965, 14:22:14 UTC (9:22:14 am EST)
- Landing site: Atlantic Ocean (16°36′N 49°46′W)

Gemini 2 (Gemini-Titan 2; GT-2) was the second spaceflight of the American human spaceflight program Project Gemini, and was launched and recovered on January 19, 1965. Gemini 2, like Gemini 1, was an uncrewed mission intended as a test flight of the Gemini spacecraft. Unlike Gemini 1, which was placed into orbit, Gemini 2 made a suborbital flight, primarily intended to test the spacecraft's heat shield. It was launched on a Titan II GLV rocket. The spacecraft used for the Gemini 2 mission was later refurbished into the Gemini B configuration, and was subsequently launched on another suborbital flight, along with OPS 0855, as a test for the US Air Force Manned Orbital Laboratory. Gemini spacecraft no. 2 was the first craft to make more than one spaceflight since the X-15, and the only one until a Soviet VA spacecraft was reused in 1978. Gemini Spacecraft no. 2 would remain the only American spacecraft to be reused since the X-15 until Space Shuttle Columbia flew its second mission in 1981; it would also be the only American space capsule to be reused until Crew Dragon Endeavour was launched a second time in 2021.

== Mission history ==
=== GLV ===
The Titan II/Gemini launch vehicle was dismantled to protect it from two hurricanes in August and September 1964. The second stage of the vehicle was taken down and stored in a hangar on August 26, 1964, in preparation for Hurricane Cleo, and the entire launch vehicle was subsequently dismantled and removed from Cape Kennedy Air Force Station's Launch Complex 19 in early September before Hurricane Dora passed over Cape Kennedy on September 9. The Gemini launch vehicle was erected for the final time on 12 September 1964.

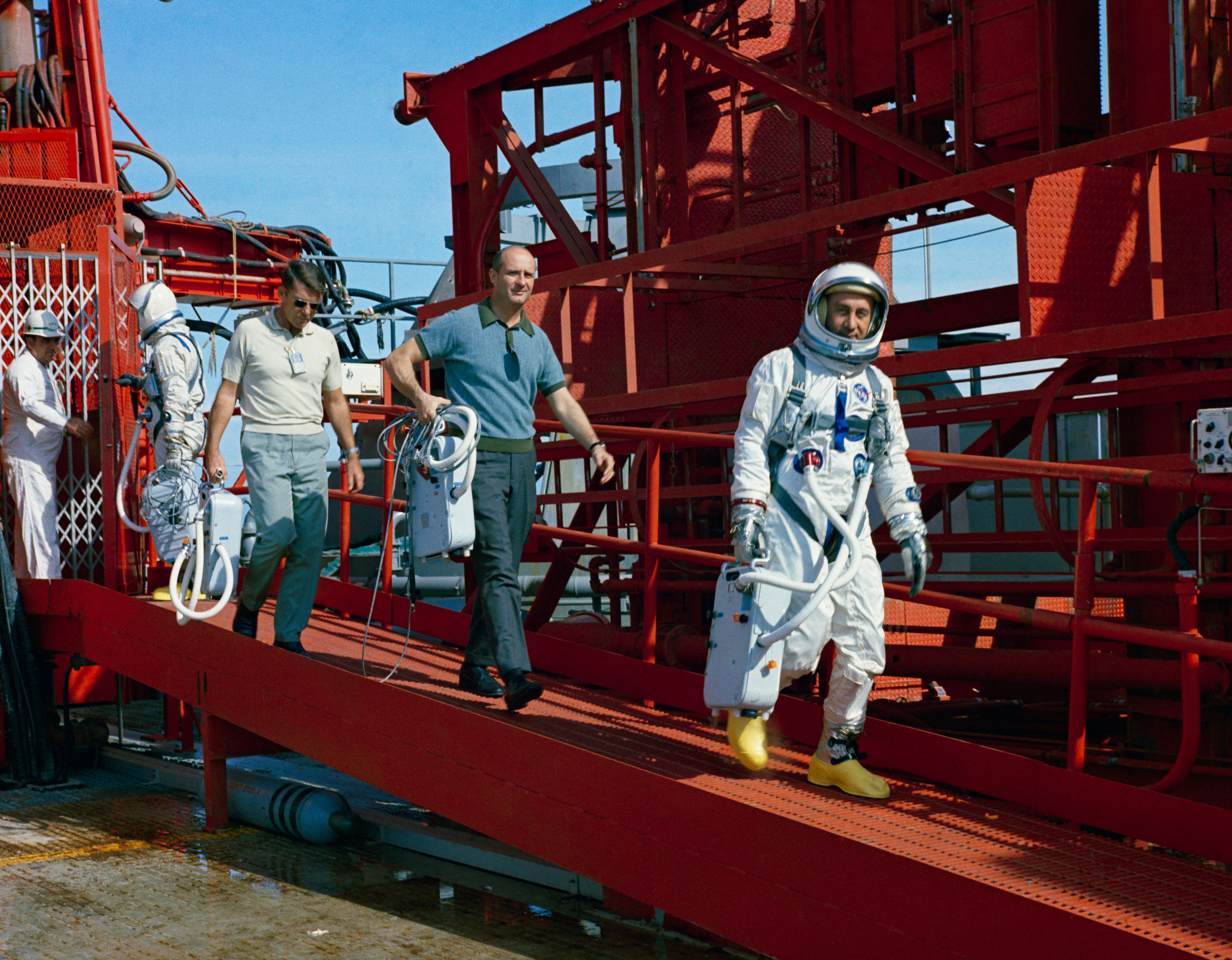
The prime and backup crews for Gemini 3, John Young (suited), Wally Schirra, Thomas P. Stafford (in shirtsleeves), and Gus Grissom (suited), practice egress from the Gemini 2 pad, in preparation for the upcoming Gemini 3 flight

Many ground tests were carried out on the Gemini 2 and Titan rocket in November 1964. On November 24, Gemini-Titan (GT) 2 successfully completed the Wet Mock Simulated Launch, a full-scale countdown exercise which included propellant loading. Procedures for flight crew suiting and spacecraft ingress and egress were practiced during simulated launch. The prime flight crew for Gemini 3 donned pressure suits and full biomedical instrumentation, assisted by their backup crew and the space suit bioinstrumentation and aeromedical personnel who would participate in the GT-3 launch operation. As a result of this practice operation, it was established that all physical examinations, bioinstrumentation sensor attachment, and suit donning would be done in the pilot ready room at Launch Complex 16.

Gemini 2 had been scheduled for launch on December 9, 1964. On that date, the countdown reached zero and the first stage engines were ignited. The launch vehicle's Malfunction Detection System detected technical problems due to a loss of hydraulic pressure and shut down the engines about one second after ignition.

On the second launch attempt on January 19, 1965, Gemini 2 lifted off from Launch Complex 19 at Cape Kennedy at 14:03:59.861 UTC (9:04 am EST).

Shortly after launch the Mission Control Center suffered a power outage. Control of the mission was transferred to a tracking ship. The outage was later traced to an overload of the electrical system from the network television equipment used to cover the launch.

Gemini 2 flew a ballistic suborbital arc over the Atlantic Ocean reaching a maximum altitude of 171.1 kilometers (106.3 mi; 92.4 nmi). The spacecraft was run by an onboard automatic sequencer. At 6 minutes 54 seconds after launch, retrorockets were fired. The spacecraft landed 3,422.4 kilometers (2,126.6 mi; 1,847.9 nmi) downrange from the launch pad at 14:22:14 UTC (9:22:14 am EST). The flight lasted 18 minutes 16 seconds. The landing was 26 kilometers (16 mi; 14 nmi) short of the planned impact point, and 45 nautical miles (83 km) from the recovery aircraft carrier, USS Lake Champlain. The spacecraft was brought aboard the carrier at 15:52 UTC (10:52 am EST). Most goals were achieved, except the fuel cells had failed before liftoff and were turned off. The spacecraft cooling system temperature also was found to be too high. The Gemini 2 spacecraft was in excellent condition. Its heat shield and retrorockets functioned as expected. The Gemini 2 mission was supported by 6,562 United States Department of Defense personnel, 67 aircraft, and 16 ships.

Gemini 2 had flight instrumentation pallets installed in the crew cabin, similar to those in Gemini 1.

=== MOL ===
The Gemini 2 reentry module was refurbished and flown again on November 3, 1966, in a test flight for the United States Air Force Manned Orbiting Laboratory program. It was launched on a Titan IIIC rocket on a 33-minute suborbital flight from LC-40 at Cape Kennedy. It is the only Gemini spacecraft to have flown with U.S. Air Force insignia, but there is an unflown Gemini B spacecraft in USAF markings on display at the National Museum of the United States Air Force at Wright-Patterson Air Force Base in Dayton, Ohio.

== Gallery ==
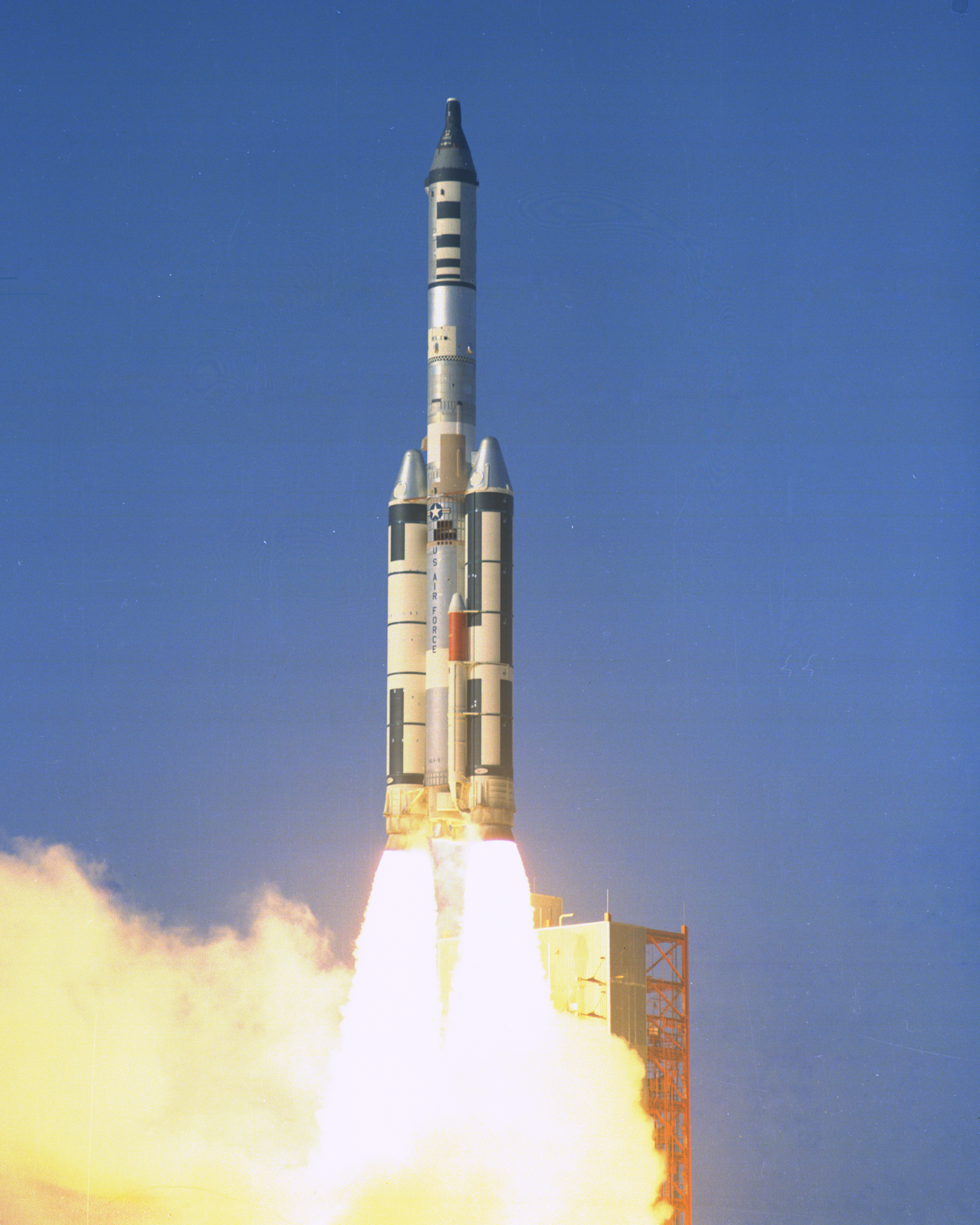
SC2 is launched for a second time aboard a Titan 3C in November 1966, on a suborbital test flight for the USAF MOL project.

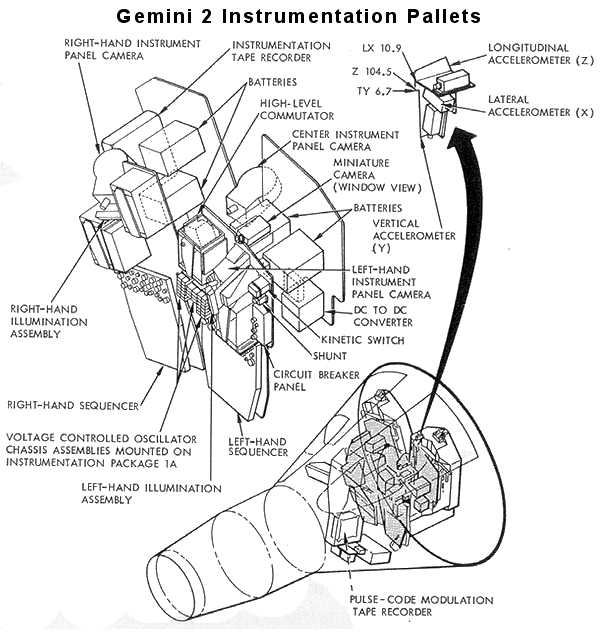
Gemini 2 instrument pallets (NASA)

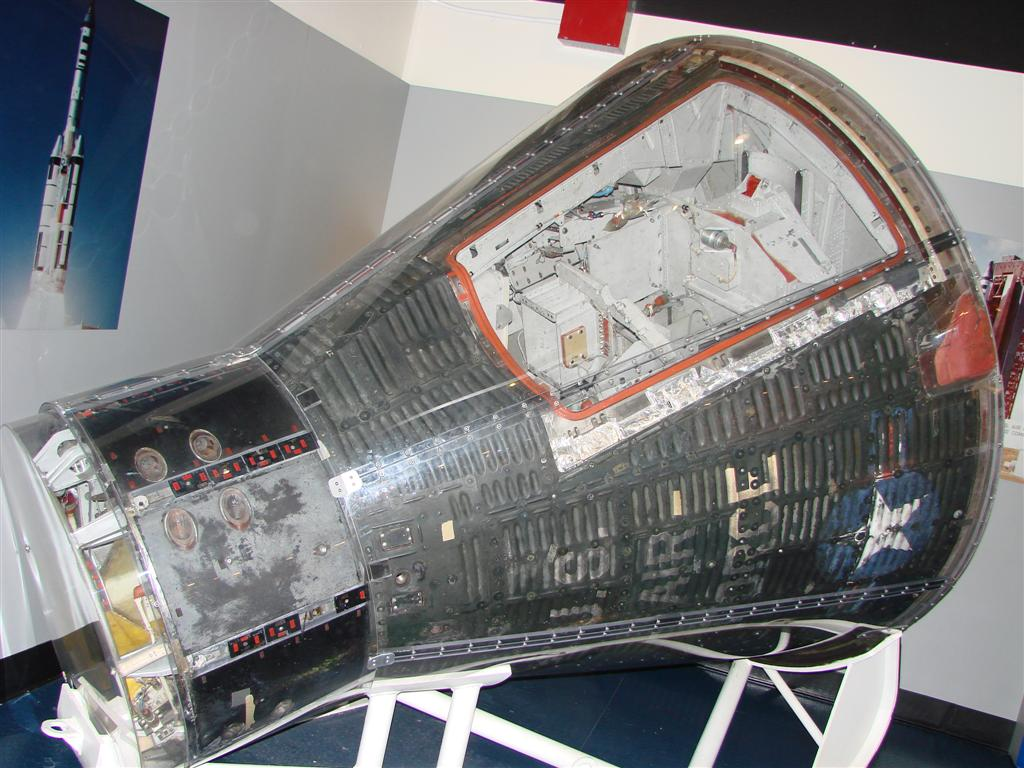
Gemini 2 spacecraft on display at the Air Force Space and Missile Museum, Cape Canaveral Air Force Station, Florida.

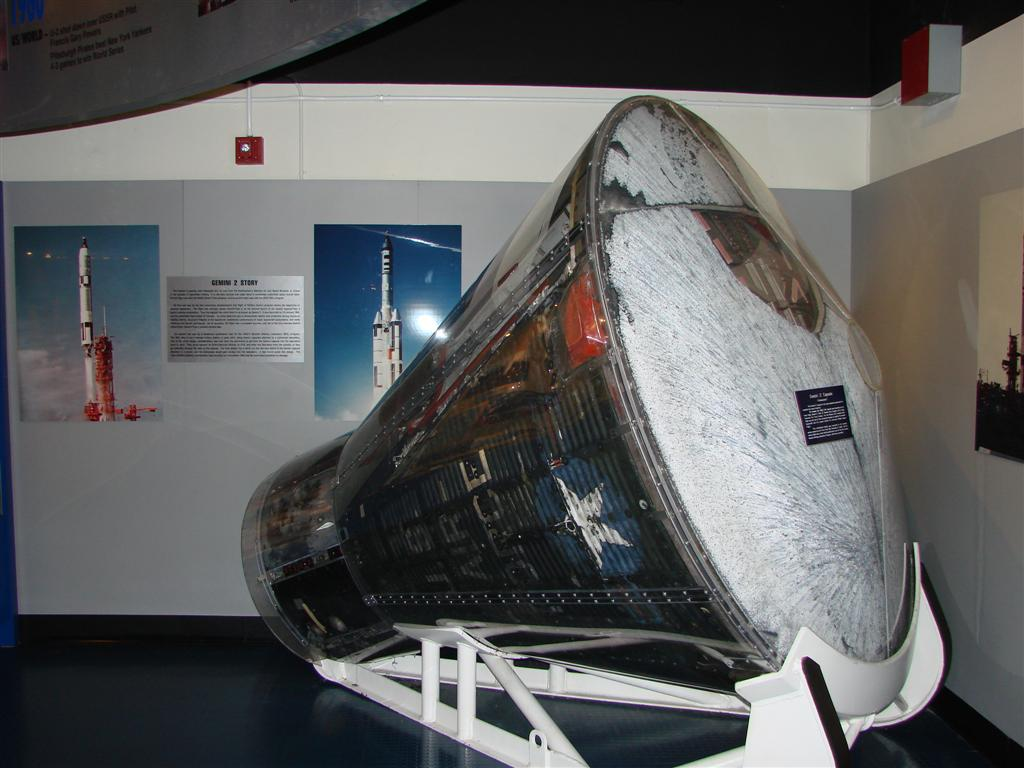
Gemini 2 spacecraft on display at the Air Force Space and Missile Museum, Cape Canaveral.

== See also ==
- Gemini program
- Manned Orbiting Laboratory
- Titan (rocket family)
- Titan III
- List of NASA missions
- Splashdown (spacecraft landing)
