= Cape Canaveral Launch Complex 19 =

Project Gemini launch facility

Launch Complex 19
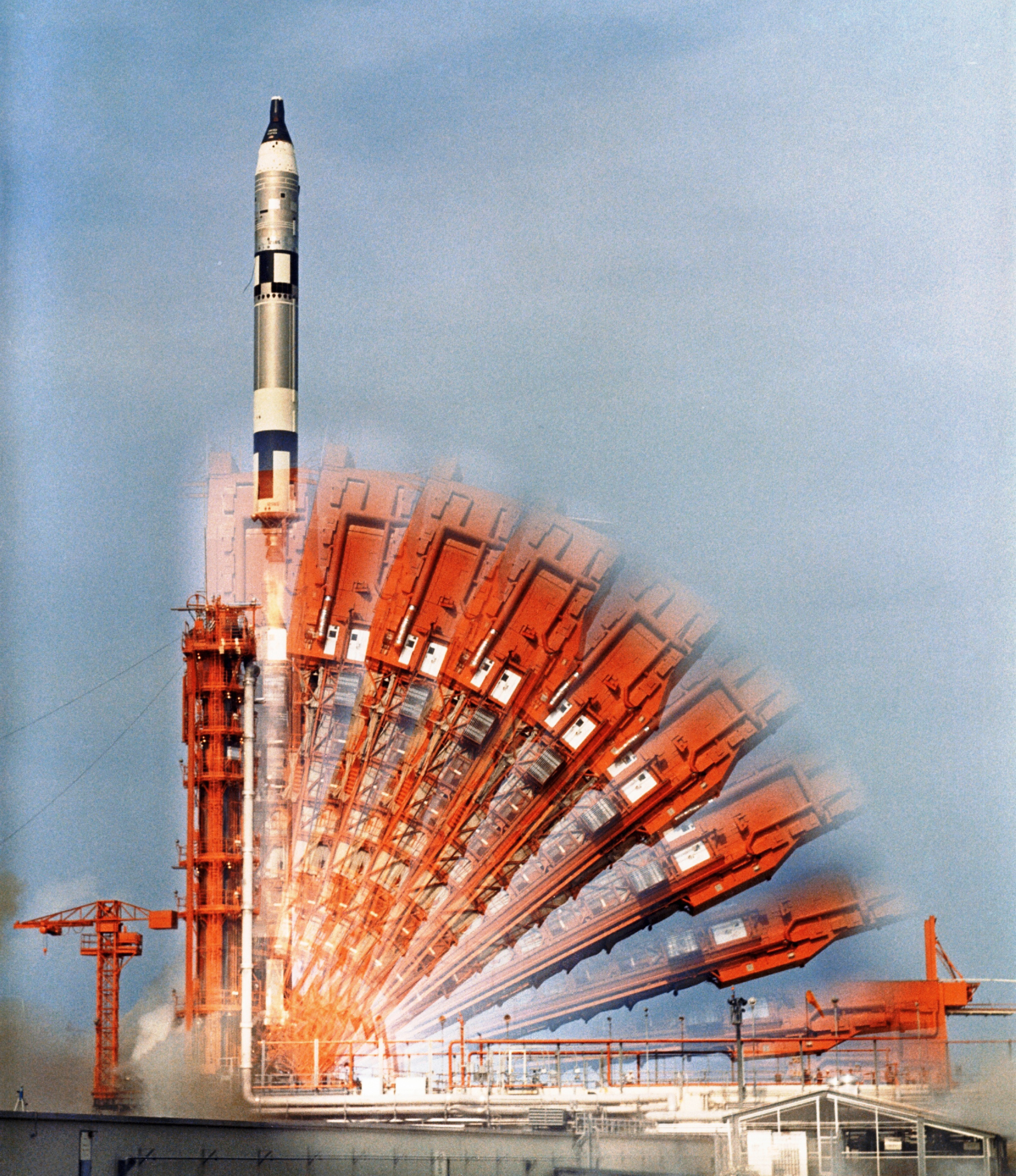
- A multiple exposure photograph of the configuration of Pad 19 up until the launch of Gemini 10.
- Interactive map of Launch Complex 19
- Launch site: Cape Canaveral Space Force Station
- Location: 28°30′24″N 80°33′15″W
- Time zone: UTC−05:00 (EST)
  - Summer (DST): UTC−04:00 (EDT)
- Short name: LC-19
- Operator: United States Space Force
- Total launches: 27
- Launch pad: 1
- Orbital inclination range: 28° - 57°
Launch history
- Status: Inactive
- First launch: August 14, 1959; HGM-25A Titan I
- Last launch: November 11, 1966; Titan II GLV / Gemini XII
- Associated rockets: HGM-25A Titan I LGM-25C Titan II; Titan II GLV

Launch sites at Cape Canaveral Space Force Station and Kennedy Space Center
Active pads
Inactive leased pads
Inactive unleased pads
Repurposed pads, not used for launches
1 LC-39B
2 LC-39A
3 LC-48
4 SLC-41
5 SLC-40
6 LC-47
7 SLC-37
8 LC-34
9 SLC-20
10 LC-19
11 LC-16
12 LC-15
13 LC-14
14 LC-13 (LZ-2)
15 LC-12
16 LC-11
17 LC-36
18 LC-1, LC-2, LC-3, and LC-4
19 SLC-46
20 LC-21 and LC-22
21 LC-31 and LC-32
22 LC-18
23 SLC-17
24 LC-26
25 LC-5 and LC-6
26 LC-30
27 LC-25
28 LC-29

Launch Complex 19 (LC-19) is a deactivated launch site on Cape Canaveral Space Force Station, Florida. One of the eight pads considered part of Missile Row, it is most famous for being used as part of Project Gemini, being the launch site of all ten crewed missions in 1965 and 1966. Additionally, it was used for tests of the HGM-25A Titan I in the late 1950s and early 1960s.

== History ==
Launch Complex 19 was originally built from 1957 to 1959 for the United States Air Force as part of the Titan I missile program, being used for test launches alongside LC-20 to the north and LC-15 and LC-16 to the south. The first launch out of the complex was made on August 14, 1959, when a Titan I exploded on the pad thanks to a premature engine shutdown after liftoff. This extensively damaged LC-19, which took a few months to repair before the first successful flight occurred on February 2, 1960. Going from 1959 to 1962, the complex saw a total of 15 launches of the Titan I, all of them being suborbital flights and 12 of them being labeled as successes.

On January 29, 1962, the Air Force launched their final Titan I from LC-19, as the ICBM was slated to be replaced by the hypergolic fueled LGM-25C Titan II. Unlike the previous era where all four Titan pads were used for missile tests, the military decided to only utilize LC-15 and 16 for that purpose at Cape Canaveral. Later in the year, NASA announced that they had chosen LC-19 to be the launch site of Project Gemini, of which its eponymous spacecraft would make use of a human-rated Titan II named the Titan II GLV.

As part of Gemini, the facility underwent various modifications to support crewed spaceflight. Most notably, the booster erector had a white room installed at the top in order to support the egress of astronauts. The first launch in this configuration (and the first orbital launch from the complex) occurred on April 8, 1964 for Gemini 1, an uncrewed mission that tested both the capsule's structural integrity and the flight-worthiness of the GLV. LC-19 joined LC-5 and LC-14 as the third pad at the Cape to support a crewed spaceflight with the launch of Gemini 3 on March 23, 1965, which carried Gus Grissom and John Young into low Earth orbit.

Throughout the entirety of the program, LC-19 was the site of all 12 of the 19 launches associated with Project Gemini (the other seven launching from LC-14), all 12 numbered missions, and all ten missions carrying astronauts. Among the notable flights that started at the facility include the first American spacewalk with Gemini 4, the first close rendezvous with Gemini 7 and 6A, and the first docking with Gemini 8. Also noteworthy was Gemini 11, which set a non-Apollo distance record of 1,374 km (854 mi) from Earth that stood until Polaris Dawn in 2024. The final mission of the program that launched from the complex was Gemini 12, which launched on November 11, 1966 and carried Jim Lovell and Buzz Aldrin into orbit. Following the liftoff, LC-19 was deactivated from use and has sat dormant in the years since.

On May 30, 1977, the launch tower and umbilical used for supporting the Titan launches were demolished in order to prevent dangers associated with rusting. Additionally, LC-19 alongside the rest of Cape Canaveral Air Force Station was designated as a National Historic Landmark in April 1984. The booster erector remained in place until its dismantlement in August 2003, though the white room was partially restored and relocated to the Air Force Space and Missile Museum (now Cape Canaveral Space Force Museum) situated at the sites of LC-26, LC-5, and LC-6.

Currently, LC-19 is the only complex in Missile Row that has not previously been leased to a NewSpace company, and is currently sandwiched between Firefly Aerospace's lease of SLC-20 and Relativity Space's presence at LC-16. However, the United States Space Force has made intentions of leasing the pad out in the near future.

== Launch history ==
=== Statistics ===
- Titan I
- Titan II GLV

=== List of launches ===
All Titan I flights operated by the United States Air Force. All Titan II flights operated by NASA.

No.	Date	Time (UTC)	Launch Vehicle	Mission/Payload	Result	Remarks
1	14 August 1959	16:00	HGM-25A Titan I	Suborbital test	Failure	First launch from LC-19. Release mechanism failure resulted in earlier than planned liftoff, leading to engines shutting down early and rocket falling back onto pad.
2	2 February 1960	18:08	HGM-25A Titan I	Suborbital test	Success	First successful launch from LC-19.
3	10 August 1960	22:46	HGM-25A Titan I	Suborbital test	Success	
4	28 September 1960	Unknown	HGM-25A Titan I	Suborbital test	Success	
5	24 October 1960	23:16	HGM-25A Titan I	Suborbital test	Success	
6	20 January 1961	20:53	HGM-25A Titan I	Suborbital test	Failure	Anomalous disconnect of launch pad umbilical caused failure of second stage ignition.
7	20 February 1961	Unknown	HGM-25A Titan I	Suborbital test	Success	
8	28 March 1961	Unknown	HGM-25A Titan I	Suborbital test	Success	
9	24 June 1961	03:28	HGM-25A Titan I	Suborbital test	Failure	Hydraulics failure in second stage led to loss of rocket's control.
10	25 July 1961	19:05	HGM-25A Titan I	Suborbital test	Success	
11	8 September 1961	Unknown	HGM-25A Titan I	Suborbital test	Success	
12	7 October 1961	01:30	HGM-25A Titan I	Suborbital test	Success	
13	19 November 1961	Unknown	HGM-25A Titan I	Suborbital test	Success	
14	15 December 1961	Unknown	HGM-25A Titan I	Suborbital test	Success	
15	29 January 1962	23:30	HGM-25A Titan I	Suborbital test	Success	Final Titan I flight from LC-19.
16	8 April 1964	16:00	Titan II GLV	Gemini 1	Success	First flight of Project Gemini and maiden flight of the Titan II GLV. First civilian launch from LC-19 and first orbital launch from LC-19. Gemini spacecraft remained attached to second stage, and holes were drilled into heat shield to ensure breakup on reentry.
17	19 January 1965	14:04	Titan II GLV	Gemini 2	Success	Suborbital launch. First flight of an operational Gemini spacecraft. Capsule Gemini SC-2 was later reused on the only Manned Orbiting Laboratory mission, OPS-0855.
18	23 March 1965	14:24	Titan II GLV	Gemini 3	Success	First crewed launch of Project Gemini and from LC-19. First American crewed flight with multiple astronauts, with Gus Grissom and John Young on board.
19	3 June 1965	15:16	Titan II GLV	Gemini 4	Success	Conducted first American spacewalk, being done by astronaut Ed White. First multiday American spaceflight, lasting for four days.
20	21 August 1965	14:00	Titan II GLV	Gemini 5	Success	Set record for crewed duration in space, at 7 days 22 hours. Flight cut short by a day because of Hurricane Betsy.
21	4 December 1965	19:30	Titan II GLV	Gemini 7	Success	Originally intended to fly after Gemini 6. Set record for crewed duration in space, at 13 days 18 hours. Participated in first crewed rendezvous in space with Gemini 6A.
22	15 December 1965	13:37	Titan II GLV	Gemini 6A	Success	Originally intended to dock with an Agena Target Vehicle, but plans were changed after ATV launch failed. Participated in first crewed rendezvous in space with Gemini 7.
23	16 March 1966	16:41	Titan II GLV	Gemini 8	Success	First docking in space, docking with an Agena Target Vehicle. First orbital flight of an American civilian, astronaut Neil Armstrong. Mission cut short following failure of a thruster, causing spacecraft to dangerously tumble.
24	3 June 1966	13:39	Titan II GLV	Gemini 9A	Success	Mission to dock with the Augmented Target Docking Adapter. Originally intended to dock with an Agena Target Vehicle, but plans were changed after ATV launch failed. Flew backup crew after prime crew members Elliot See and Charles Bassett died in a plane crash. Docking called off following discovery of ATDA's fairings failing to separate.
25	18 July 1966	22:20	Titan II GLV	Gemini 10	Success	Mission to dock with an Agena Target Vehicle. First completely successful mission involving an ATV. First double rendezvous, visiting both their and Gemini 8's ATV, and performed first burn of a spacecraft while docked.
26	12 September 1966	14:42	Titan II GLV	Gemini 11	Success	Mission to dock with an Agena Target Vehicle. Performed first direct-ascent rendezvous. First test with artificial gravity in space, using a tether between the Gemini spacecraft and ATV. Set a non-Lunar crewed altitude record of 1,374 km that stood until Polaris Dawn in 2024.
27	11 November 1966	20:46	Titan II GLV	Gemini 12	Success	Mission to dock with an Agena Target Vehicle. Orbital boost was cancelled due to engine problem after insertion into low Earth orbit. Final flight of Project Gemini, and final launch of the Titan II GLV. Most recent launch from LC-19.

== Gallery ==
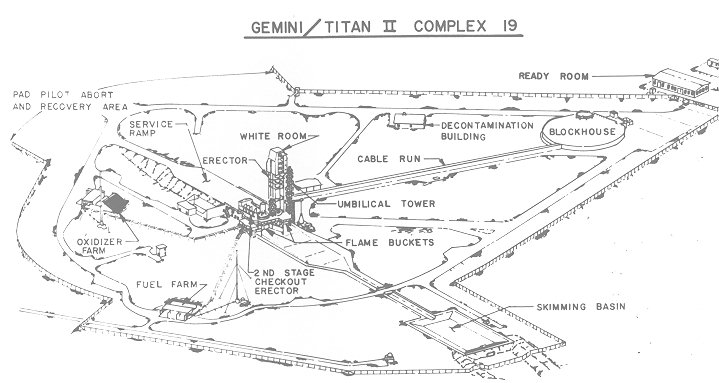
Diagram of Complex 19.

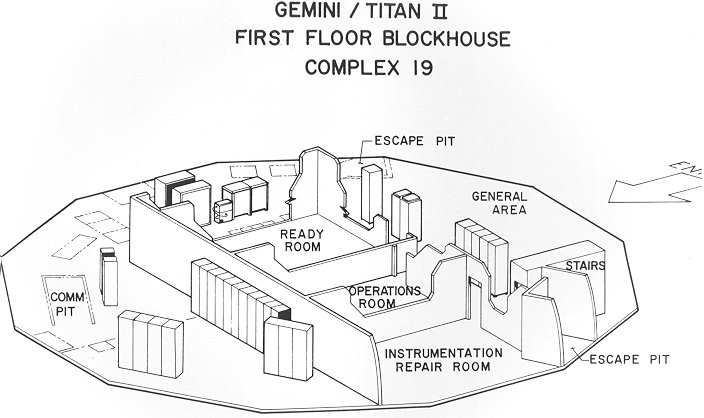
Diagram of the blockhouse at Complex 19.

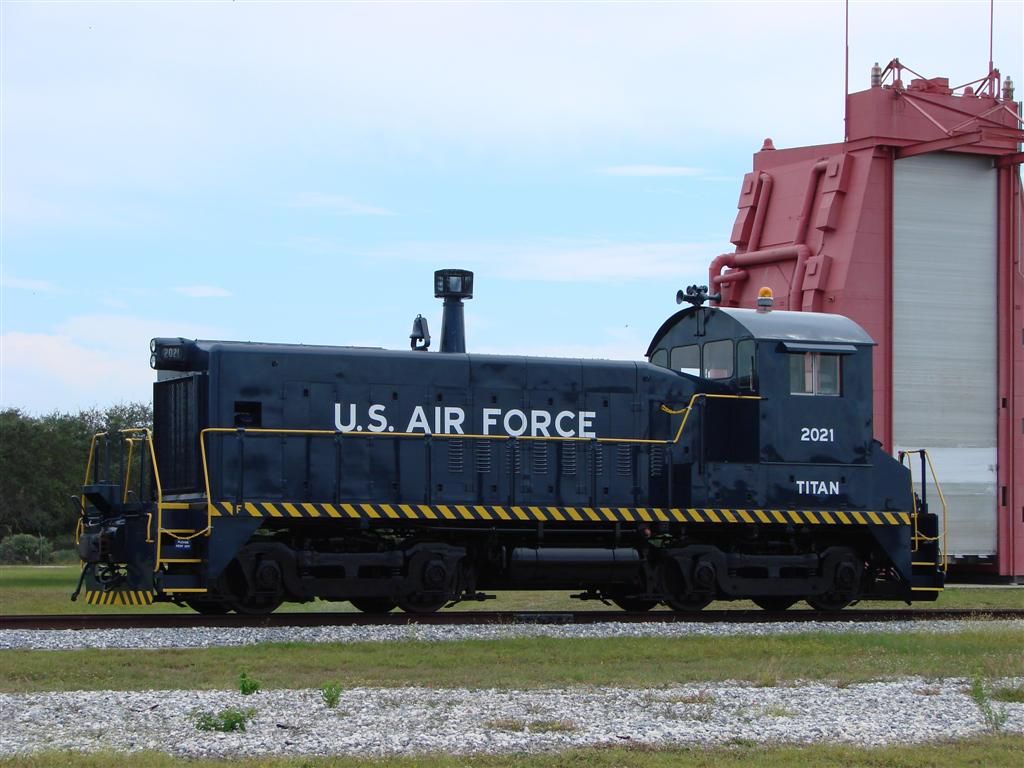
LC-19 white room is in the right background, on display at the Air Force Space and Missile Museum.

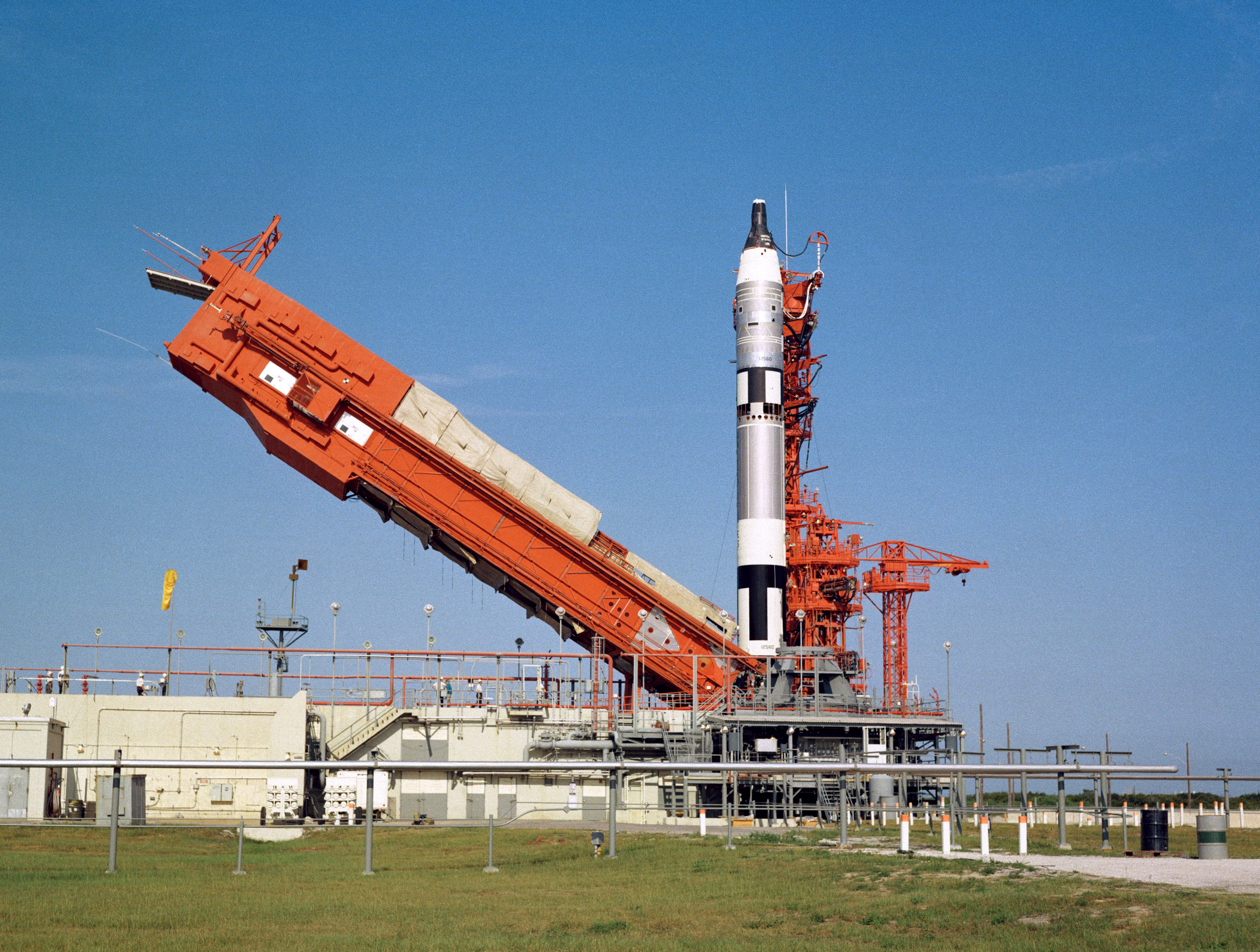
The erector is lowered in preparation for the launch of Gemini 5.

== See also ==
- Gemini Program
  - Gemini 1
  - Gemini 2
  - Gemini 3
  - Gemini 4
  - Gemini 5
  - Gemini 7
  - Gemini 6A
  - Gemini 8
  - Gemini 9A
  - Gemini 10
  - Gemini 11
  - Gemini 12
- Titan I
- Titan II
