= Gemini 1 =

First Gemini program spacelaunch

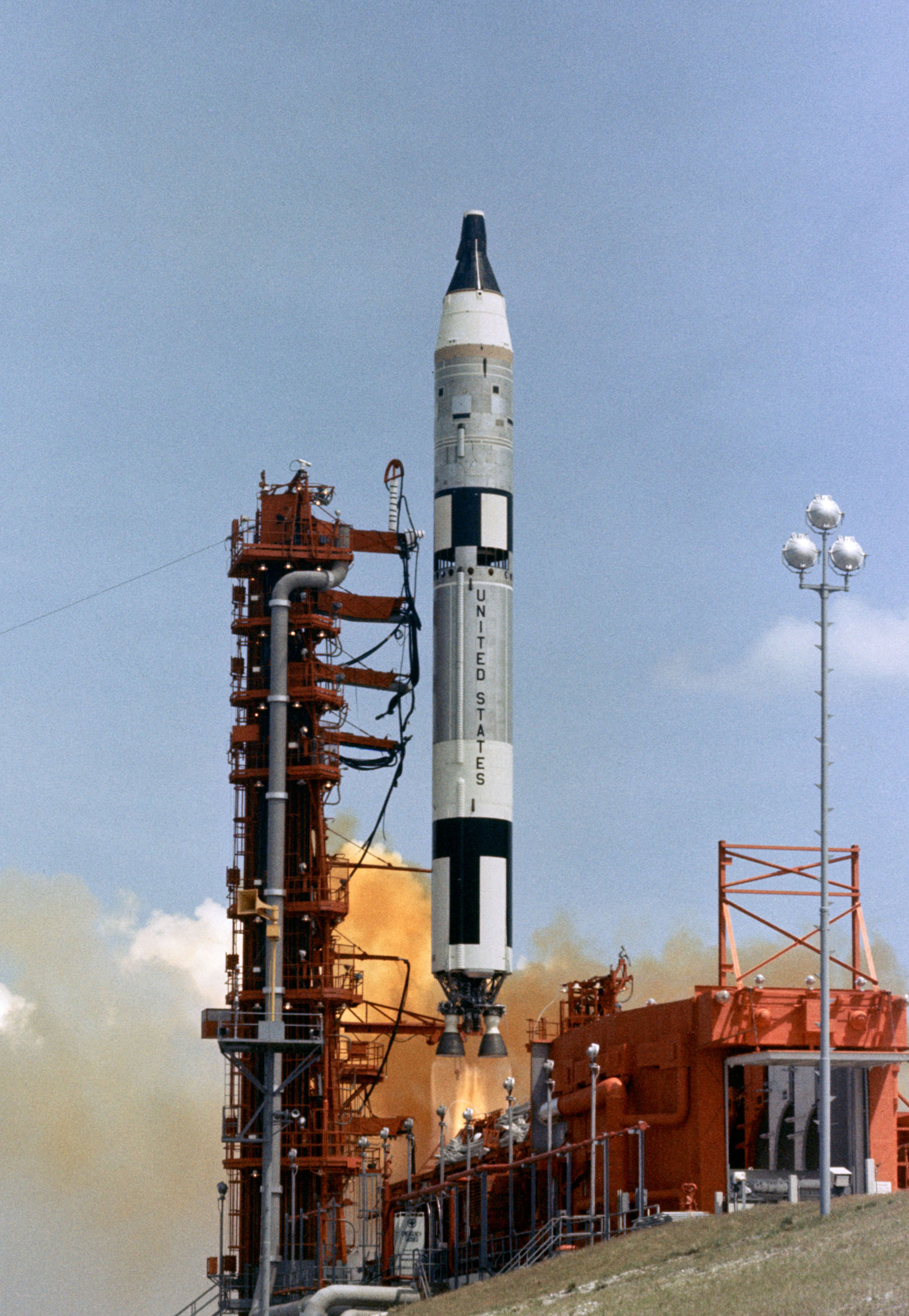
- Launch of Gemini 1
- Mission type: Flight test
- Operator: NASA
- COSPAR ID: 1964-018A
- SATCAT no.: 00782
- Mission duration: Flight test: 4 hours, 50 minutes Launch to reentry: 4 days, 4 hours
- Distance travelled: 2,789,864 km (1,733,541 mi; 1,506,406 nmi)
- Orbits completed: 63

Spacecraft properties
- Spacecraft: Gemini SC1
- Manufacturer: McDonnell
- Launch mass: 3,187 kg (7,026 lb); 5,170 kg (11,400 lb) with 2nd stage

Start of mission
- Launch date: April 8, 1964, 16:00:01 UTC (11:00:01 am EST)
- Rocket: Titan II GLV, s/n 62-12556
- Launch site: Cape Kennedy, LC-19

End of mission
- Disposal: Uncontrolled reentry
- Decay date: April 12, 1964, 21:00:00 UTC
- Landing site: Middle of South Atlantic Ocean

Orbital parameters
- Reference system: Geocentric
- Regime: Low Earth orbit
- Perigee altitude: 155 km (96 mi; 84 nmi)
- Apogee altitude: 271 km (168 mi; 146 nmi)
- Inclination: 32.5°
- Period: 88.76 minutes
- Epoch: April 10, 1964

Gemini 1 was the first mission in NASA's Gemini program. An uncrewed test flight of the Gemini spacecraft, its main objectives were to test the structural integrity of the new spacecraft and modified Titan II launch vehicle. It was also the first test of the new tracking and communication systems for the Gemini program and provided training for the ground support crews for the first crewed missions.

Originally scheduled for launch in December 1963, difficulties in the development of both the spacecraft and its booster caused four months of delay. Gemini 1 was launched from Launch Complex 19 at Cape Kennedy (now Canaveral), Florida on April 8, 1964. The spacecraft stayed attached to the second stage of the rocket. The mission lasted for three orbits while test data were taken, but the spacecraft stayed in space for almost 64 orbits until its orbit decayed due to atmospheric drag. The spacecraft was not intended to be recovered, and holes were drilled through its heat shield to ensure it would not survive re-entry.

== Background ==
Project Gemini was conceived as a bridge between America's single-seat Project Mercury and the three-seat Project Apollo. With a design largely extrapolated from its predecessor, the Gemini spacecraft would allow two astronauts to conduct the maneuvers inherent in Apollo's lunar mission: rendezvous, docking, and changing of orbit. Moreover, Gemini would support astronauts in space for extended flights, approximating the expected length of the Apollo missions.

Its two-person capacity and greater capabilities meant that Gemini would be a substantially heavier spacecraft than Mercury had been — too heavy to be lofted into orbit by Mercury's Atlas rocket. A replacement was needed. The newly developed Titan II ICBM (which had also been tapped by the Air Force for its X-20 spaceplane project) was an attractive replacement. It had a thrust some two and a half times that of the Atlas, a far simpler mechanical construction, and the ability to store propellants indefinitely. Moreover, the Titan II's propellants mixed less violently than those of Atlas meaning a booster explosion, should it happen, would be less violent. This made obsolete the heavy escape tower used in the Mercury program; instead, ejection seats could be used.

The primary goal of the first Gemini mission was to flight test the modified Titan II launch vehicle and the basic structural soundness of the Gemini capsule under launch and orbital conditions. Consequently, the first Gemini capsule could be a largely boilerplate structure. Secondary goals of the mission included testing the remote guidance systems, the Titan's redundancy systems, and evaluation of the Gemini-Titan malfunction detection system.

== Pre-flight ==
Gemini Spacecraft Number 1 was built specifically for the uncrewed mission. Most internal systems were replaced with dummies and ballast approximating the weight and balance of the crewed spacecraft. In place of the crew couches, two pallets of instruments were installed for the relaying via telemetry of the pressure, vibration, acceleration, temperature, and structural loads experienced during the short flight. A spacecraft heat shield was installed, but four large holes were drilled in it to ensure Gemini 1 was destroyed during reentry.

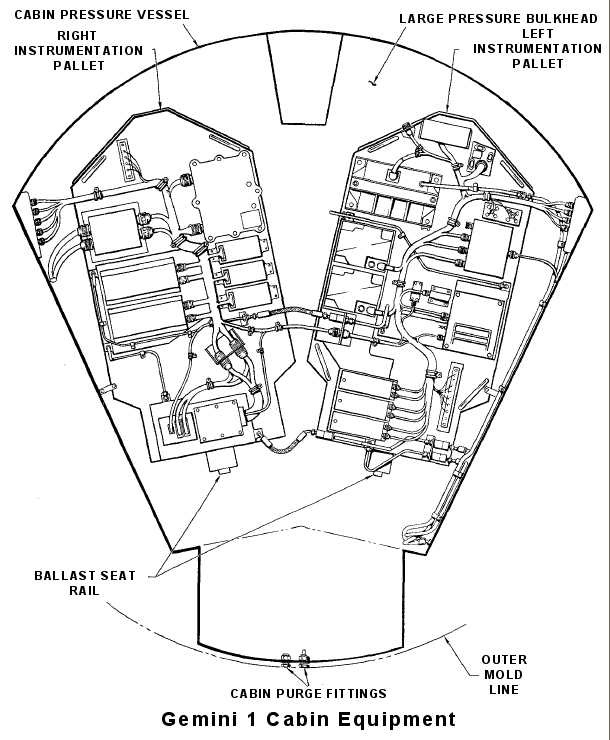
Gemini 1 Instrument Pallets

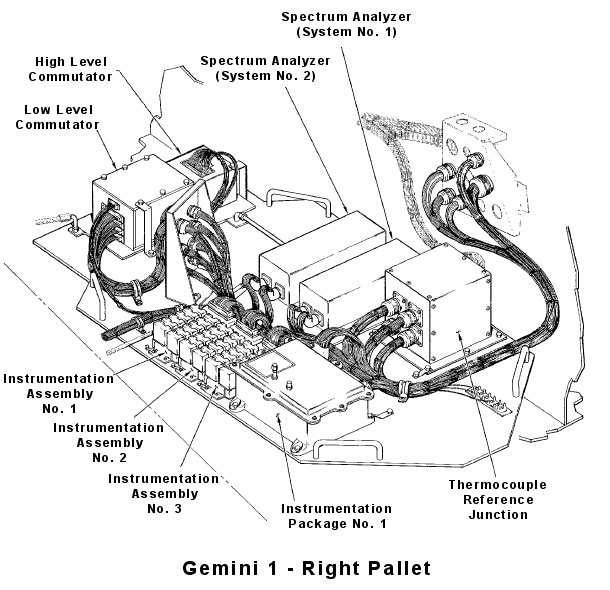
Gemini 1 Right Pallet

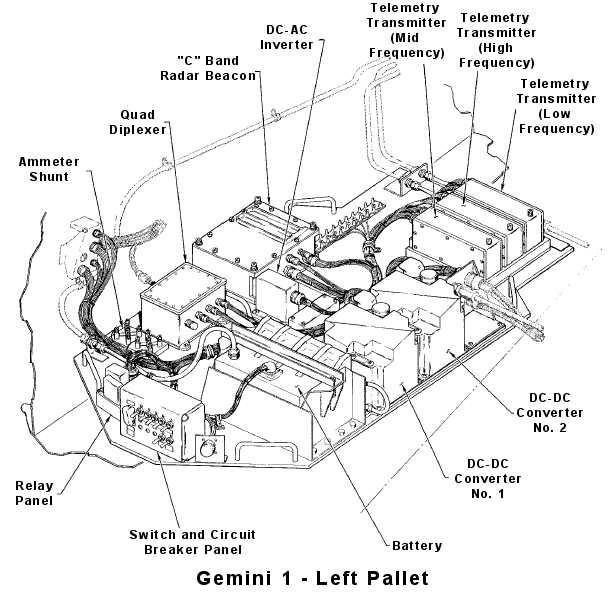
Gemini 1 Left Pallet

Even with the simplified systems, this first Gemini encountered several weeks of delay in testing. Nevertheless, it was not the spacecraft that caused the launch date, originally planned for December 1963, to slip. Rather, it was the testing and man-rating of the Titan II launch vehicle. Assembled on May 21, 1963, the first Titan-Gemini launch vehicle required comprehensive testing and retesting, and it was not until October that it was ready for transport to the launch site — where considerable preparation still had to be done. Moreover, there was concern that the Titan II produced too much vertical oscillation (pogo) to be usable at all, and consideration was given to using the Saturn I rocket instead, at least for the first missions. However, on November 1, 1963, the Air Force flew a Titan II rocket with standpipes in its oxidizer lines and mechanical accumulators in its fuel lines, which suppressed the pogo effect.

Inefficient project management threatened to further delay the first Gemini launch, which by November had already been pushed back to February 28, 1964. Gemini Manager Charles Mathews united the several disparate teams into a single Gemini Launch Vehicle Coordination Committee with clearly defined management and communication channels. This measure ensured that no more time would be lost due to uncertain authority, duplicated effort, or conflicting decisions. Still, issues that arose during testing caused the launch date to slip further. The Titan II booster was not ready for final readiness testing until March 3, 1964, the same day that Gemini Spacecraft Number 1 arrived at the launch complex for mating with its booster. Faulty test equipment caused a further delay of two weeks. By late March, all serious hurdles cleared, Gemini 1's launch date was set for April 7. The resolution of a failure in the secondary autopilot caused one last day of delay. Finally, by noon of the seventh, Gemini 1's Mission Review Board determined unanimously that all systems were cleared for flight.

== Mission and results ==
After a flawless countdown, Gemini 1's Titan II booster lifted off from Cape Kennedy's (now Canaveral) Launch Complex 19 at 11:00:01 EDT, April 8, 1964. The first stage was jettisoned after two and a half minutes with the rocket 64 kilometers (40 mi; 35 nmi) high and 91 kilometers (57 mi; 49 nmi) downrange. At that moment, there was an unexpected three-second loss of signal from the craft. It was later determined that this brief communications blackout was caused by charged ions from the separation and startup of the second stage, similar to the blackout during spacecraft reentry. All subsequent Gemini flights would have the same brief blackout.

The spacecraft achieved orbit five and a half minutes after launch. The launch vehicle had imparted an excess 7 meters (24 feet) per second of velocity to the Gemini 1, placing the spacecraft into an orbit with an apogee of 320 kilometers (200 mi; 170 nmi) instead of the planned 299 kilometers (186 mi; 161 nmi). This lengthened Gemini 1's lifespan from the planned three and a half days to four.

The formal mission of Gemini 1 was over long before that. Its battery had only been designed to last a single orbit, and only the first three orbits — lasting four hours and 50 minutes — were part of the flight plan. Gemini 1 and its attached second stage were tracked by the Manned Space Flight Network until they reentered over the South Atlantic, midway between South America and Africa, on April 12, 1964, during their 64th orbit.

As a result of the successful flight, the Titan II was considered "man-rated" (safe for use in human spaceflight). Man-rating the Gemini capsule itself would not be accomplished until the launch of Gemini 2 nine months later, on January 19, 1965.

The Gemini 1 mission was supported by 5,176 United States Department of Defense personnel, as well as eleven aircraft and three ships provided by the Department of Defense.
