= Titan II GLV =

American expendable launch system

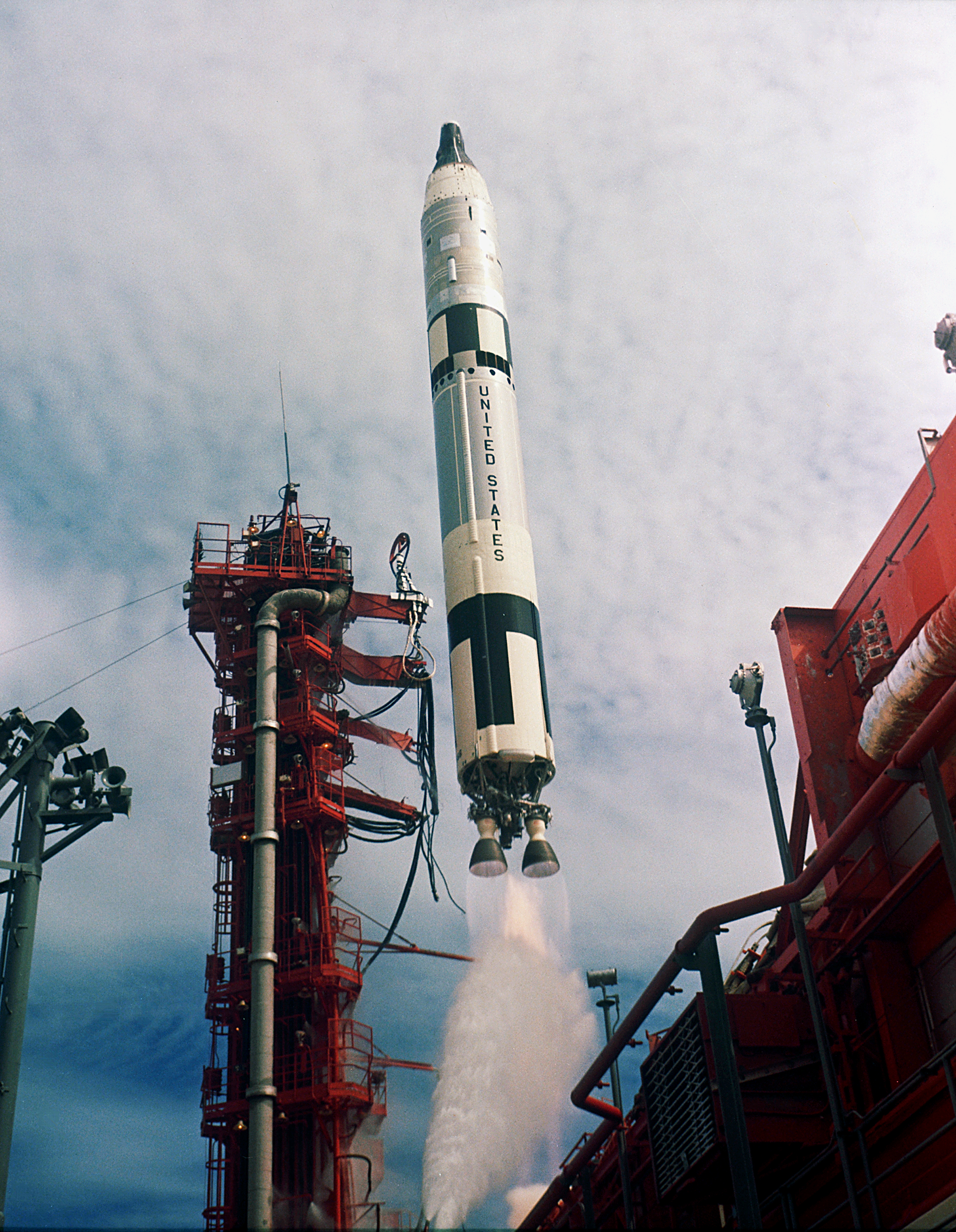
- Launch of Gemini 11 on a Titan II GLV from LC-19
- Function: Human-rated launch vehicle for Gemini spacecraft
- Manufacturer: Martin
- Country of origin: United States

Size
- Height: 109 ft (33 m)
- Diameter: 10 ft (3.0 m)
- Mass: 340,000 lb (150 t)
- Stages: 2

Capacity

Payload to LEO
- Mass: 7,900 lb (3.6 t)

Associated rockets
- Family: Titan

Launch history
- Status: Retired
- Launch sites: Cape Canaveral, LC-19
- Total launches: 12
- Success(es): 12
- First flight: April 8, 1964
- Last flight: November 11, 1966
- Carries passengers or cargo: Gemini

First stage
- Powered by: 1 × LR87-AJ-7
- Maximum thrust: 1,900 kN (430,000 lb_{f})
- Specific impulse: 258 s (2.53 km/s)
- Burn time: 156 seconds
- Propellant: Aerozine 50 / N_{2}O_{4}

Second stage
- Powered by: 1 × LR91-AJ-7
- Maximum thrust: 440 kN (100,000 lb_{f})
- Specific impulse: 316 s (3.10 km/s)
- Burn time: 180 seconds
- Propellant: Aerozine 50 / N_{2}O_{4}

The Titan II GLV (Titan II Gemini Launch Vehicle) or Gemini-Titan II was an American expendable launch system derived from the Titan II missile, which was used to launch twelve Gemini missions for NASA between 1964 and 1966. Two uncrewed launches followed by ten crewed ones were conducted from Launch Complex 19 at the Cape Canaveral Air Force Station, starting with Gemini 1 on April 8, 1964.

The Titan II was a two-stage liquid-fuel rocket, using a hypergolic propellant combination of Aerozine 50 fuel and nitrogen tetroxide oxidizer. The first stage was powered by an LR87 engine (with two combustion chambers and nozzles, fed by separate sets of turbomachinery), and the second stage was propelled by an LR91 engine.

== Modifications from the Titan II missile ==
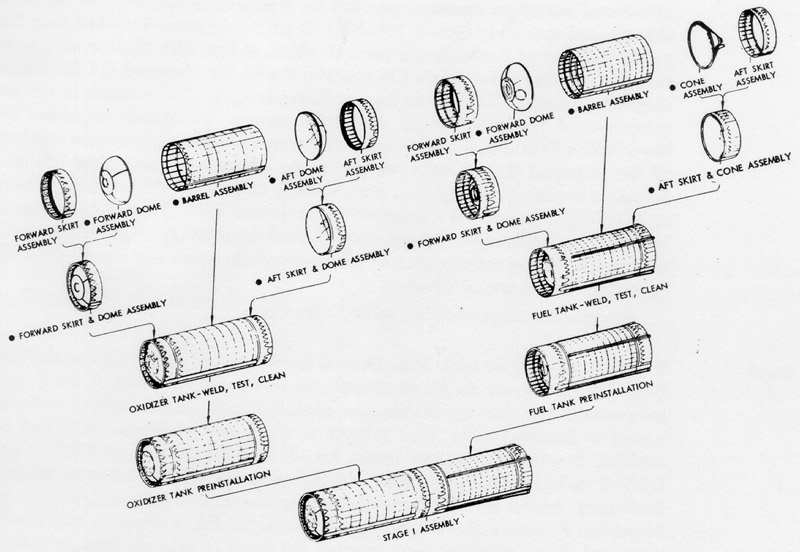
Titan II GLV first stage component assembly scheme.

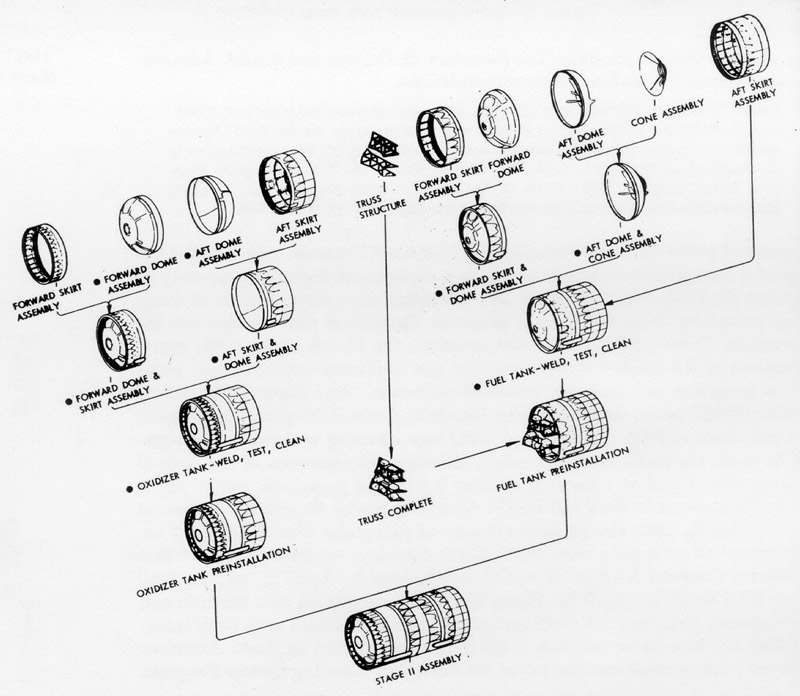
Titan II GLV second stage component assembly scheme.

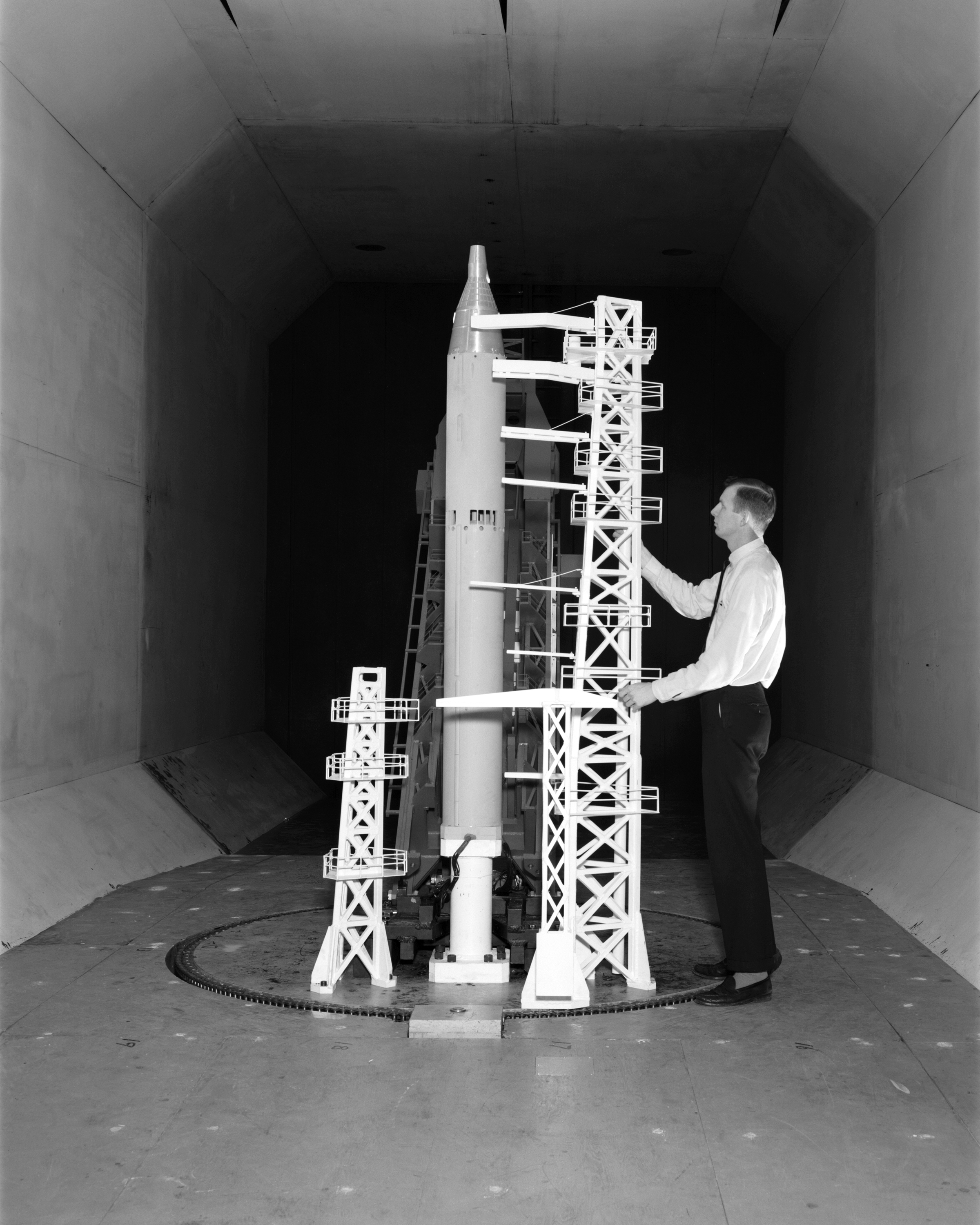
Titan with Gemini capsule in the Transonic Dynamics Tunnel (1964).

In addition to greater payload capability, the Titan II promised greater reliability than the Atlas LV-3B, which had been selected for Project Mercury, because Titan's hypergolic-fueled engines contained far fewer components.

Several modifications were made to the Titan missile to human-rate it for Project Gemini:

- A "Gemini Malfunction Detection System" was installed to inform the crew of the rocket's status, and improve response in an emergency.
- Redundant systems were installed to reduce the chances of launch failures.
- The inertial guidance system was replaced by a lighter-weight ground-radio guidance system
- The avionics truss in the second stage was modified slightly
- To help guard against the possibility of a guidance malfunction causing the engine nozzles to gimbal hard right or left, an extra backup guidance system was added.
- The second stage propellant tanks were lengthened for longer burn time and unnecessary vernier engines and retrorockets were removed. Because the second stage engine had had issues with combustion instability, it was equipped with baffled injectors.
- The first stage was loaded with 13,000 pounds (5.9 t) more propellant than the Titan ICBM although the storage tank size remained unchanged.
- Modifications were made to the tracking, electrical and hydraulics systems in the interest of improved reliability.
- The propellants were chilled to slightly improve vehicle performance. This allowed for more mass to be accommodated.
- First stage engine thrust was reduced slightly to cut down on vibration and G loads.
- First stage engine burn would go until propellant depletion unlike Titan ICBMs which were designed to cut off when propellant flow/pressure and engine thrust started dropping as the tanks emptied. This was to prevent the possibility of a malfunctioning pressure sensor triggering an abort condition. Also, running until depletion would slightly boost the Titan's capacity for payload.

Modifications were overseen by the Air Force Systems Command. The Aerojet company, the manufacturer of the Titan's engines, had released a revised model during mid-1963 due to deficiencies in the original design, and also to attempt to improve manufacturing procedures.

Film footage of Gemini 10's launch revealed that the first stage oxidizer tank ruptured shortly after staging and released a cloud of N_{2}O_{4}. As first stage telemetry had been terminated at staging, there was no data other than photographic/visual evidence to go by, however the conclusion was that either loose debris struck the oxidizer tank dome or else exhaust from the second stage engine had burned through it.

Gemini 12's launch vehicle also experienced a tank rupture after staging and film review of Titan II ICBM launches found several occurrences of this phenomenon. Since this did not appear to pose any safety risks to the astronauts, NASA decided that it was not a concern.

During Titan II ICBM development, it had been found that the first stage turbopump gearbox was prone to total failure caused by resonant vibration in the idler gear. This problem had not occurred on actual launches, but only static firing tests. This was considered to be a critical item to fix. Aerojet developed a totally redesigned gearbox, and all of Gemini launch vehicles except for the uncrewed Gemini 1 used it.

There was also a potentially serious problem with the turbopump bearings which led to more design changes, however the odds of failing on a Gemini launch were slim to nil since GLV boosters used specially selected and tested bearings, in addition the turbopumps would be "hot fired" as part of prelaunch checks

Combustion instability in the second stage engine was also a concern although that too had only been witnessed in static firing runs. A new injector with improved baffling was developed for the engine and flight-tested on a Titan IIIC launch; all GLVs from Gemini 8 onwards incorporated it.

After a Titan II propellant feed line was found to have some damage during factory inspections, NASA put out the requirement that all GLV propellant lines had to be X-rayed in order to prevent a potentially disastrous fuel leak during launch. X-ray tests later found several more damaged propellant lines, most likely due to careless handling.

The most significant issue in man-rating the Titan II was resolving problems with resonant vibration known pogo oscillation (since the action was said to resemble that of a pogo stick), that could produce g-forces sufficient to incapacitate astronauts, but the Air Force were not interested in helping NASA with a problem that did not affect the ICBM program and could potentially delay it, or require major modifications to the design. However, Martin-Marietta argued that the pogo problem could be fixed fairly easily, and also the Air Force began to develop more of an interest in man-rating the Titan II due to the proposed Manned Orbiting Laboratory program. The primary changes made to resolve pogo were adding oxidizer standpipes, increasing the pressure in the propellant tanks, and adding a mechanical accumulator to the fuel suction side.

Another nuisance problem that occurred during the Gemini program was code-named "Green Man" and involved momentary pitch oscillations of the Titan second stage following engine cutoff. This phenomenon had happened on both Gemini and uncrewed Titan II/III flights and had resulted in the failure of the ablative skirt on the second stage at least twice (those instances were dubbed "Brown Man"). Investigation following skirt failure on a Titan IIIC launch concluded that pressure buildup in the ablative skirt caused the pitch oscillations, but NASA decided that there was probably little chance of loose debris from the skirt contacting the Gemini spacecraft, so no corrective action had to be taken and in any case, the Titan IIIC incident was found to be the result of poor quality control which would not affect the more strictly supervised Gemini program.

The assembly of these rockets was done at Martin-Marietta's plant in Baltimore, Maryland, so not to interfere with missile work at the one in Denver, Colorado, although this also saved the former plant from a planned shutdown. As with the Mercury-Atlas launch vehicles, a high degree of workmanship was stressed as well as more thorough testing of components and improved handling procedures compared with Titans designed for uncrewed flights.

== Flights ==
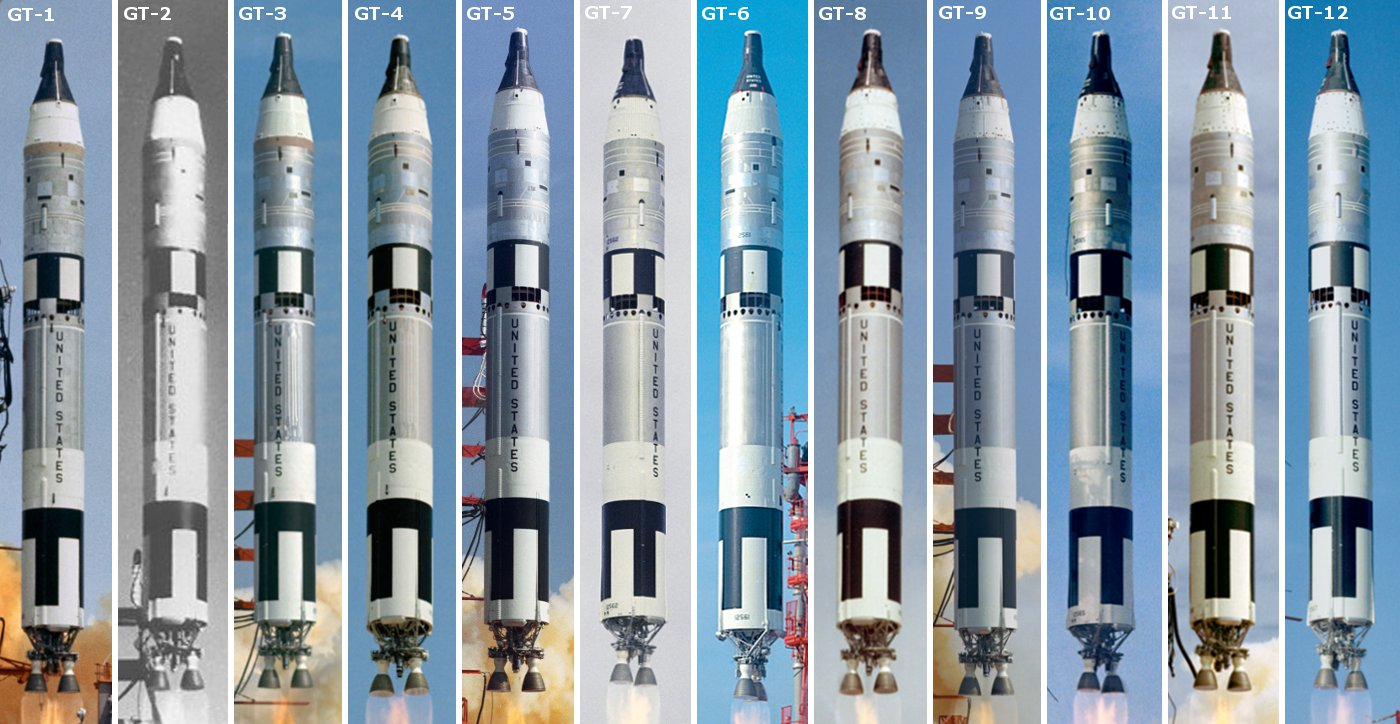
Titan II GLV launches

The Titan II had a much higher thrust-to-weight ratio than the Saturn V. Astronauts experienced almost 6G before the second stage stopped firing at 100 miles (160 km) altitude. Richard F. Gordon Jr. compared the Titan II to "a young fighter pilot's ride. It's faster than the Saturn's old man's ride." Frank Borman said that simulations did not prepare him for the "almost deafening" noise, which he compared to a jet's afterburner or large train. Walter Schirra and Gordon Cooper reported that the ride was smoother than on the Atlas, however.

Mission	LV serial No	Launch date	Crew
GT-1	GLV-1 12556	April 8, 1964	Uncrewed orbital test flight
GT-2	GLV-2 12557	January 19, 1965	Uncrewed suborbital test of Gemini heat shield
GT-3	GLV-3 12558	March 23, 1965	Gus Grissom and John Young
GT-IV	GLV-4 12559	June 3, 1965	James McDivitt and Ed White
GT-V	GLV-5 12560	August 21, 1965	Gordon Cooper and Charles P. Conrad
GT-VII	GLV-7 12562	December 4, 1965	Frank Borman and Jim Lovell
GT-VI A	GLV-6 12561	December 15, 1965	Wally Schirra and Thomas P. Stafford
GT-VIII	GLV-8 12563	March 16, 1966	Neil Armstrong and David Scott
GT-IX A	GLV-9 12564	June 3, 1966	Thomas P. Stafford and Eugene Cernan
GT-X	GLV-10 12565	July 18, 1966	John Young and Michael Collins
GT-XI	GLV-11 12566	September 12, 1966	Charles P. Conrad and Richard F. Gordon
GT-XII	GLV-12 12567	November 11, 1966	Jim Lovell and Edwin "Buzz" Aldrin

== Displays ==
Two retired Titan II missiles are on display repainted as Gemini Launch Vehicles, along with a few replicas.

- A retired Titan II missile, repainted as GLV-3 12558 (Gemini 3), is on display at KSC Rocket Garden since 2010.
- Another retired Titan II missile, repainted as GLV-9 12564 (Gemini 9A), is on display at the Stafford Air & Space Museum.
- A Gemini-Titan II full-scale replica was erected for the 1964 New York World's Fair. It remains on display at the New York Hall of Science, Corona Park, NY.
- Another full size replica is on display at the Kansas Cosmosphere and Space Center.
- A third replica was displayed at the Parque de las Ciencias Luis A. Ferré, Bayamon, PR.
- A mockup, created from two Titan I first stages, was on display at KSC Rocket Garden until 2006. In 2010 this replica was shipped to Johnson Space Center in Texas.
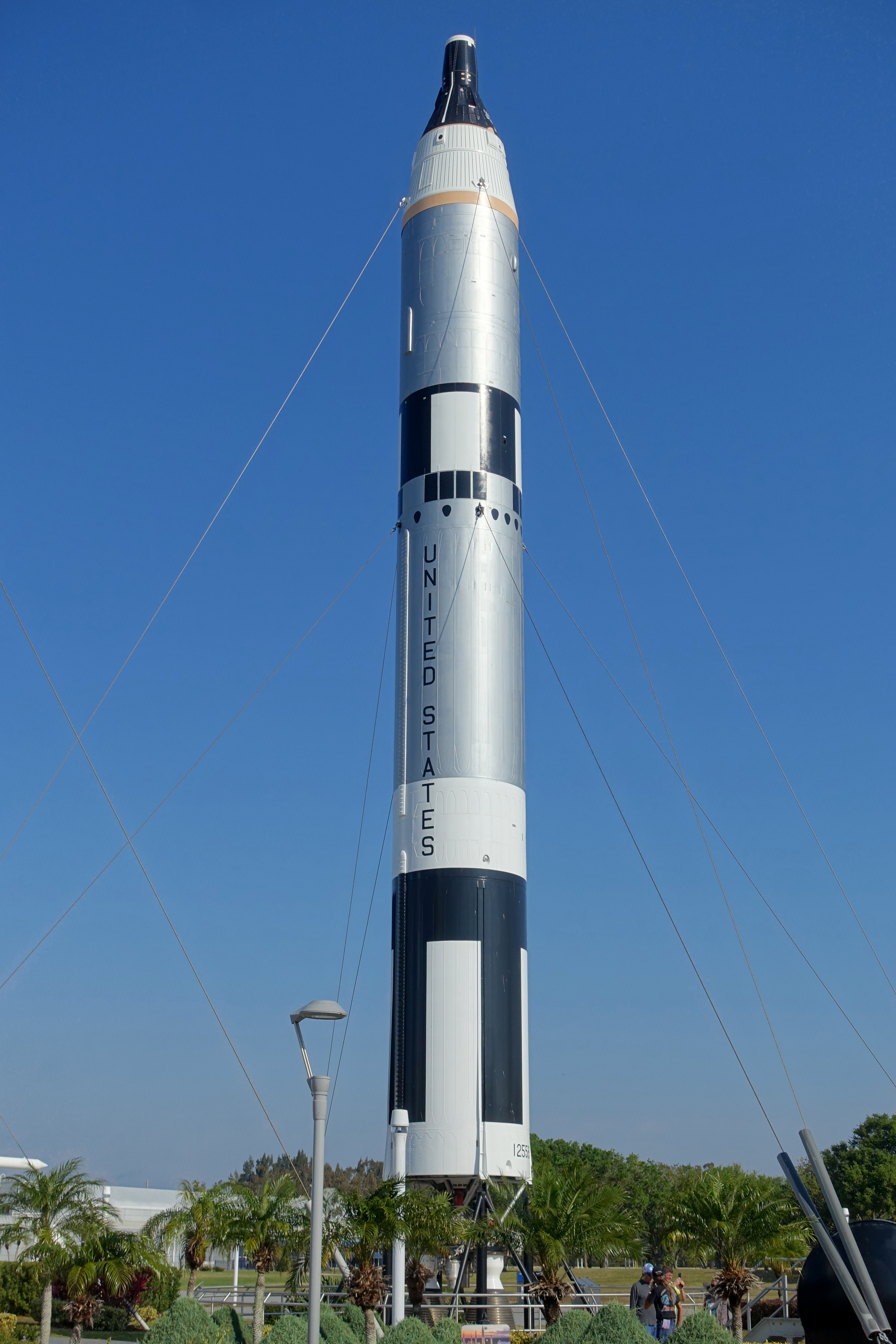
Titan II missile, repainted as GLV-3 12558 (Gemini 3), at KSC Rocket Garden.

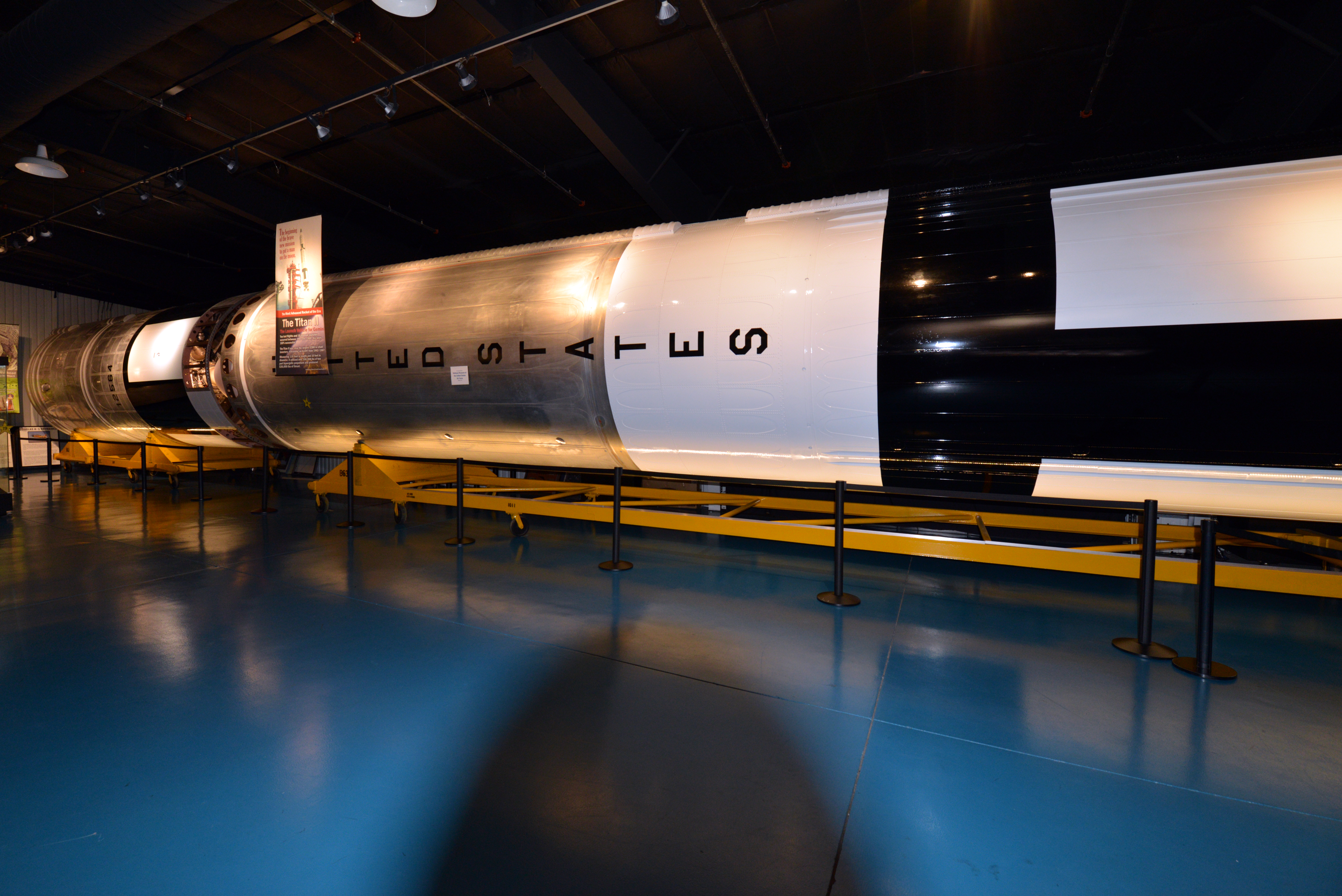
Titan II missile, repainted as GLV-9 12564 (Gemini 9A), at Stafford Air & Space Museum.

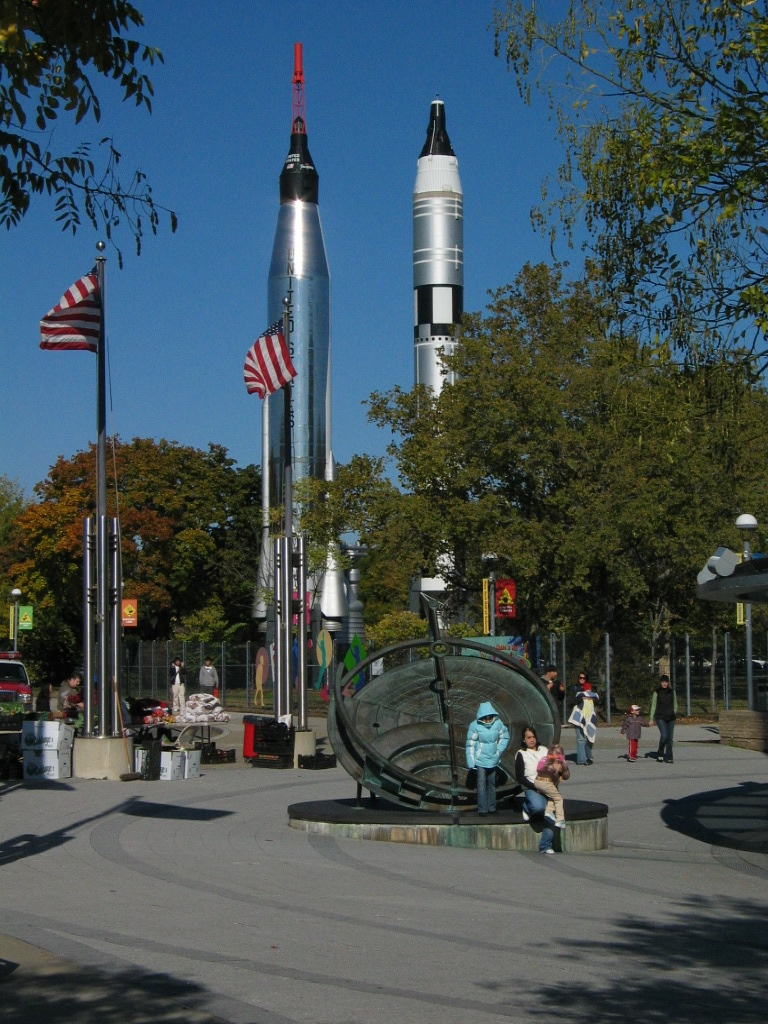
Gemini-Titan II replica (right) at the New York Hall of Science.

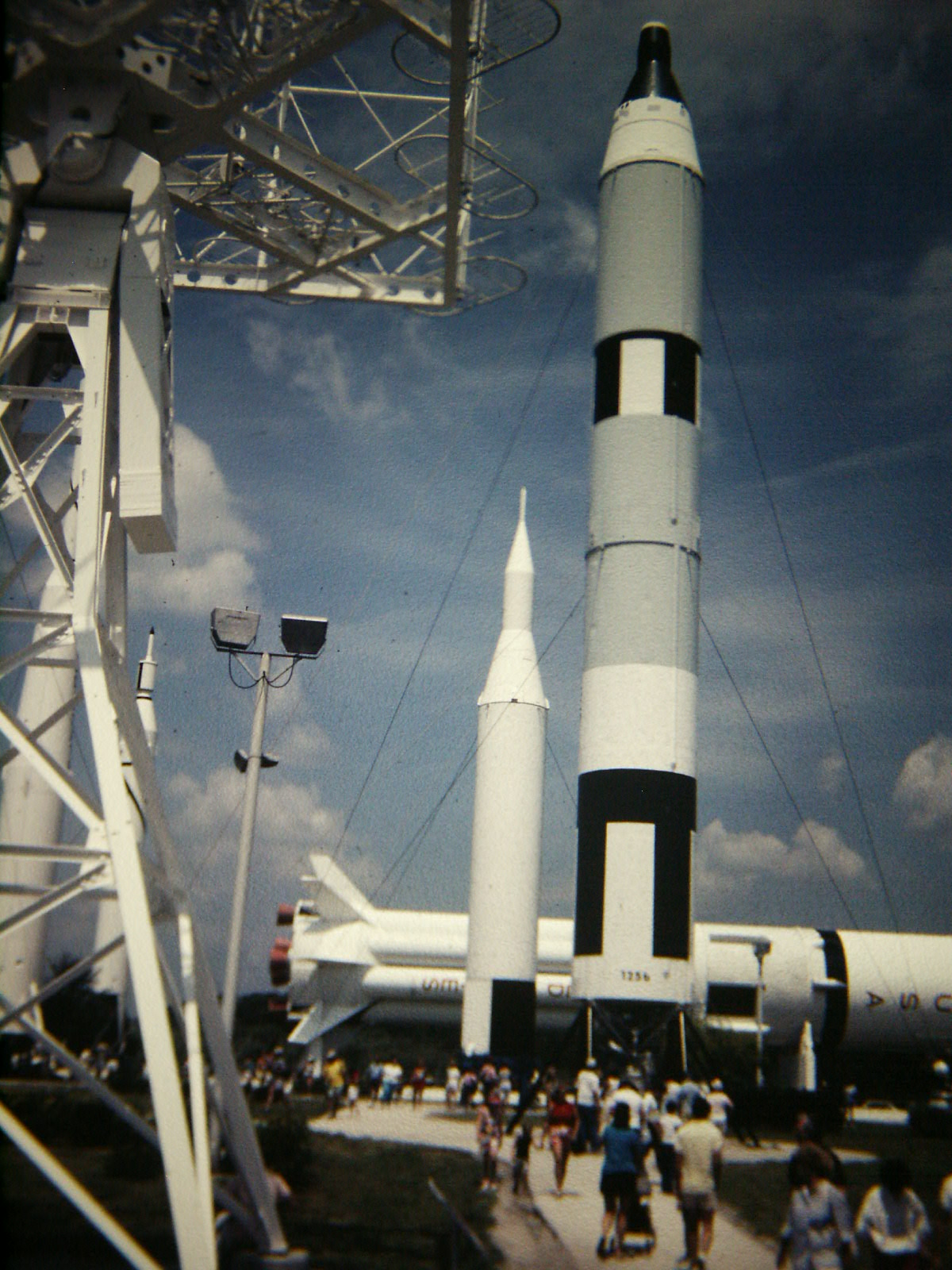
Gemini-Titan II mockup, created from two Titan I first stages, at KSC Rocket Garden.

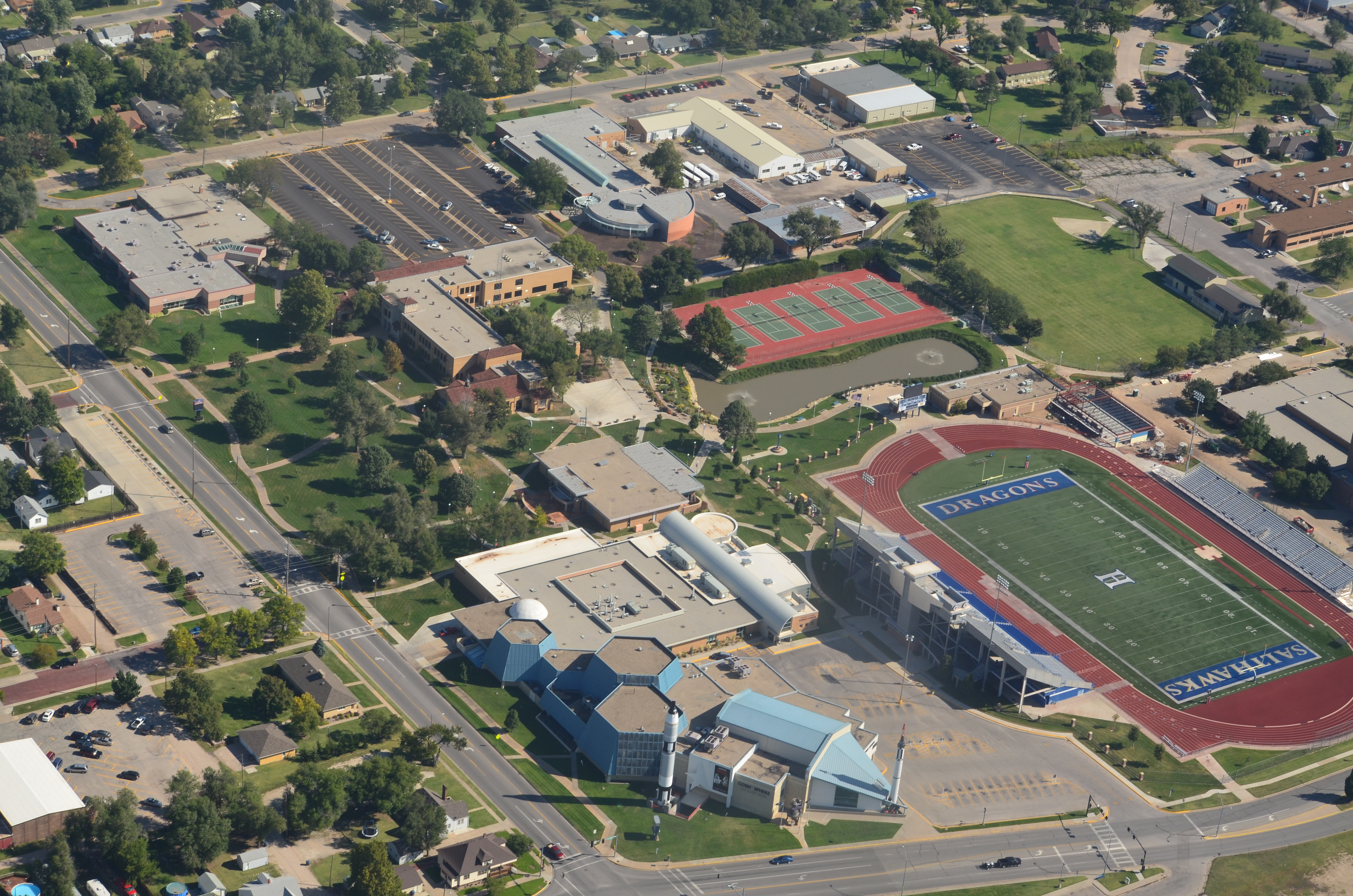
Gemini-Titan II replica (bottom) at the Kansas Cosmosphere and Space Center.

== See also ==
- SM-65D Atlas
- Soyuz (rocket)
- Voskhod (rocket)
