= Ljutic =

Ljutic may refer to:

- Al Ljutic (before 1930 - after 1964), American heavyweight boxer, competitive rifle shooter, and gun maker
  - Ljutic Industries, an American manufacturer of shotguns founded by Al Ljutic
  - Ljutic Space Gun, a 12 gauge single-shot shotgun designed by Al Ljutic
- Zrinka Ljutić (born 2004), Croatian alpine ski racer

== See also ==
- Ljutice (disambiguation)
