= Space Gun =

Space Gun may refer to:

- Space gun, a method of launching an object into space using a large gun- or cannon-like structure
- Space Gun (album), a 2018 album by Guided by Voices
- Space Gun (video game), a 1990 video game
- Ljutic Space Gun, a single-shot shotgun

== See also ==
- Hand-held maneuvering unit, also known as the maneuvering gun or zip gun, an astronaut propulsion unit
- Raygun, a science-fiction directed-energy weapon
- TP-82, a combination gun carried by cosmonauts on space missions
- Space weapon, a weapon used in space warfare
