= Ljutice =

Ljutice may refer to:

- Ljutice, Koceljeva, a village in the Koceljeva municipality of the Mačva District, Serbia
- Ljutice, Požega, a village in Požega, Serbia, Zlatibor District, Serbia

== See also ==
- Ljutic (disambiguation)
