= Gemini 10 =

1966 crewed spaceflight within NASA's Gemini program

Gemini X
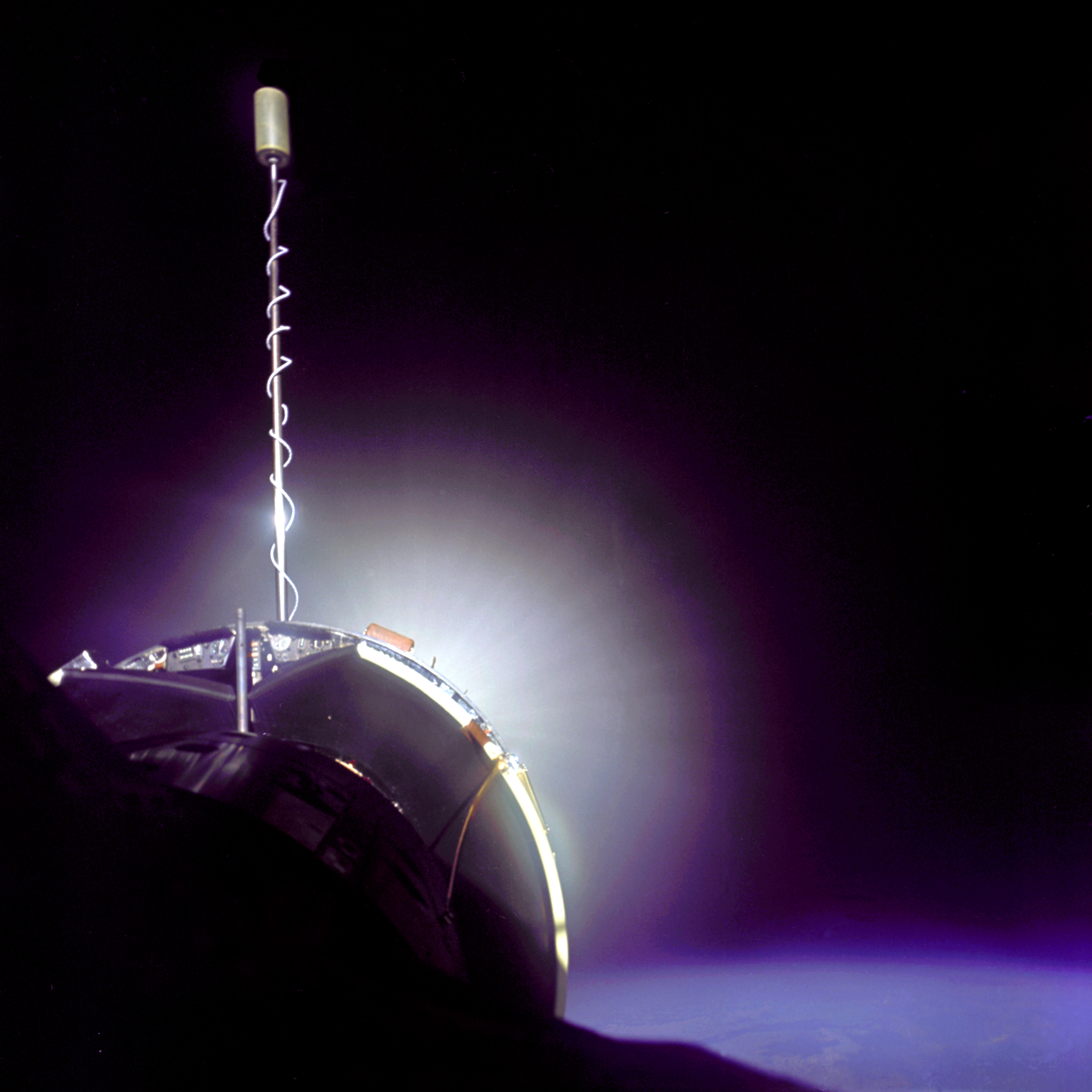
- Gemini 10 is boosted into a higher orbit by its Agena Target Vehicle
- Mission type: Space rendezvous; Spacecraft docking; Extravehicular activity
- Operator: NASA
- COSPAR ID: 1966-066A
- SATCAT no.: 2349
- Mission duration: 2 days, 22 hours, 46 minutes, 39 seconds
- Orbits completed: 43

Spacecraft properties
- Spacecraft: Gemini SC10
- Manufacturer: McDonnell
- Launch mass: 8,296 pounds (3,763 kg)
- Landing mass: 4,254 pounds (1,930 kg)

Crew
- Crew size: 2
- Members: John W. Young; Michael Collins
- EVAs: 2
- EVA duration: 1 hour, 28 minutes

Start of mission
- Launch date: July 18, 1966, 22:20:26 UTC
- Rocket: Titan II GLV, s/n #62-12565
- Launch site: Cape Kennedy LC-19

End of mission
- Recovered by: USS Guadalcanal
- Landing date: July 21, 1966, 21:07:05 UTC
- Landing site: 26°45′N 71°57′W

Orbital parameters
- Reference system: Geocentric
- Regime: Low Earth orbit
- Perigee altitude: 299 kilometers (161 nmi)
- Apogee altitude: 756 kilometers (408 nmi)
- Inclination: 28.8 degrees
- Period: 95.19 minutes
- Epoch: July 19, 1966

Docking with GATV-5005
- Docking date: July 19, 1966, 04:15:00 UTC
- Undocking date: July 20, 1966, 19:00:00 UTC
- Time docked: 1 day, 14 hours, 45 minutes
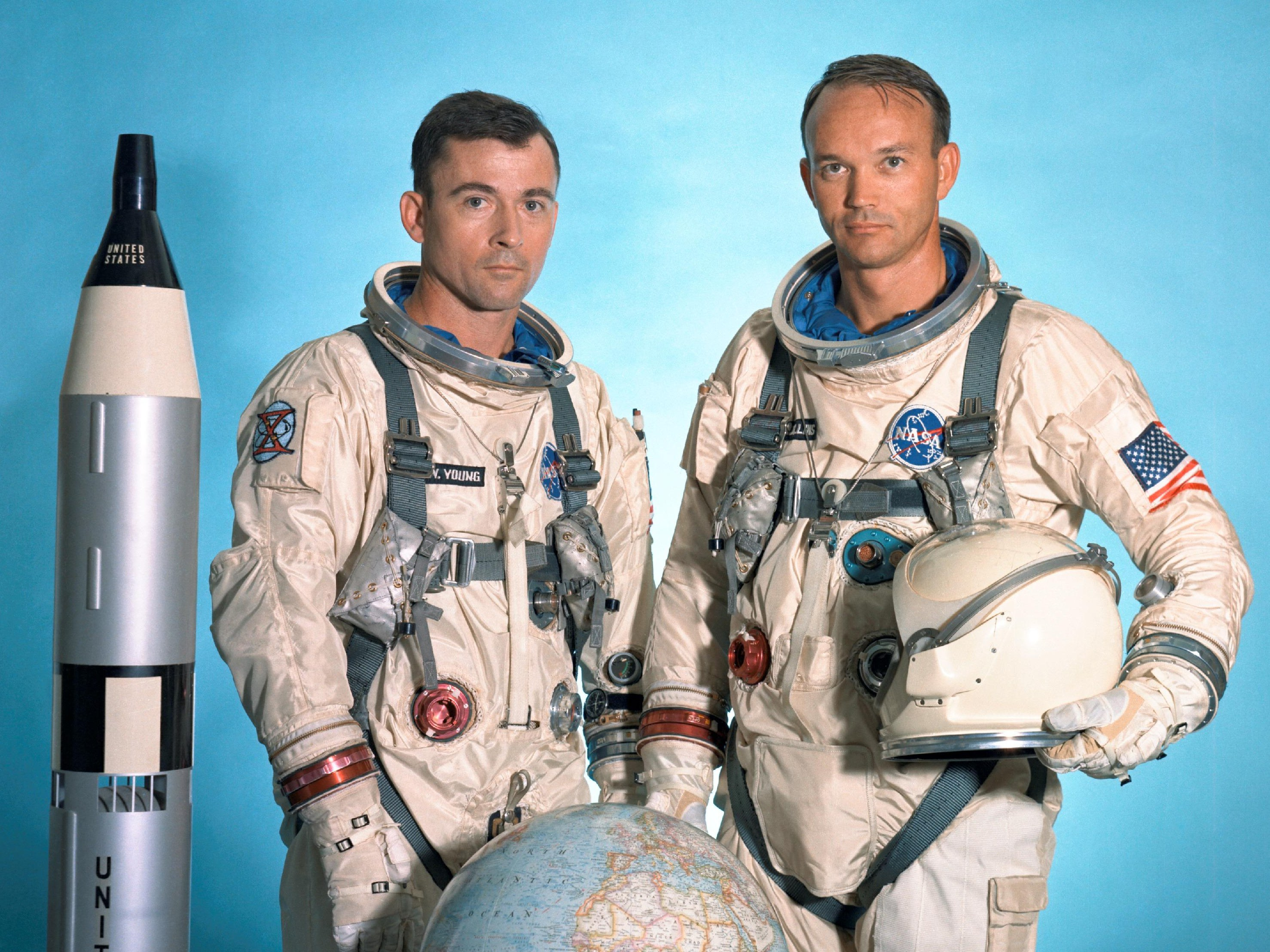
- (L-R) Young, Collins Project Gemini

Gemini 10 (officially Gemini X) was a 1966 crewed spaceflight in NASA's Gemini program. It was the 8th crewed Gemini flight, the 16th crewed American flight, and the 24th spaceflight of all time (includes X-15 flights over 100 kilometers (62 miles; 54 nautical miles)). During the mission, flown by command pilot John Young and pilot Michael Collins, Collins became the first person to perform two extravehicular activities.

== Crew ==
| Position | Astronaut |
|---|---|
| Command Pilot | John W. Young; Second spaceflight |
| Pilot | Michael Collins; First spaceflight |

=== Backup crew ===
| Position | Astronaut |
|---|---|
| Command Pilot | Alan L. Bean |
| Pilot | Clifton C. Williams Jr. |

=== Support crew ===
- Edwin E. "Buzz" Aldrin (Houston CAPCOM)
- L. Gordon Cooper Jr. (Cape and Houston CAPCOM)

Jim Lovell and Buzz Aldrin had originally been named the backup crew, but after Charles Bassett and Elliot See died in a T-38 crash, they were moved to the backup crew for Gemini 9A and Alan Bean and Clifton Williams were moved to the Gemini 10 flight.

== Mission parameters ==
- Mass: 8,295 pounds (3,762.6 kg)
- Perigee: 86.3 nautical miles (159.9 km)
- Apogee: 145.2 nautical miles (268.9 km)
- Inclination: 28.87°
- Period: 88.79 min

=== Docking ===
- Docked: July 19, 1966 - 04:15:00 UTC
- Undocked: July 20, 1966 - 19:00:00 UTC

=== Space walk ===
- Collins - EVA 1 (stand up)
  - Start: July 19, 1966, 21:44:00 UTC
  - End: July 19, 1966, 22:33:00 UTC
  - Duration: 0 hours, 49 minutes
- Collins - EVA 2
  - Start: July 20, 1966, 23:01:00 UTC
  - End: July 20, 1966, 23:40:00 UTC
  - Duration: 0 hours, 39 minutes

== Objectives ==
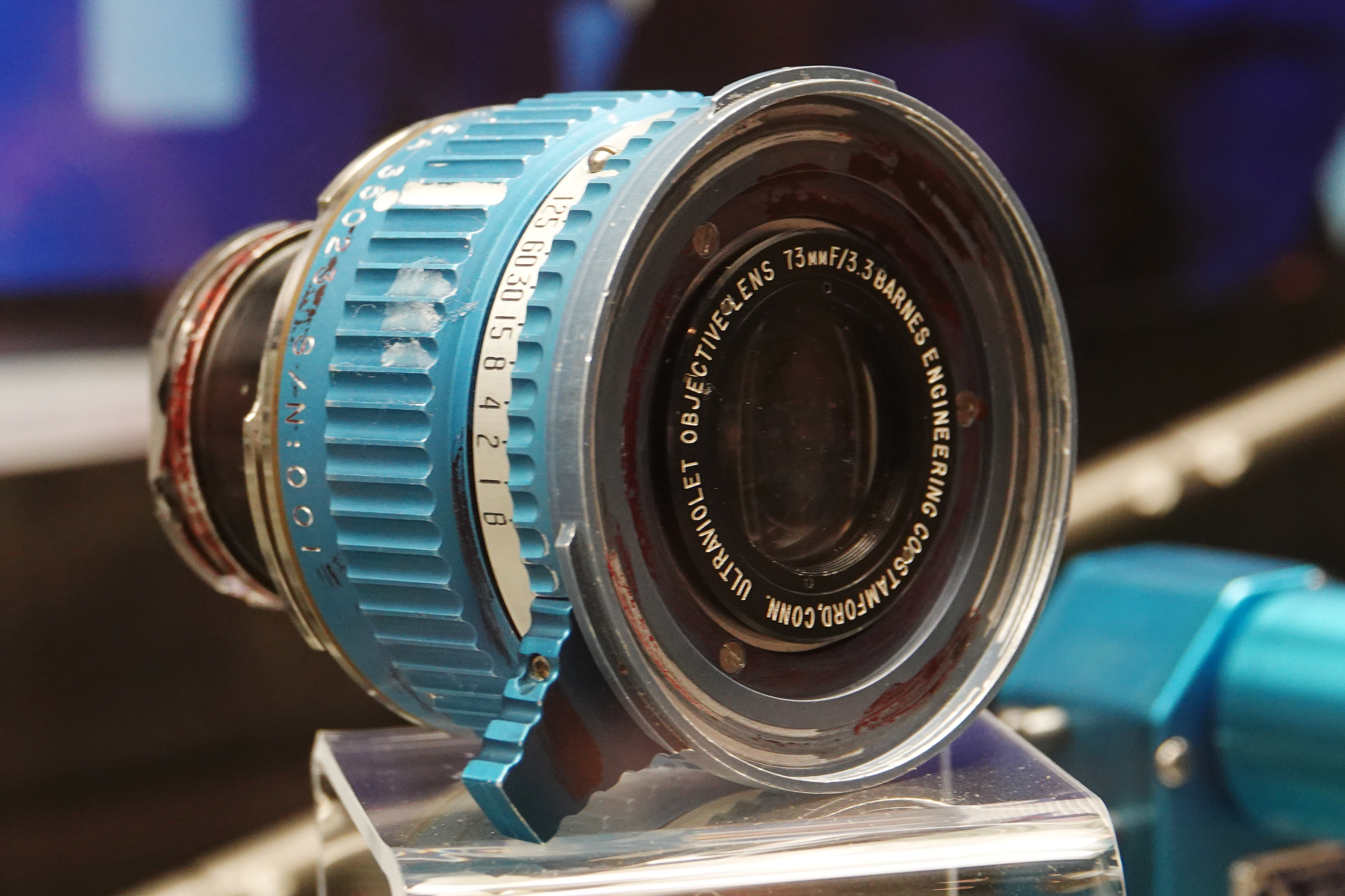
Gemini X Ultraviolet Lens

Gemini 10 was designed to achieve rendezvous and docking with an Agena Target Vehicle (ATV), and EVA. It was also planned to rendezvous with the ATV from the Gemini 8 mission. This Agena's battery power had failed months earlier, and an approach would demonstrate the ability to rendezvous with a passive object. It would also be the first mission to fire the Agena's own rocket, allowing them to reach higher orbits.

Gemini 10 established that radiation at high altitude was not a problem. After docking with their Agena booster in low orbit, Young and Collins used it to climb temporarily to 412.4 nautical miles (763.8 km). After leaving the first Agena, they then rendezvoused with the derelict Agena left over from the aborted Gemini 8 flight—thus executing the program's first double rendezvous. With no electricity on board the second Agena, the rendezvous was accomplished with eyes only—no radar.

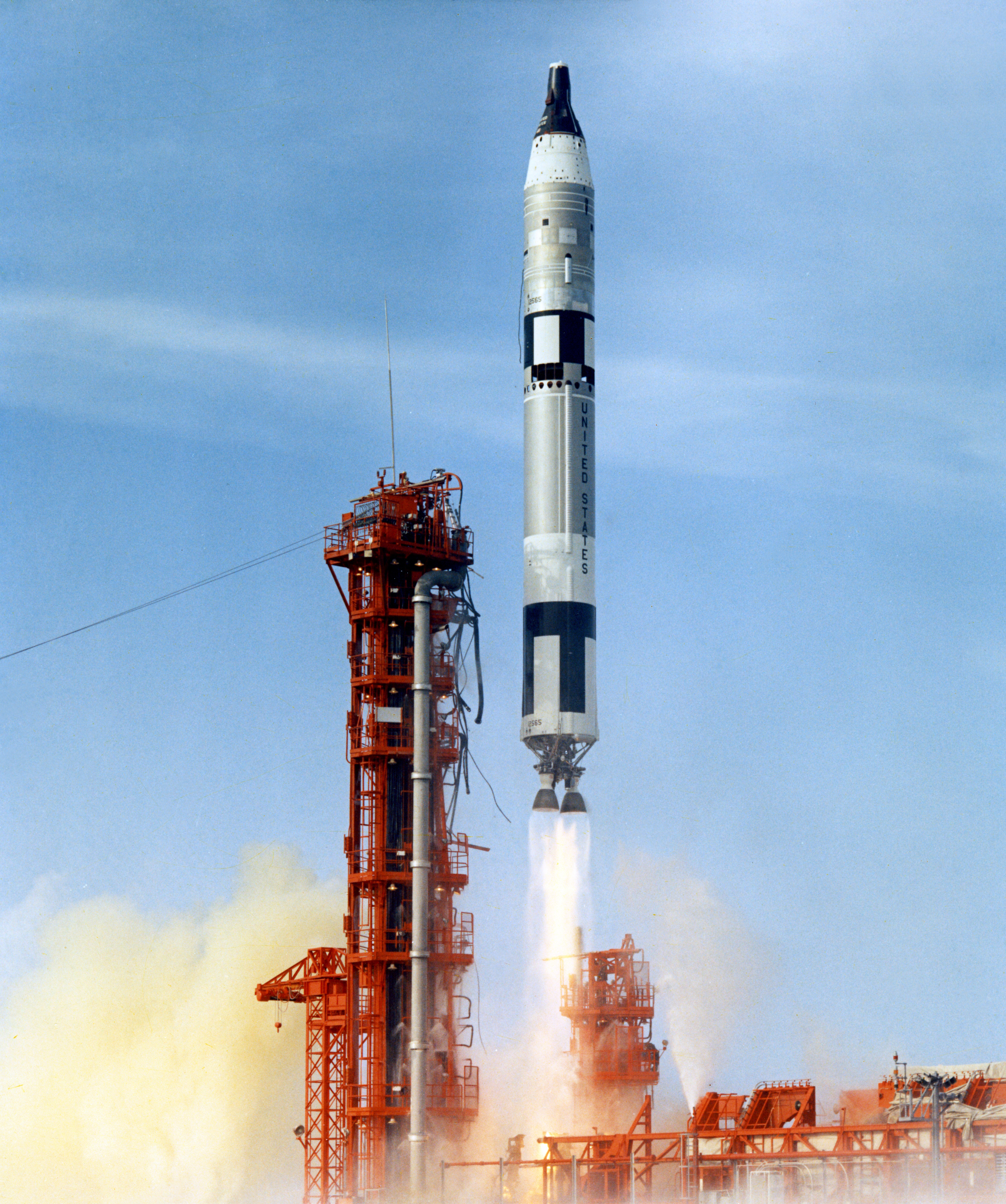
Launch of Gemini 10 mission

After the rendezvous, Collins spacewalked over to the dormant Agena at the end of a 50-foot (15 m) tether, making him the first person to meet another spacecraft in orbit. Collins then retrieved a cosmic dust-collecting panel from the side of the Agena. As he was concentrating on keeping his tether clear of the Gemini and Agena, Collins' Hasselblad camera worked itself free and drifted away, so he was unable to take photographs during the spacewalk.

== Flight ==
The Agena launched perfectly for the second time, after problems had occurred with the targets for Gemini 6 and 9. Gemini 10 followed 100 minutes later and entered a 86.3-by-145.2-nautical-mile (159.9 by 268.9 km) orbit. They were 970 nautical miles (1,800 km) behind the Agena. Two anomalous events occurred during the launch. At liftoff, a propellant fill umbilical became snared with its release lanyard. It ripped out of the LC-19 service tower and remained attached to the second stage during ascent. Tracking camera footage also showed that the first stage oxidizer tank dome ruptured after staging and released a cloud of nitrogen tetroxide. The telemetry package on the first stage had been disabled at staging, so visual evidence was the only data available. Film review of the Titan II ICBM launches found at least seven other instances of post-staging tank ruptures, most likely caused by flying debris, second stage engine exhaust, or structural bending. NASA finally decided that this phenomenon did not pose any safety risk to the astronauts and took no corrective action.

| Gemini 10 | Agena Info |
|---|---|
| Agena | GATV-5005 |
| NSSDC ID: | 1966-065A |
| Mass | 7,000 pounds (3,175 kg) |
| Launch site | LC-14 |
| Launch date | July 18, 1966 |
| Launch time | 20:39:46 UTC |
| 1st perigee | 159.1 nautical miles (294.7 km) |
| 1st apogee | 163.5 nautical miles (302.8 km) |
| Period | 90.46 m |
| Inclination | 28.85 |
| Reentered | December 29, 1966 |

=== First rendezvous ===
Collins was unable to use the sextant for navigation as it did not seem to work as expected. At first he mistook airglow as the real horizon when trying to make some fixes on stars. When the image didn't seem right he tried another instrument, but this was not practical to use as it had a very small field of view.

They had a backup in the form of the computers on the ground. They made their first burn to put them into a 143-by-147-nautical-mile (265 by 272 km) orbit. However Young didn't realize that during the next burn, he had the spacecraft turned slightly, which meant that they introduced an out-of-plane error. This meant two extra burns were necessary, and by the time they had docked with the Agena, 60% of their fuel had been consumed. It was decided to keep the Gemini docked to the Agena as long as possible, as this would mean that they could use the fuel on board the Agena for attitude control.

The first burn of the Agena engine lasted 80 seconds and put them in a 159-by-412-nautical-mile (294 by 763 km) orbit. This was the highest a person had ever been, although the record was soon surpassed by Gemini 11, which went to over 540 nautical miles (1,000 km). This burn was quite a ride for the crew. Because the Gemini and Agena docked nose-to-nose, the forces experienced were "eyeballs out" as opposed to "eyeballs in" for a launch from Earth. The crew took a couple of pictures when they reached apogee but were more interested in what was going on in the spacecraft — checking the systems and watching the radiation dosage meter.

After this they had their sleep period which lasted for eight hours and then they were ready for another busy day. The crew's first order of business was to make a second burn with the Agena engine to put them into the same orbit as the Gemini 8 Agena. This was at 20:58 UTC on July 19 and lasted 78 seconds and took 340 feet per second (105 m/s) off their speed, putting them into a 159-by-206-nautical-mile (294 by 382 km) orbit. They made one more burn of the Agena to circularize their orbit to 203.9 nautical miles (377.6 km).

=== EVA 1 ===
The first of two EVAs on Gemini 10 was a standup EVA, where Collins would stand in the open hatch and take photographs of stars as part of experiment S-13. They used a 70 mm general purpose camera to image the southern Milky Way in ultraviolet. After orbital sunrise Collins photographed a color plate on the side of the spacecraft (MSC-8) to see whether film reproduced colors accurately in space. He reentered the spacecraft six minutes early when both astronauts found that their eyes were irritated, which was caused by a minor leak of lithium hydroxide in the astronauts' oxygen supply. After repressurizing the cabin, they ran the oxygen at high rates and flushed the environment system.

After the exercise of the EVA Young and Collins slept in their second 'night' in space. The next 'morning' they started preparing for the second rendezvous and another EVA.

=== Second rendezvous ===
After undocking from their Agena, the crew thought they sighted the Gemini 8 Agena. It however turned out to be their own Agena 3.0 nautical miles (5.5 km) away, while their target was 95 nautical miles (176 km) away. It was not until just over 16 nautical miles (30 km) away that they saw it as a faint star. After a few more correction burns, they were station-keeping 10 feet (3.0 m) away from the Gemini 8 Agena. They found the Agena to be very stable and in good condition.

=== EVA 2 ===
At 48 hours and 41 minutes into the mission, the second EVA began. Collins' first task was to retrieve a Micrometeorite Collector (S-12) from the side of the spacecraft. This he accomplished with some difficulty (similar to that encountered by Eugene Cernan on Gemini 9A). The collector floated out of the cabin at some time during the EVA, and was lost.

Collins next traveled over to the Agena and tried to grab onto the docking cone but found this impossible as it was smooth and had no grip. He used a nitrogen-propelled Hand-Held Maneuvering Unit (HHMU) to move himself towards the Gemini and then back to the Agena. This time he was able to grab hold of some wire bundles and retrieved the Micrometeorite Collector (S-10) from the Agena. He decided against replacing it as a piece of shroud had come loose on the Agena which could have snared the umbilical, and returning to the Gemini was deemed the safest course of action.

The last tasks remaining on this EVA were to test out the HHMU, test orbital mechanics using a tether between the Gemini and Agena, and for Young in the spacecraft to translate over to a passive Collins. However, due to low propellant quantity remaining, combined with intermittent telemetry to monitor it, these fuel costly manoeuvres were abandoned and the EVA was finished after only 39 minutes. During this time, it took the crew eight minutes to close the hatch as they had some difficulty with the 50-foot (15 m) umbilical. It was jettisoned along with the chestpack used by Collins an hour later when they opened the hatch for the third and final time.

=== Experiments ===
There were ten other experiments that the crew performed during the mission. Three were interested in radiation: MSC-3 was the Tri-Axis Magnetometer which measured levels in the South Atlantic Anomaly. There was also MSC-6, a beta spectrometer, which measured potential radiation doses for Apollo missions, and MSC-7, a bremsstrahlung spectrometer which detected radiation flux as a function of energy when the spacecraft passed through the South Atlantic Anomaly.

S-26 investigated the ion and electron wake of the spacecraft. This provided limited results due to the lack of fuel for attitude control, but found that electron and ion temperatures were higher than expected and it registered shock effects during docking and undocking.

The S-5 and S-6 experiments were performed, which were previously carried on Gemini 9A; these were Synoptic Terrain and Synoptic Weather photography respectively. There was also S-1 which was intended to image the Zodiacal light. All of these experiments were of little use as the film used was only half as sensitive as Gemini 9A and the dirty windows lowered the transmission of light by a factor of six.

The crew also tried to perform D-5, a navigation experiment. They were only able to track five stars, with six needed for accurate measurements. The last experiment, D-10, was to investigate an ion-sensing attitude control system. This experiment measured the attitude of the spacecraft from the flow of ions and electrons around the spacecraft in orbit. The results from this experiment showed the system to be accurate and responsive.

=== Re-entry ===
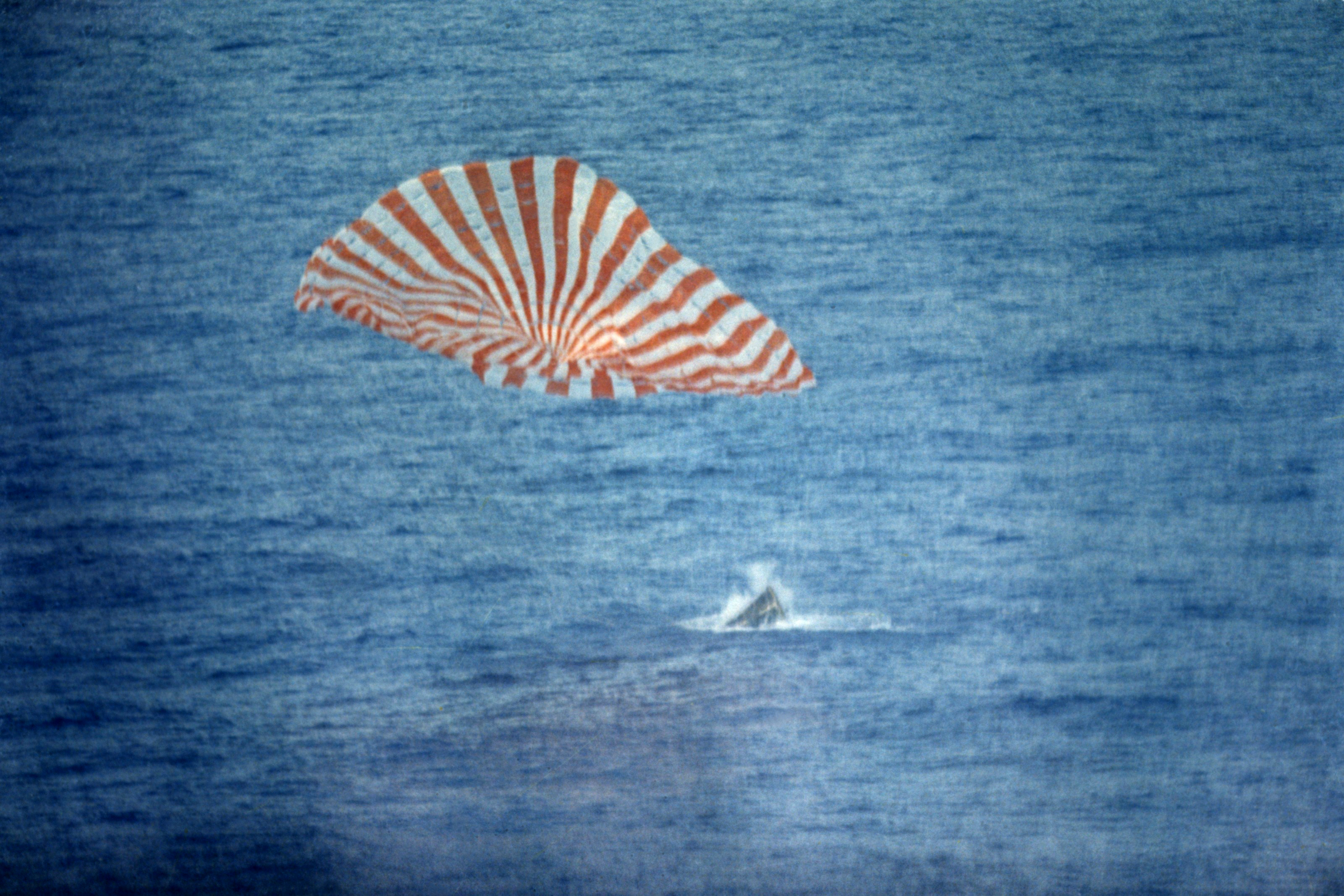
Splashdown of Gemini 10.

The last day of the mission was short and retrofire came at 70 hours and 10 minutes into the mission. They landed only 3.0 nautical miles (5.6 km) away from the intended landing site and were recovered by USS Guadalcanal.

The Gemini 10 mission was supported by the following U.S. Department of Defense resources: 9,067 personnel, 78 aircraft and 13 ships.

== Insignia ==
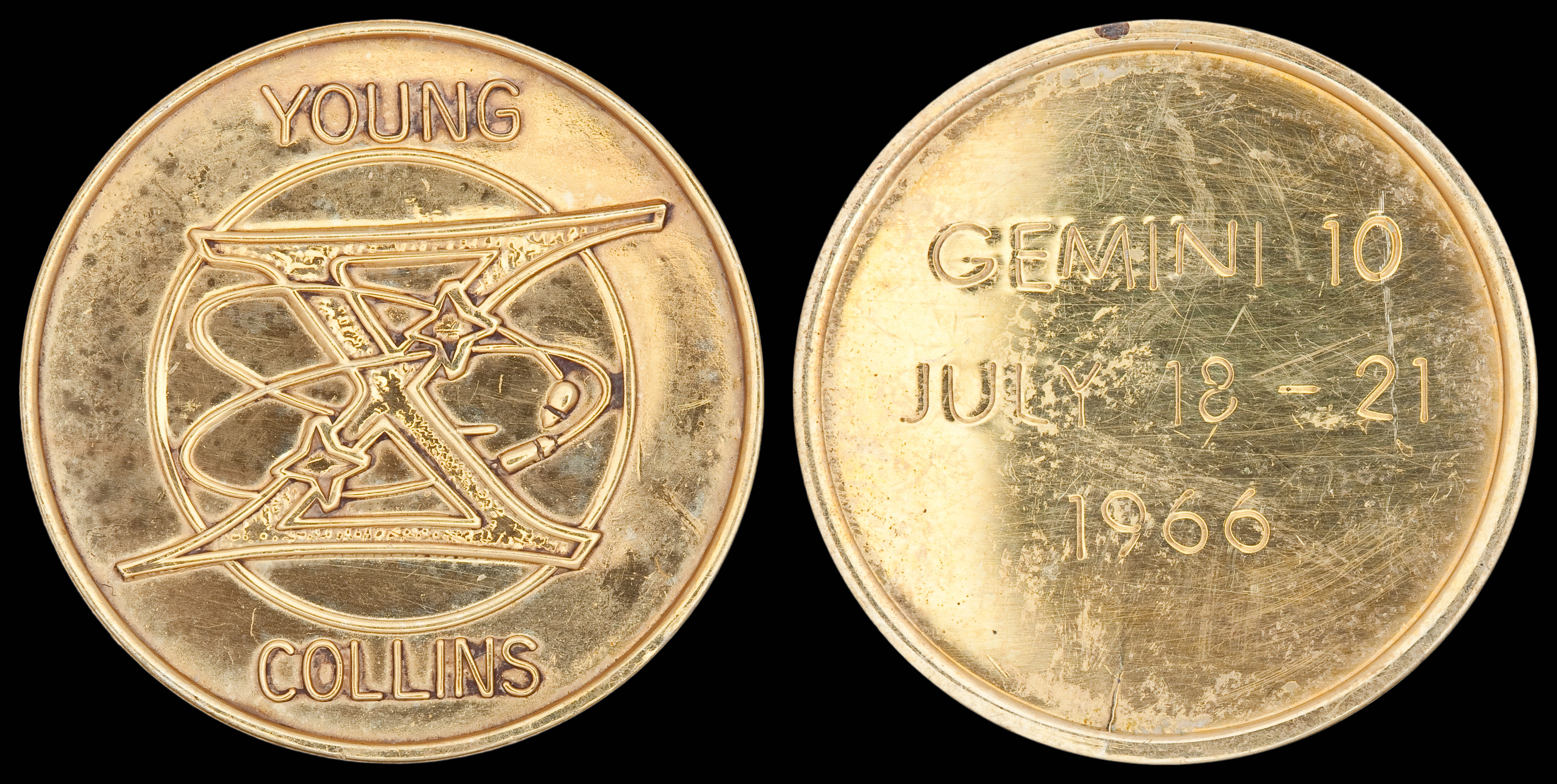
Gemini 10 space-flown Fliteline Medallion

The patch is simple in design but highly symbolic. The main feature is a large X with a Gemini and Agena orbiting around it. The two stars have a variety of meanings: the two rendezvous attempts, Castor and Pollux in Gemini or the two crew members. This is one of the few crew patches without the crew's name. It is able to be displayed "upside down" but is correctly shown with the spacecraft to the right. It was designed by Young's first wife, Barbara.

== Spacecraft location ==
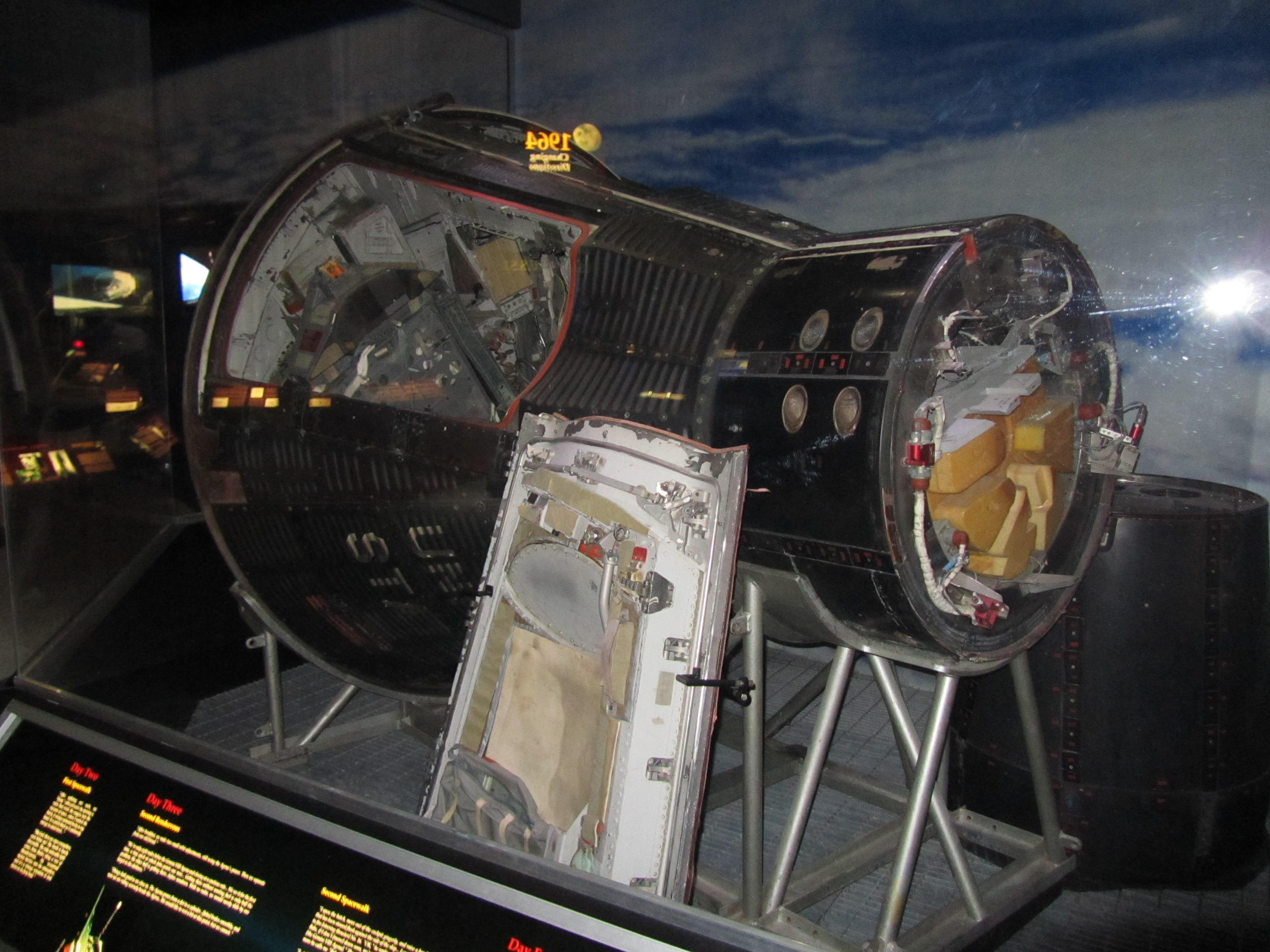
The Gemini 10 space capsule on display at the Cosmosphere in Kansas

For many years the spacecraft was the centerpiece of a space exhibition at Norsk Teknisk Museum, Oslo, Norway. It was returned on request in 2002.

The spacecraft is currently on display at the Cosmosphere in Hutchinson, Kansas.

== See also ==
- Agena target vehicle
- Extravehicular activity
- List of spacewalks and moonwalks
- Splashdown
- Space exploration
- U.S. space exploration history on U.S. stamps
- Space suit
- Space capsule

| Preceded by Voskhod 2 crew | Human altitude record July 1966-Sept 1966 | Succeeded by Gemini 11 crew |
