= Hand-held maneuvering unit =

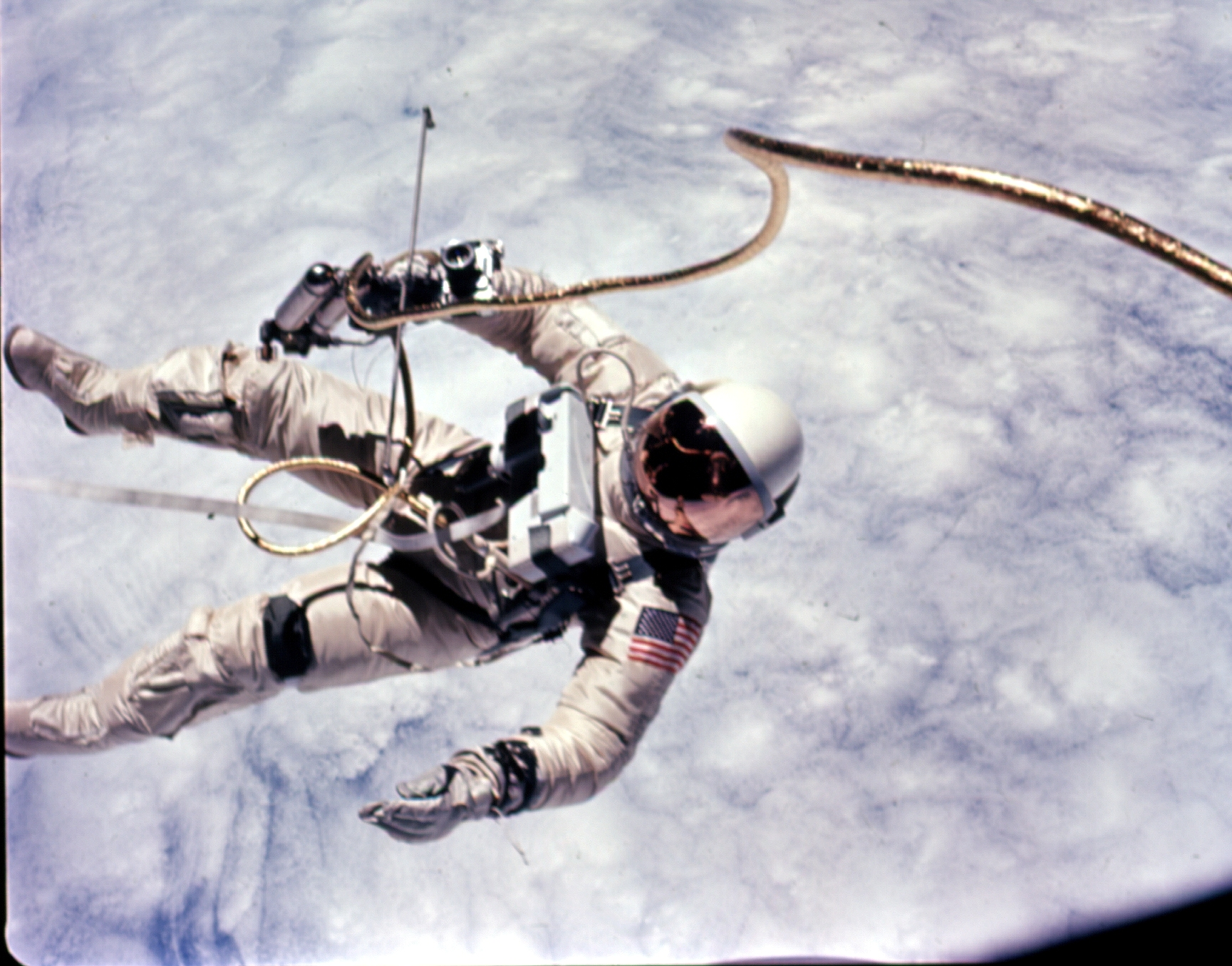
Astronaut Ed White uses the first Hand-Held Maneuvering Unit during his spacewalk on Gemini 4

The Hand-Held Maneuvering Unit (HHMU), also known as the maneuvering gun, or informally as "the zip gun", was the first astronaut propulsion unit. It was first used by astronaut Ed White during the first American "spacewalk" (extra-vehicular activity, EVA), on Gemini 4, June 3, 1965. Different models of HHMU were present on Gemini 4, 8, 10, and 11, but were only used on Gemini 4 and 10. It was also used aboard Skylab. Some propellants used include oxygen, freon, and nitrogen, which are pressurized but not ignited.

== Utility and design ==
Astronauts described the gun as easier to use than other methods of maneuvering during space-walking. It provided an impulse to send the space-walker away from and back to the spacecraft, and was the easiest way for them to control their motions in the microgravity environment. The device received its propellant from tanks on the device and used pressurized oxygen to control and propel the astronaut via conservation of momentum.

== History ==
=== Gemini 4 ===
Ed White enjoyed using the gun and found it useful, but quickly ran out of propellant, forcing him to pull on his tether to continue maneuvers. However, fellow crewman James McDivitt recalled the gun as being "hopeless" and "utterly useless" as it required precise aim through the user's center of mass in order to translate in a straight line without inducing unwanted rotation.

=== Gemini 8 ===
The device carried on Gemini 8 (March 16–17, 1966) received its Freon 14 propellant from a tank to be carried on the astronaut's back. Astronaut David Scott never got a chance to use it, because the mission had to be terminated before his EVA due to a critical thruster problem.

=== Gemini 10 ===
The Gemini 10 device used by Michael Collins received its nitrogen gas propellant from inside the spacecraft, through a hose bundled with the astronaut's umbilical connector. Collins successfully used it to move back and forth between the Gemini and the Agena Target Vehicle.

=== Gemini 11 ===
Richard Gordon did not get to use his HHMU on Gemini 11, because his EVA had to be cut short when he became fatigued.

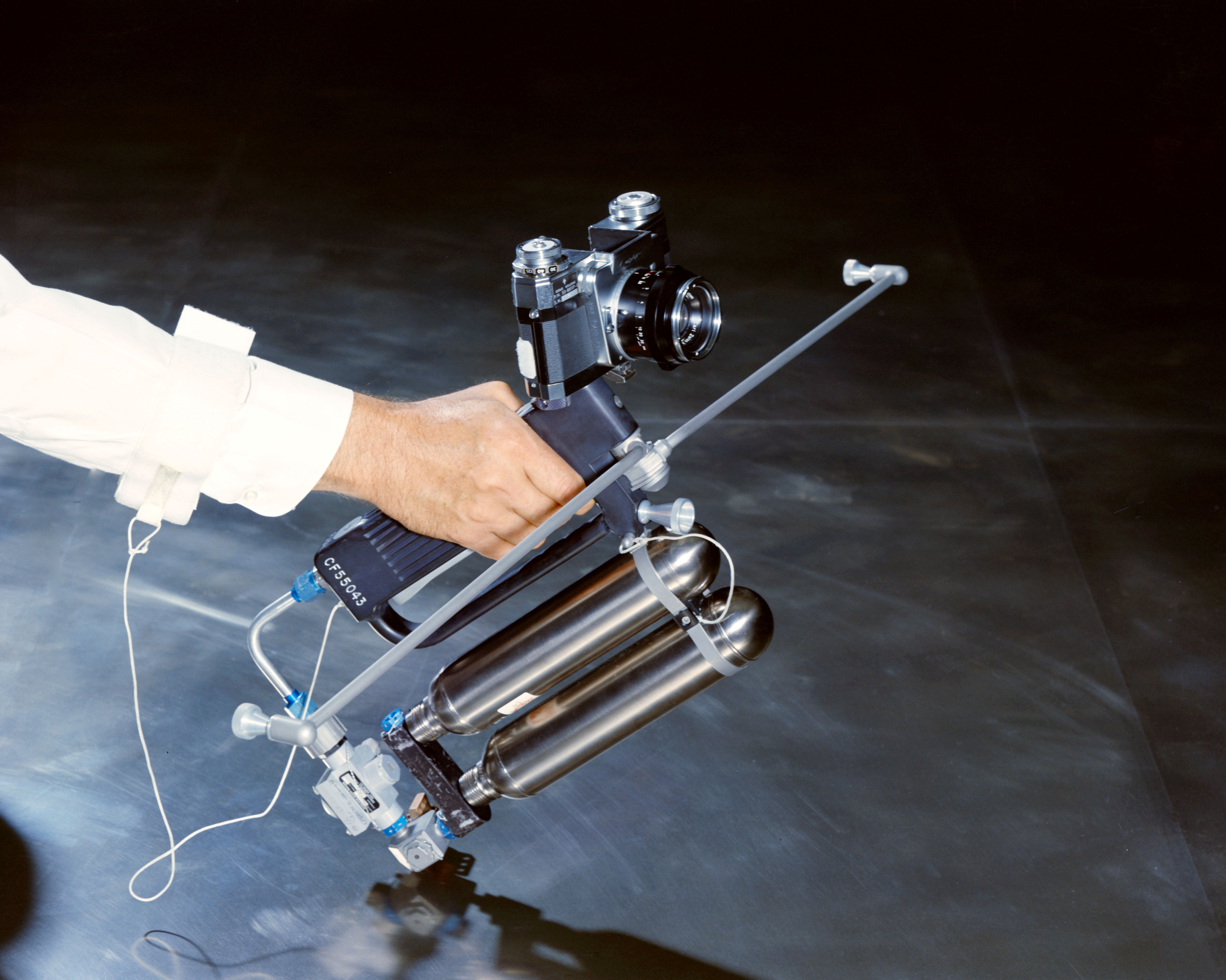
Gemini 4 HHMU

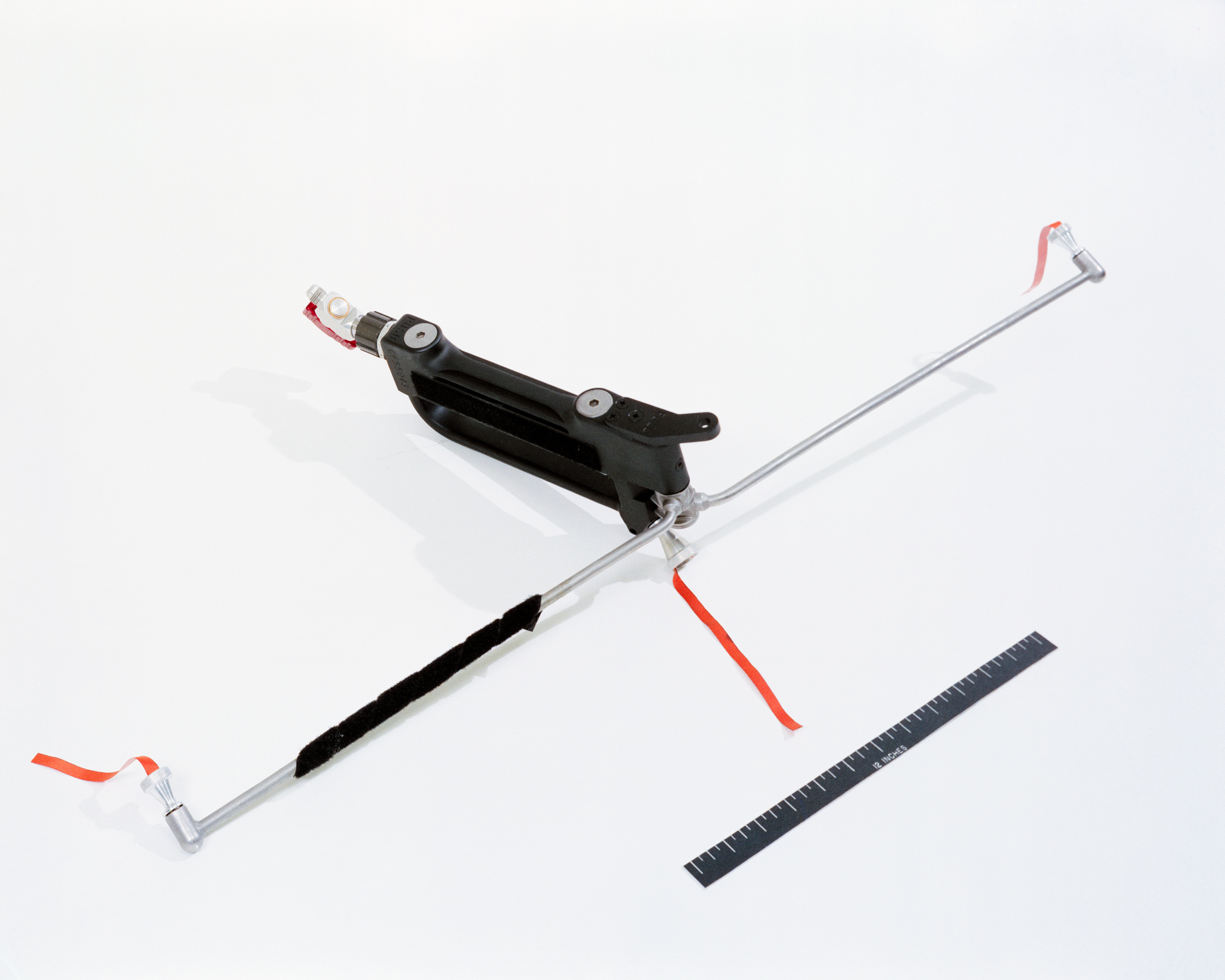
Gemini 8 HHMU
