= Ljutic Industries =

Ljutic Industries, LLC
- Company type: LLC
- Industry: Arms Industry
- Founded: 1959
- Headquarters: Yakima, Washington, United States
- Products: Firearms
- Number of employees: 12
- Website: www.ljuticgun.com

Ljutic Industries (formerly known as the Ljutic Gun Company) is an American manufacturer of shotguns in the United States, based in Yakima, Washington. It was founded by Al Ljutic and his wife Nadine in Reno, Nevada in 1959.

== History ==
With his father, Al Ljutic ran the Ljutic Gun Company in the vicinity of Fresno. In 1955, AA Reil, a friend and Remington field rep, invited Al to go trap shooting the day after. Al realized after that he didn't own a trap gun. Instead of buying one, Al designed and built one by the end of the day. This became the template for the Ljutic Space Gun.

Ljutic Industries was founded in 1959 using a $500,000 settlement from Winchester Repeating Arms Company following Winchester's use of a Ljutic design.

In 1960, the company changed its name from the "Ljutic Gun Company" to the current "Ljutic Industries."

In 1964, a fire in the Ljutic home/plant resulted in the company's relocation to Yakima. This led to a friendship with former Green Bay Packers end Dan Orlich who started trap shooting with Ljutic shotguns. This naturally resulted in increased interest in Ljutic shotguns.

== Acquisition ==
With 12-employees, Ljutic Industries production peaked at 340 shotguns a year in the early 1980s. In the 1990s, it quickly lost out to rivals such as Perazzi, Krieghoff, and Kolar Arms, shipping only 50 shotguns in 2007. By 2006, the company owed $1 million in taxes to the IRS, had discontented customers, and was close to shutting down. This led to its purchase from the IRS in September of that year by Jere Irwin of Irwin Research and Development for $250,000 and a small sum to the Ljutic family for company naming rights.

== Ljutic Firearms ==
- Adjustable Mono gun
- Mono gun
- Pro 3
- Ljutic Space Gun
