= Al Ljutic =

Albert V. Ljutic
- Spouse: Nadine Ljutic
- Children: Joe Ljutic, Loretta Lafrazia, James "Jimmy" Ljutic
- Engineering career
- Projects: Ljutic Industries

Albert V. Ljutic was an American professional heavy-weight boxer, competitive rifle shooter, machinist and gun maker known for founding Ljutic Industries. and the creation of the Ljutic Space Gun.

== Early years ==
Al Ljutic was a Californian of Croatian descent. A professional boxer in the 1930s he lived in Oakland, California where he and his father started manufacturing rifles.

In 1955, Ljutic was invited to go trap shooting by his friend and Remington field representative AA Reil. After accepting Ljutic realized he didn't have a trap gun. Rather than purchasing one or going back on a promise he designed and built his own in a day. This served as the basis for the Ljutic Space Gun.
