= Ljutic Space Gun =

- Type: Trap Gun
- Place of origin: United States

Production history
- Designer: Al Ljutic
- Designed: 1955
- Manufacturer: Ljutic Industries
- No. built: < 20,000
- Variants: .22-250, .30/30 Win, 308 Win, 30.06

Specifications
- Barrel length: 30 inches
- Cartridge: 12 Gauge
- Action: Bolt-action

The Ljutic Space Gun is a 12 gauge single-shot shotgun intended for trap shooting. Originally designed in 1955, the firearm has since been discontinued.

== History ==
With his father, Al Ljutic ran the Ljutic Gun Company (Now Ljutic Industries) in the vicinity of Fresno, California. In 1955, AA Reil, a friend and Remington field rep, invited Al to go trap shooting the day after. Al realized after that he didn't own a trap gun. Instead of buying one, Al designed and built one by the end of the day. This became the template for the Ljutic Space Gun.

Only about 200 of the shotgun variant were made, making the firearm run anywhere from $2,500 to $3,000 on the secondary market (2013). However the weapon was also offered in single-shot rifle variants, using a 24-inch barrel, which began being produced in 1981. These were chambered in .22-250, .30/30 Win, .308 Win, and 30.06 calibers. With less than 20,000 total shotgun and rifle variants being made.

== Variants ==
- 12 Gauge
- .22-250
- .30-30
- .308
- .30-06
