= GATV =

GATV may refer to Grand Theft Auto 5

- Gemini-Agena Target Vehicle
- Government-access television; Public, educational, and government access (PEG Channels); Cable television in the United States
