= RM-81 Agena =

American rocket upper stage and satellite bus

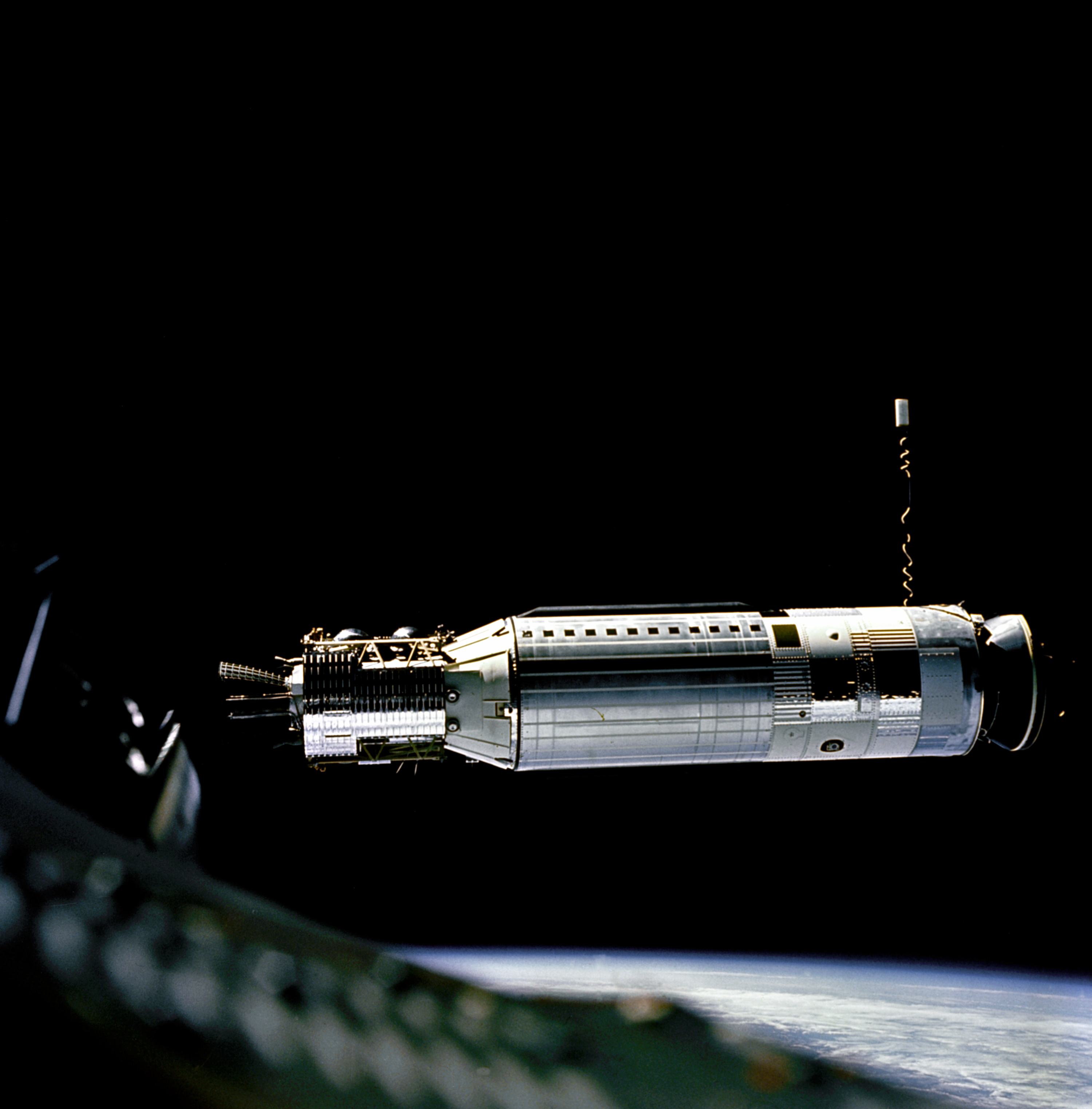
- Agena-D outfitted as a Gemini program Target Vehicle
- Manufacturer: Lockheed Corporation
- Country of origin: United States
- Used on: Atlas-Agena; Thor-Agena; Thorad-Agena; Titan IIIB

General characteristics
- Height: 248 inches (6.3 m)
- Diameter: 60 inches (1.5 m)

Launch history
- Status: retired
- Total launches: 365
- First flight: 1959
- Last flight: February 12, 1987

RM-81 Agena
- Powered by: One Bell XLR-81
- Maximum thrust: 16,000 pounds-force (71 kN)
- Specific impulse: 293 seconds (2.87 km/s) (vac)
- Burn time: 120–265 s
- Propellant: UDMH/Red fuming nitric acid

The RM-81 Agena (/ədʒinə/) was an American rocket upper stage and satellite bus which was developed by Lockheed Corporation initially for the canceled WS-117L reconnaissance satellite program. Following the division of WS-117L into SAMOS and Corona for image intelligence, and MIDAS for early warning, the Agena was later used as an upper stage, and an integrated component, for several programs, including Corona reconnaissance satellites and the Agena Target Vehicle used to demonstrate rendezvous and docking during Project Gemini. It was used as an upper stage on the Atlas, Thor, Thorad and Titan IIIB rockets, and considered for others including the Space Shuttle and Atlas V. A total of 365 Agena rockets were launched between February 28, 1959 and February 1987. Only 33 Agenas carried NASA payloads and the vast majority were for DoD programs.

On some missions, the payload was built directly into the Agena, which provided it with electric power, communications and three-axis stabilization. Payload components were usually located ahead of the Agena's standard bulkhead. On missions where the payload was not built into the Agena, and instead separated after launch, the Agena was known as an Ascent Agena. The Agena was upgraded twice from the original Agena A in order to support heavier and more sophisticated satellites, such as Corona spacecraft with multiple and more powerful cameras.

The Agena name was suggested by the Department of Defense's Advanced Research Projects Agency for the star Beta Centauri, also known as Agena, because this upper stage would "ignite in the sky". This followed Lockheed's tradition of naming products for stellar phenomena.

The final launch was of an Agena D on February 12, 1987, configured as the upper stage of a Titan 34B. In all, 365 Agena vehicles were launched by NASA and the US Air Force.

== Characteristics ==
The Agena was 5.0 feet (1.5 m) in diameter, three-axis stabilized (for the benefit of the reconnaissance system cameras) and its Bell Aircraft XLR81 engine produced 16,000 lbs (71 kN) of thrust using unsymmetrical dimethylhydrazine (UDMH) as the fuel, and inhibited red fuming nitric acid (IRFNA) as the oxidizer. First versions used Type IIIA IRFNA with 14% of nitrogen dioxide, while later versions switched to Type IV High Density Acid (HDA) with 44% of nitrogen dioxide. HDA is more corrosive, but has higher density and increased performance. This is a hypergolic fuel/oxidizer combination, and as such, it does not need an ignition system. This rocket engine could be restarted multiple times in orbit, by radio command, and it frequently was. The engine was notable for its unusual aluminum construction. The regeneratively-cooled channels that cooled the throat and nozzle were formed from straight gun drill formed channels. The parabolic shape of the chamber throat made for a difficult gun-drilling problem, which Bell Aerosystems engineers solved by arranging the cooling channels in a "One-Sheeted Circular Hyperboloid" shape, allowing machinists to gun-drill straight cooling channels through the curved surfaces of the combustion chamber. The engine was derived from the XLR-81 propulsion unit for the canceled rocket-propelled nuclear warhead pod of the Convair B-58 Hustler bomber. Until 1959, the Agena was also known as the Discoverer Vehicle or Bell Hustler.

Attitude control of the horizontal flying Agena was provided by an inertial reference package with three gyroscopes, two horizon sensors, and cold-gas thrusters using a nitrogen-freon mixture. Pitch and roll were sensed by two hermetic integrating gyro units. A rate gyro unit determined yaw error by sensing orbital rate. Pitch and roll gyro errors were corrected from the horizon sensors, which were later supplemented by Sun and star trackers. This enabled the Agena to accommodate the higher pointing stability required for better ground resolution imaging with the improved Corona cameras.

As the Agena was designed to hold a fixed orientation in space while orbiting Earth, a passive thermal control system was devised.

The main source of the Agena's electrical power was silver peroxide-zinc batteries, which from the early 1960s on were supplemented by solar arrays. An S-band transponder enabled the Agena to receive ground command sequences (image motion compensation, altered attitude, etc.), which could be stored for later execution.

== Versions ==
Three versions of the Agena were flown:

=== Agena-A ===
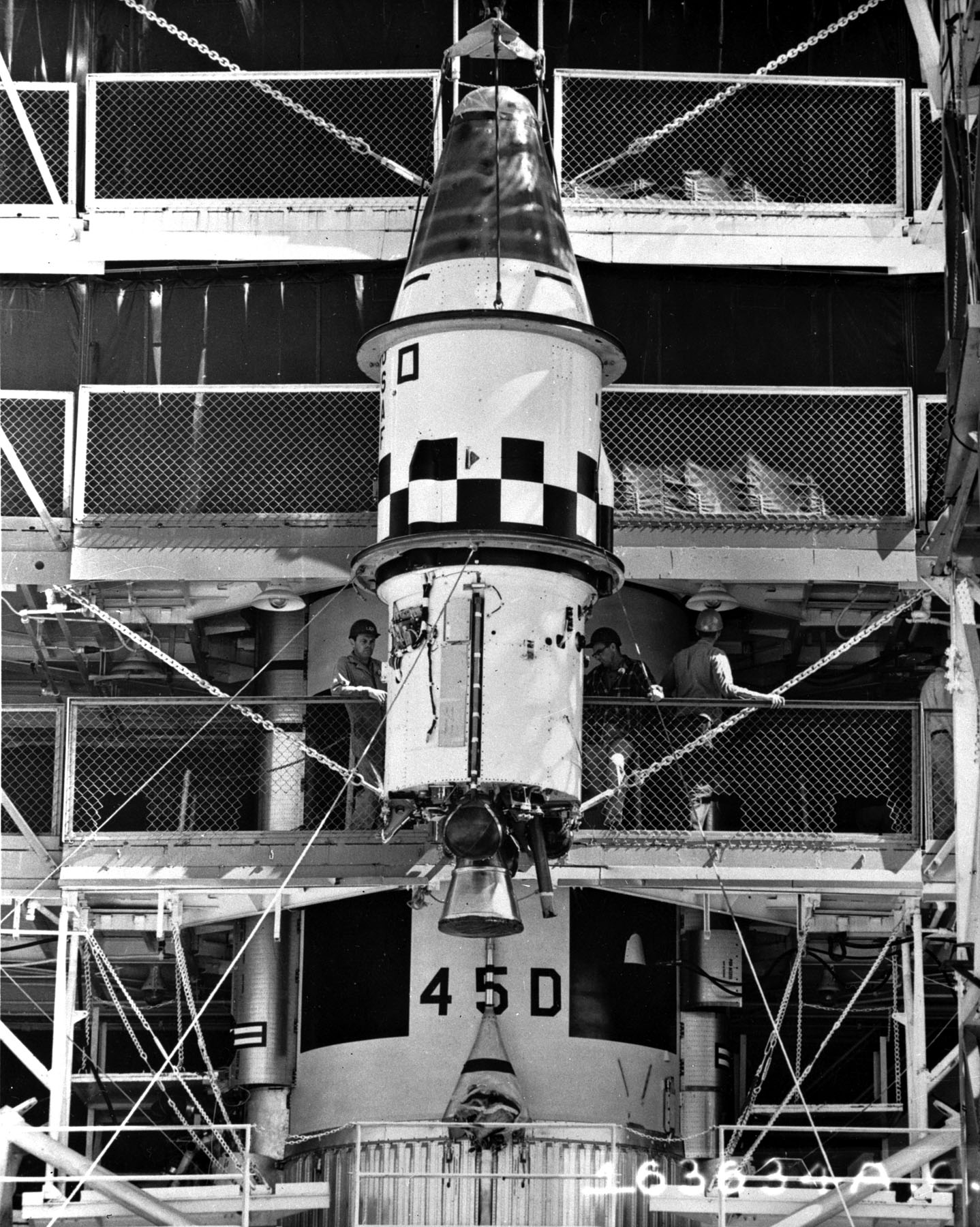
Agena A being positioned on top of an Atlas rocket

The Agena-A was the first type of Agena to be built. It was launched atop Thor and Atlas rockets, mostly into polar orbits from Vandenberg Air Force Base Launch Complex 75 and Point Arguello Launch Complex 1 respectively. Two Atlas launches occurred from Launch Complex 14 at Cape Canaveral.

The Agena-A was propelled by a Bell 8048 (XLR-81-BA-5) engine, which could produce 69 kN (about 15,500 lbs) of thrust with a burn time of 120 seconds.

Twenty Agena-As were launched between 1959 and 1961, all of them for the Discoverer, MIDAS, and Samos programs.

=== Agena-B ===
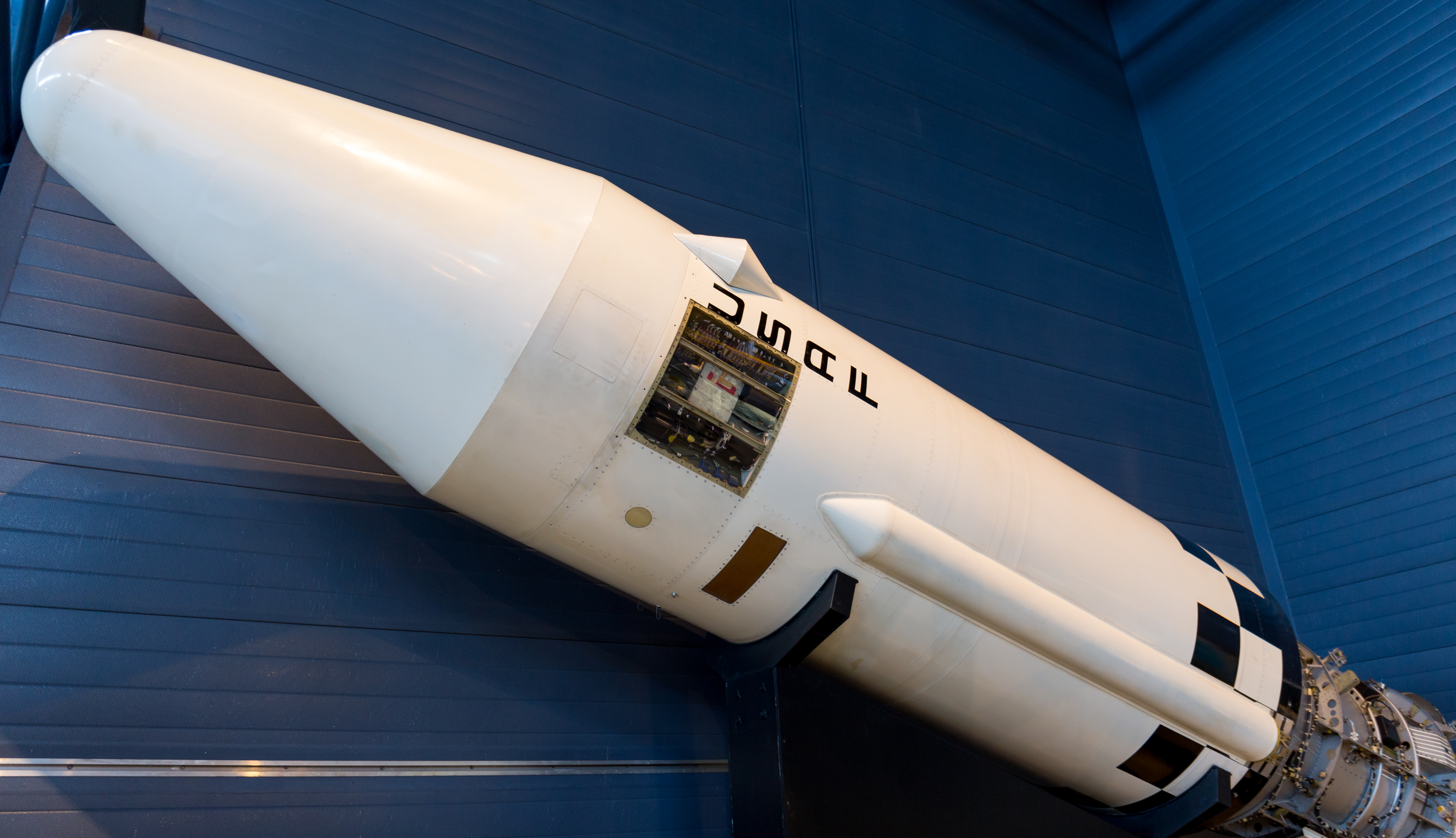
An Agena B on display at the Udvar-Hazy Center

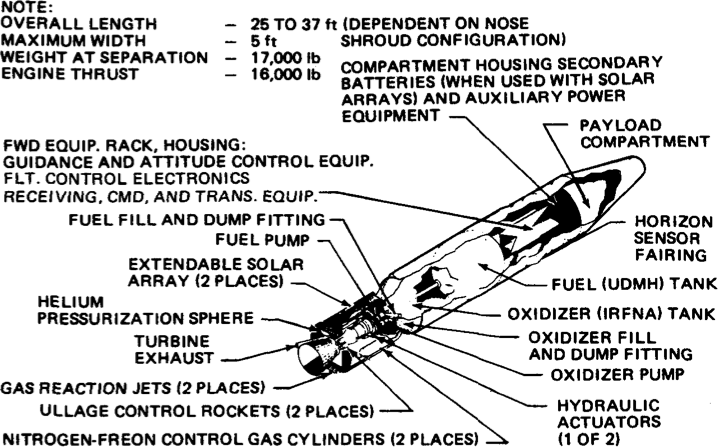
Schematics of Agena B

During 1960, Lockheed introduced the improved Agena-B, which could be restarted in orbit and had longer propellant tanks for increased burn time. It was launched atop Thor and Atlas rockets.

It was equipped with a Bell 8081 engine, which could generate 71 kN of thrust with a burn time of 240 seconds, and be restarted in orbit.

These launched the SAMOS-E, SAMOS-F (ELINT Ferret), and MIDAS (Missile Defense Alarm System) military early-warning satellites, Ranger lunar probes, Mariner planetary probes, OGO, and Nimbus satellites. Agena-B's first flight was the (unsuccessful) launch of Discoverer 16 on October 26, 1960. The Agena-B took months to be ready for Atlas launches and did not fly on that booster until Midas 3 on July 12, 1961. The final Agena-B flight was the launch of OGO 3 on June 7, 1966. A total of 76 were launched.

=== Agena-D ===
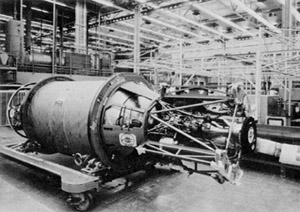
Standard Agena-D being delivered to final assembly area

The Agena D was the result of a proposal by Lockheed engineering executive Lawrence Edwards, who suggested standardizing the basic Agena configuration (up to this point, each Agena was custom-built for both the payload and the launch vehicle it was used with), and adding additional features depending on payload requirements, and a requirement from the Pentagon that the Agena be made compatible with the Titan rocket. This proposal originated in late 1962 when mounting frustration over the high failure rate of Thor and Atlas-Agena prompted the suggestion that greater standardization of launch vehicles would improve reliability. David N. Spires summarizes the standardization as follows:

The Agena D's common configuration included four usable modules containing the major guidance, beacon, power, and telemetry equipment, a standard payload console, and a rear rack above the engine for plug-in installation of optional gear-like solar panels, "piggyback" subsatellites, and an optional Bell Aerosystems engine that could be restarted in space as many as sixteen times.

Its orbital configuration had a diameter of 60 in (1.5 m) and a length of 248 in (6.3 m), and provided 19,500 Wh of electrical power from batteries. As of 2014, the Agena-D is the most-launched US upper stage. A special production line was set up to turn out 40 Agena-D spacecraft per year. Edwards remained responsible for the engineering for several years, until the Air Force declared the Agena-D as operational and froze its design. By the time of its retirement, the reliability of the Agena-D exceeded 95 percent.

It was launched atop Atlas, Thor, Thorad and Titan IIIB rockets. It was equipped with a Bell 8096 engine, which could generate 71 kN of thrust with a burn time of 265 seconds.

The first Agena-D launch was of KH-4 #7 on June 28, 1963, and a total of 269 Agena-Ds were launched. The Agena-D was used to launch KH-7 GAMBIT and KH-8 Gambit 3 reconnaissance satellites, three Mariner probes to Venus and the two Mariner space probes to Mars.

Thor-Agena flew for the last time in 1972 when it launched a KH-4B satellite. The last Atlas-Agena used an Agena D stage atop a refurbished Atlas F missile to launch Seasat in 1978. Twelve more Agenas were launched on Titan vehicles through 1987 before the stage was completely retired.

The final Agena-D upper stage was launched on a Titan IIIB rocket on February 12, 1987, carrying USA-21, the last SDS-1 satellite.

==== Agena Target Vehicle ====
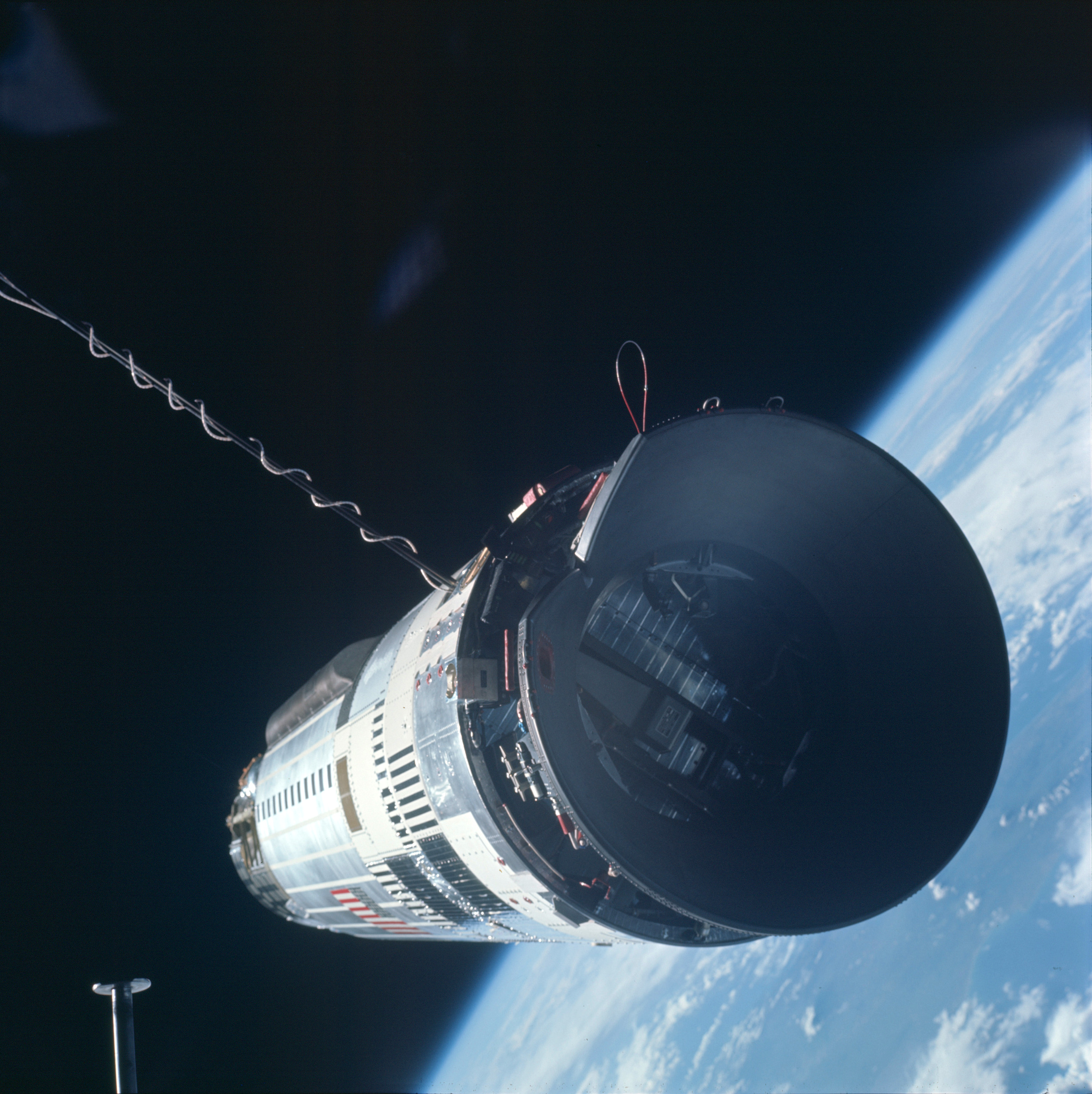
Agena Target Vehicle in space

The Agena Target Vehicle was based around the Agena-D, with equipment fitted to support use as a rendezvous and docking target for missions conducted as part of Project Gemini. It was equipped with a Bell Aerospace Model 8247 engine, which was qualified for up to 15 restarts. On later missions, the Agena's engine was fired while the Gemini spacecraft was docked, in order to boost the spacecraft to a higher orbit, and to bring it back again. During the Gemini 11 mission, an elliptical orbit with an apogee of 1,375 kilometers (854 mi) was reached, which set an altitude record for crewed spaceflight that held until Apollo 8, the first crewed mission to the Moon, exceeded it.

=== Other variants ===
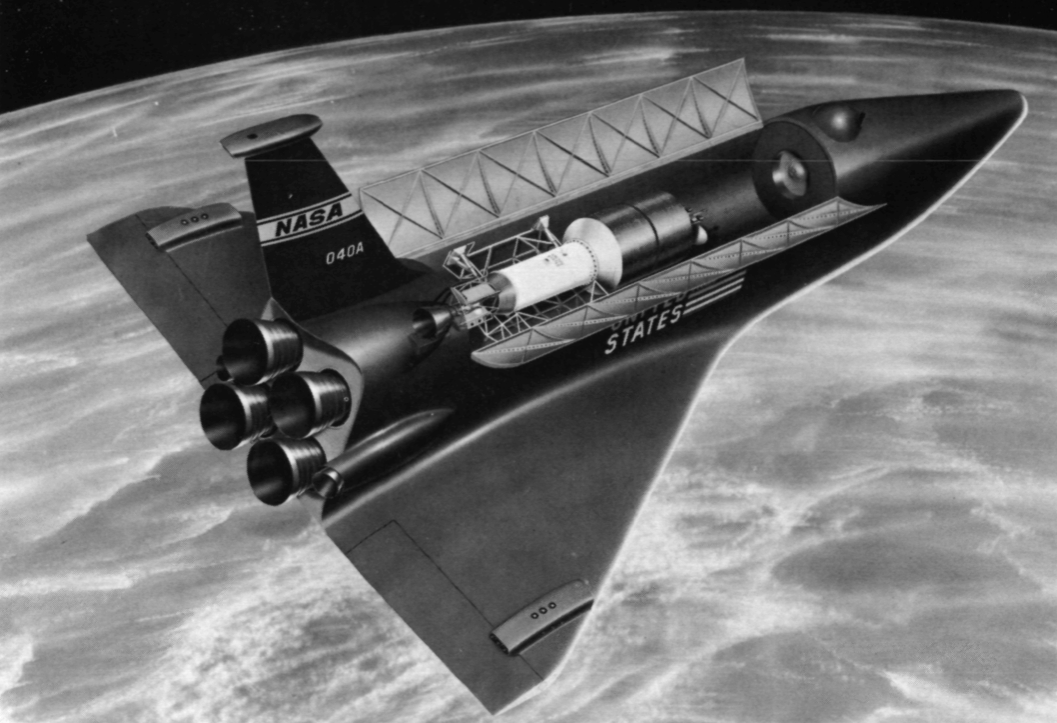
Agena and the Space Shuttle (1972 study)

In the early 1970s Lockheed studied the use of Agena as a payload booster in the Space Shuttle payload bay. An Agena-C with an increased diameter was proposed, but never built.

The Agena-2000 was intended as a modernized Agena, and would have been used on the Atlas V Light Evolved Expendable Launch Vehicle. The Atlas V Light was cancelled in favor of standardizing the Medium configuration, and as a result the Agena-2000 was never built.

== Launches ==
The first launch of an Agena-D was Agena Flight #64 on 27 June 1962. By the end of 1967, a total of 162 Agena-D had been launched:

Agena-D launch history
	Launches	Success	Failure		Cumulative
	Launches	Success	Agena	Booster	Cumulative
1962	8	8	–	–	8
1963	23	18	3	2	31
1964	35	32	3	–	66
1965	29	26	1	2	95
1966	39	36	2	1	134
1967	28	26	1	1	162
1968	21	20	–	1	183
1969	17	17	–	–	200
1970	14	14	–	–	214
1971	12	10	?	?	226
1972	8	6	?	?	234
1973	5	4	?	?	239
1974	3	3	–	–	242
1975	4	4	–	–	246
1976	4	4	–	–	250
1977	4	4	–	–	254
1978	4	4	–	–	258
1979	1	1	–	–	259
1980	1	1	–	–	260
1981	2	2?	–	–	262
1982	1	1	–	–	263
1983	2	2	–	–	265
1984	2	2	–	–	267
1985	1	1	–	–	268
1987	1	1	–	–	269
Total	269	245?	10?	6?	–

== Debris ==
Since many of the Agenas have remained in orbit long after they were needed, they've had time to break-up resulting in more orbital debris. They are thought to have exploded due to residual propellant igniting.

== See also ==
- Centaur (rocket stage)

Related lists

- List of military aircraft of the United States
- List of missiles
