= Bell Model 8000 family =

American Agena rocket motor (1963–1984)

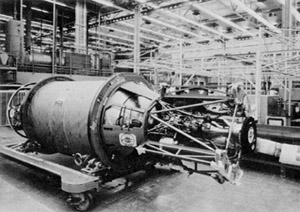
Bell Model 8096 on an Agena D

The Bell Aerosystems Company Model 8000 family were American liquid-propellant rocket engines. Starting as an air-launched missile engine and finishing as a multi-mission general propulsion for the space age, the basic design went through a series of iterations and versions that enabled it to have a long and productive career.

Mainly used on the Agena upper stage, it burned UDMH and RFNA fed by a turbopump in a fuel rich gas generator cycle. The turbopump had a single turbine with a gearbox to transmit power to the oxidizer and fuel pumps. The thrust chamber was all-aluminum, and regeneratively cooled by oxidizer flowing through gun-drilled passages in the combustion chamber and throat walls. The nozzle was a titanium radiatively cooled extension. The engine was mounted on a hydraulic actuated gimbal which enabled thrust vectoring to control pitch and yaw. Engine thrust and mixture ratio were controlled by cavitating flow venturis on the gas generator flow circuit. Engine start was achieved by solid propellant start cartridge.

== Variants ==
=== Bell Model 117 / XLR81 ===
USAF designation XLR81. Also known as the Bell Hustler Rocket Engine. The engine was developed for the B-58 Hustler Powered Disposable Bomb Pod. It reached a maturity of development where its performance was confirmed through a Performance Flight Rating Test. However, the project was cancelled before it could be flight-tested. It burned JP-4 aircraft kerosene as fuel and used red fuming nitric acid (RFNA) as oxidant, to supply a thrust of 67 kN (15,000 lbf).

=== Bell Model 8001 / XLR81-BA-3 ===
USAF designation XLR81-BA-3. It was used on the Agena-A prototype. It was based on the Bell Model 117. It only needed a gimbal mount to provide thrust vectoring, relocating the gas generator exhaust port to enable the gimbal movement and addition of a nozzle closure as major modifications. As its predecessor, it burned RFNA and JP-4 propellant and had a thrust of 67 kN (15,000 lbf) with an I_{sp} of 265.5 s (2.604 km/s) with its 15:1 expansion ratio. Its rated duration was 100 seconds and only launched twice. The first flight was on 28 February 1959.

=== Bell Model 8048 / XLR81-BA-5 ===
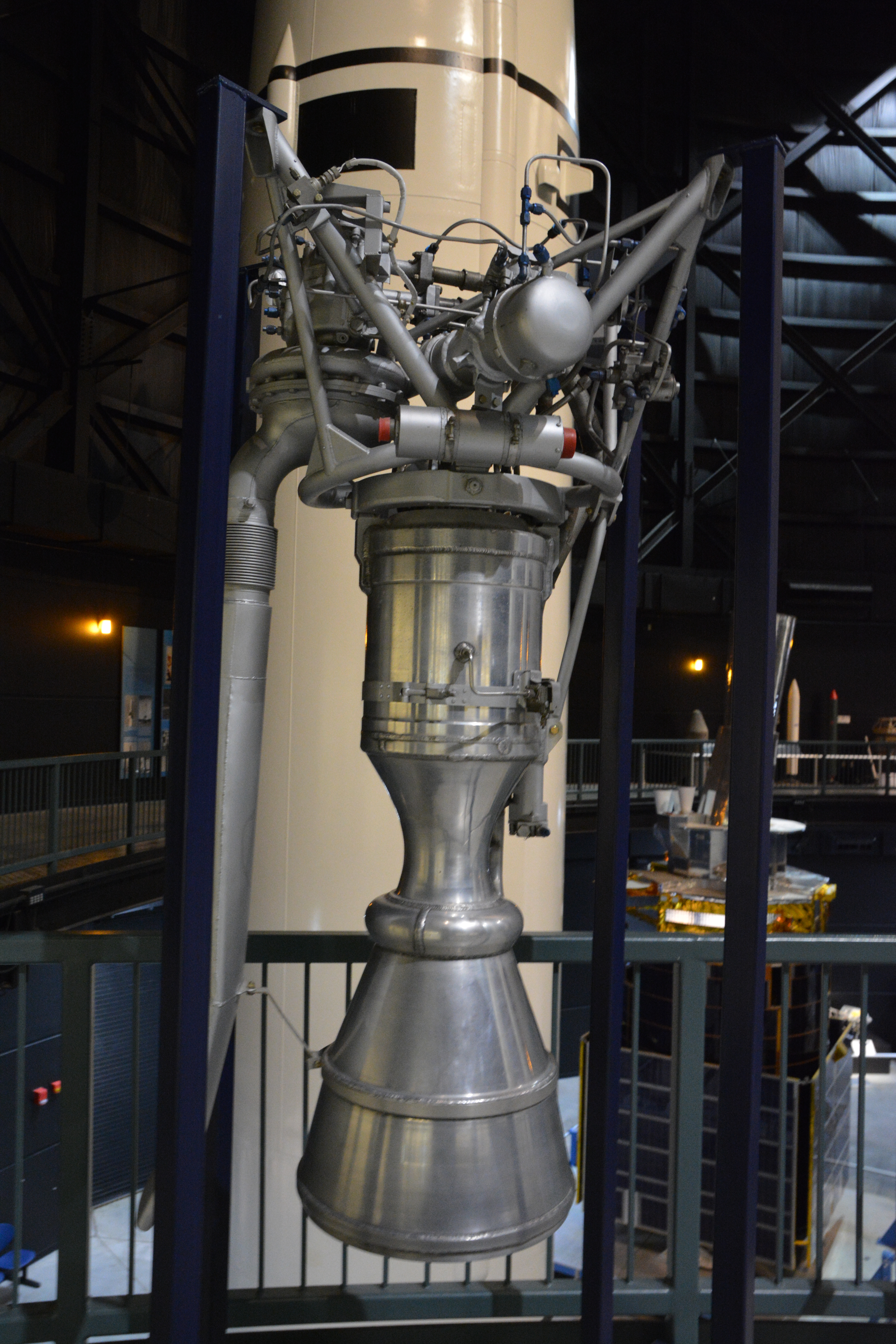
Bell Model 8048 used on the Agena-A

Also known as the XLR81-BA-5. Used on the Agena-A, it switched propellants to the hypergolic RFNA and UDMH. Since the mixture self-ignites on contact, the engine could be greatly simplified. For example, the combustion chamber ignition system was eliminated. The most important system was the passive thrust regulating system. The use of a series of venturi holes in the gas generator allowed it to supply a 67 kN (15,000 lbf) with just a 1.6 kN (350 lbf) variability without moving parts. Also, the expansion ratio was increased to 20:1 which enabled it to achieve an I_{sp} of 276 s (2.71 km/s). First flew on January 21, 1959 and last flew on January 31, 1961. It was used for the first American experience on vacuum starting an engine, since it was believed at the time that engines would need atmospheric pressure for start-up.

=== Bell Model 8081 / XLR81-BA-7 ===
This version was the first designed to have two restart capability, by use of three ignition cartridges, and extensive validation of vacuum starting behavior. Thrust was increased to 71 kN (16,000 lbf) and expansion ratio to 45:1 for an I_{sp} of 293 s (2.87 km/s). USAF designation XLR81-BA-7. Used on the Agena-B, it first flew on December 20, 1960 and last flight was on May 15, 1966.

=== Bell Model 8096 / XLR81-BA-11 / YLR81-BA-11 ===
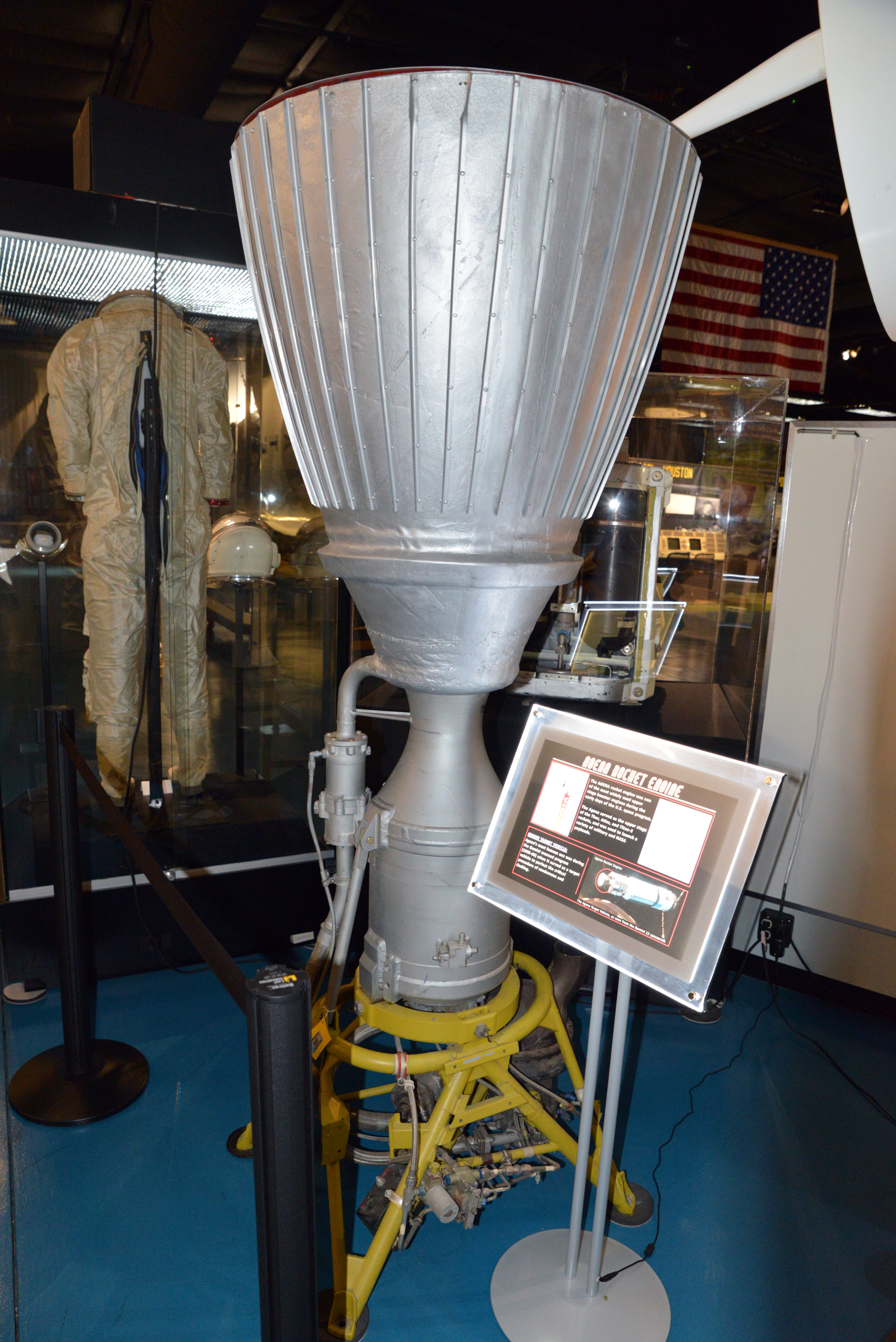
Bell Model 8096 used on the Agena-D

USAF designation XLR81-BA-11 and later, YLR81-BA-11. Main production version, used on the Agena-D. It added to the 8081 a titanium with molybdenum reinforcements nozzle extension, which enabled it to reach an I_{sp} of 280 s (2.7 km/s). It also added inducers to the turbopumps, reducing the pressurization requirements on the tanks. In 1968, restart capability was increased to three restarts.

=== Bell Model 8096-39 ===
This was a version that switched oxidizer to MIL-P-7254F Nitric Acid Type IV — known as HDA (High Density Acid) — mixture of 55% nitric acid and 44% N_{2}O_{4} with some hydrogen fluoride as a corrosion inhibitor, providing more performance than standard IRFNA. It achieved a thrust of 76 kN (17,000 lbf) with an I_{sp} of 300 s (2.9 km/s).

=== Bell Model 8096A ===
A proposed improvement over the 8096-39 that would increase the size of the nozzle extension at an expansion ratio of 75:1, achieving an I_{sp} of 312 s (3.06 km/s).

=== Bell Model 8096B ===
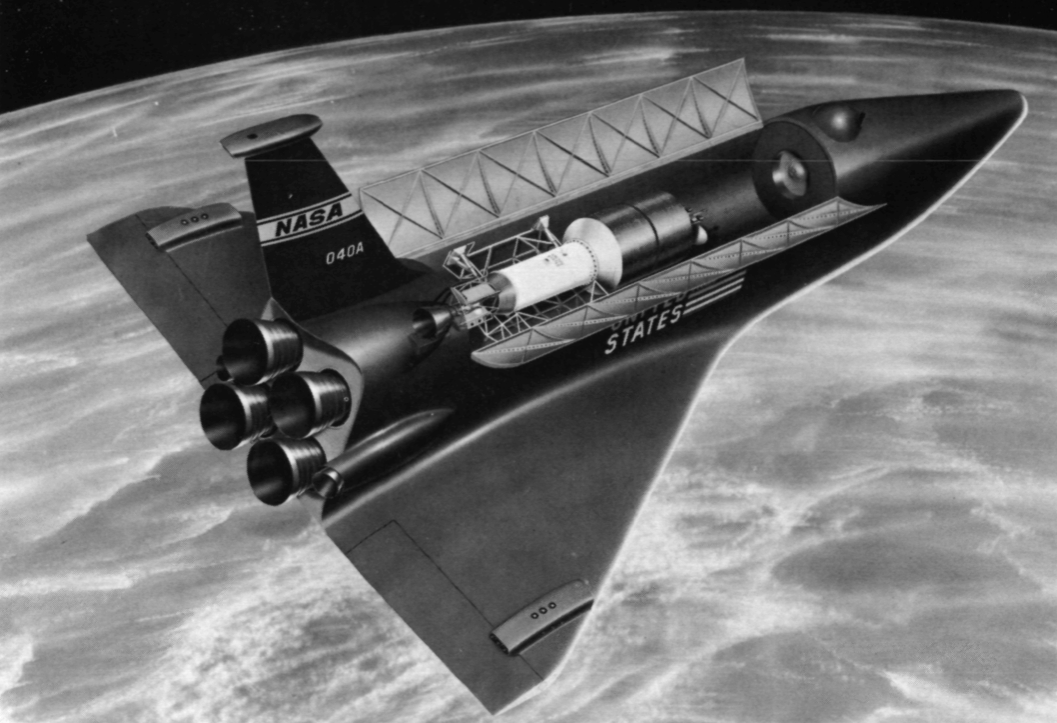
Agena booster satellite in the Space Shuttle payload bay (study from 1972)

Proposed version for use with an Agena based reusable upper stage for the Space Shuttle. It would switch propellant to MMH plus hexamethyldisilazone (HMZ) and N_{2}O_{4} on a 1.78 mixture ratio and add a niobium nozzle with a 100:1 expansion ratio for an increase in I_{sp} to 327 s (3.21 km/s), or 330 s (3.2 km/s) with a 150:1 nozzle. The propellant change would require modification of the gas generator venturi holes to achieve power balance with the new performance without redesigning the turbopump. The chamber pressure would be reduced to 3.35 MPa (486 psi). Within the same actuators, it enable to increase the gimbal angle to 3 degrees, change engine clocking to reduce oil leakage. It would decrease the coolant passage diameter, since the new oxidizer could stay within specification at a higher flow velocity. The injector would change from flat to a 5-legged baffle, the pump seals would be improved and the oxidizer valve would change to a torque motor design. It would also implement some material changes in the turbopump bearings that would eliminate the oxidizer boiling that prevented a restart in the 15 minute to 3 hours period after an ignition. The multi start capabilities of the 8247 would have been ported. This would enable up to 200 starts. Also, single burn life was expanded to 1200 seconds.

=== Bell Model 8096L ===
Since the 8096B would require expensive changes in propellant handling, a middle step was proposed. It would switch fuel to MMH plus hexamethyldisilazone (HMZ), while keeping the same oxidant as the 8096-39, and change the mixture ratio at 2.03. The rest of the changes were the same as the 8096B, except that it would keep the same cooling channel diameter as the 8096, the chamber pressure would be reduced to 3.34 MPa (484 psi), and the niobium nozzle would have a 150:1 expansion ratio. The restart capabilities would be 10 to 100 starts depending on certification effort.

=== Bell Model 8247 / XLR81-BA-13 ===
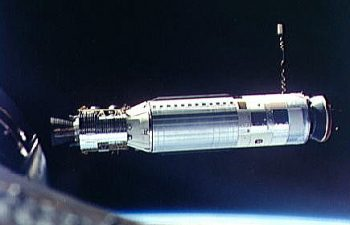
Agena target vehicle, rocket engine to the left.

USAF designation XLR81-BA-13. Used on the Agena target vehicle and as a pure upper stage in the form of the Ascent Agena. It added a new system that allowed multiple restarts. The system replaced the start up cartridges for two metallic bellows on the oxidizer and fuel tank, which could supply enough pressure for start up. Once the turbopump reached its peak power, the outlet pressure was used to refill those bellows, and thus it recharged itself. While it was rated at 15 restarts, in practice it never did more than 8, which were performed during the Gemini XI mission.

=== Bell Model 8533 ===
A program to develop an upgraded version of the 8247. It switched propellants to UDMH and N_{2}O_{4} and had general performance improvements. The propellant switch not only enabled better performance, but also allowed it to stay fueled on the pad for periods of time longer than 15 days.

== See also ==
- RM-81 Agena
- Thor-Agena
- Thorad-Agena
- Atlas-Agena
- Titan (rocket)
