= Gravity-vacuum transit =

Form of transportation

Gravity-vacuum transit (GVT) was a form of transportation developed by American inventor Lawrence Edwards in the early 1960s.

== Origin ==
The origin of this technology is Alfred Ely Beach in 1965. When the U.S. Department of Defense charged all contractors to contemplate what will sustain them if defense funding should taper off, Lockheed Management called for ideas from the troops. Over the long weekend following the assassination of U.S. President John F. Kennedy, Edwards sorted through industries and product lines, and focused on passenger railroads, which had lost their former popularity due to the speed of airplanes and the convenience of automobiles. He wondered if trains could travel at airplane speed and converge at city centers rather than at airports 20 miles away.

To avoid high g-forces, high-speed transportation requires nearly straight paths. Shallow tunnels must curve often to avoid the jumble of buildings, subways, and utilities immediately underground. But just a little deeper, near-straight tunnels would be practical, even passing beneath rivers and bays alongside multiple major cities. This pointed to a design with each tunnel enclosing a pair of steel tubes for two-way traffic, each tube having been pumped out until the air pressure is below that experienced by modern passenger planes.

Drawing on the wisdom of technologists and urban planners, as well as lengthy visits to major libraries, Edwards progressively synthesized his system wherein trains nearly ten feet in diameter and with 500 – 1500 passengers would speed up to 250 mph (urban) and 400 mph (regional) through the tubes, protected from the weather and other hazards. The Regional Plan Association offered tips and encouragement, visualizing three major suburban lines passing through Manhattan, New York. It also published a map for Boston to Washington, D.C., with the Manhattan-to-Washington portion taking only 75 minutes, even with over 10 intermediate stops.

== Specifics ==
The key to this dramatic performance, validated in peer-reviewed professional papers, is the combined effect of vacuum and gravity. Leaving a station with full atmospheric pressure behind it but near-vacuum ahead, the train is subject to 75 tons of thrust, far exceeding what a locomotive can do at moderate speeds. Approaching the next station, the train is decelerated by a similar pressure differential, but in reverse. Passengers experience swift but acceptable acceleration/ deceleration, provided designers are careful not to make the steel cars too light.

There is no propulsive equipment on the train at all; instead, there are massive (but commercial-scale) vacuum pumps steadily pulling air out of the tubes and exhausting it outdoors. And their task is eased by the fact that the amount of air admitted to the tube to accelerate a train is only a little more than that pushed back into the atmosphere as the vehicle comes to a stop. The pumps make up the difference, and can do that while running at a constant rate. Stanford's Dr. Holt Ashley, while a national science executive in 1974, was asked about GVT and stated that it was "the most energy-efficient form of transportation we ever saw."

== Unique features ==
GVT has a powerful advantage not shared by airplanes or any form of transit that moves horizontally. Rolling down a moderate slope, for example 20%, there is robust acceleration that the passengers "don't feel at all". This can be superimposed on the pneumatic acceleration discussed above. Then, with the maximum tunnel depth limited to about 1000 feet, gravity alone can add 100 mph to the train's speed at the midpoint of a three-mile segment, for an elapsed time of 1.5 minutes stop-to-stop without exceeding customary passenger-comfort limits. The essential feature of this phenomenon was recognized by a British engineer, Kearney, in about 1910; he wanted to apply it to streetcars but couldn't convince his peers and it was forgotten." Edwards read of it in the New York public library, adapted it for vastly higher speeds, and improvised ways to convince the skeptics.

This unique feature was further validated in a contract study by Johns Hopkins University Applied Physics Laboratory and others.

== End of the line ==
Further study and lab tests of GVT were suggested, but these were not funded, and were a casualty of a general cutback in Federal funding for most forms of advanced rail transit in 1969. Edwards' company, Tube Transit Inc., closed its doors and he went on to pursue an aerial transit system, Project 21 Monobeam, which was first conceived as a local system to feed passengers to GVT.
