= Lawrence Edwards =

American innovator in aerospace and ground transportation

Lawrence K. Edwards (July 10, 1919 – April 4, 2009) was an American innovator in aerospace and ground transportation. Early in his career, he pioneered technologies for U.S. space and missile defense programs. He went on to invent and promote high-speed Gravity-Vacuum Transit and monobeam rail transit. He obtained a total of fourteen patents in those areas.

== Early life and education ==
Edwards was born in Delaware, Ohio. He was the son of a physics professor and was raised in Oxford, Ohio. He graduated Phi Beta Kappa from Miami University where he studied geology, math and physics.

== Accomplishments in aerospace ==
Edwards played a role in the engineering of four of the nation's major aerospace programs:

- Talos, a long-range surface-to-air missile that served as the U.S. Navy's primary anti-aircraft missile for 20 years. Talos was history's first supersonic missile with ramjet propulsion, making it far more fuel-efficient than rockets. Edwards was project engineer for the program at McDonnell Aircraft Corp., which later became McDonnell Douglas.
- Polaris, the first in a succession of submarine-based Fleet Ballistic Missiles. Edwards managed its preliminary design at Lockheed Missile Systems Division, (now Lockheed Martin) and continued as assistant director for systems engineering during the missile's early development.
- Lockheed Agena, which became America's most-used space vehicle. Agena's first use was to support cameras and recoverable film of Corona, history's first spy satellite, providing intelligence for four successive Presidents. Additional uses included the first successful cameras to the moon, Venus and Mars and propelling Gemini astronauts to world-record speed and altitude. Edwards was instrumental in debugging the troubled A and B versions of Agena and then initiated the Agena D.
- Space Shuttle: Edwards' aerospace achievements paved the way for his appointment as Director of Shuttle Engineering at NASA headquarters. He later became Chief of Advanced Space Transportation. In addition, he served as NASA's primary DOD technical interface for the Strategic Defense Initiative and on NASA's Inventions and Contributions Board.

== Accomplishments in ground transportation ==
Edwards briefs Transportation Secretary John Volpe (second from left) on Gravity-Vacuum Transit

Edwards founded three firms dedicated to his innovations in ground transportation, Tube Transit Corp., Transit Innovations and Futrex Inc. His pursuits in this field include:

- Inventing and promoting gravity-vacuum transit, a technology that combines gravity and atmospheric pressure to speed trains through evacuated underground tubes at 250 to 400 mph. Advocated for the New York City region as well as a Boston to Washington line by the Regional Plan Association; the invention was praised by Secretary of Transportation John Volpe as well as editorials in The New York Times and professional and scientific journals. It was the lead article in the August 1965 edition of Scientific American.
- Inventing and promoting the Project 21 moonbeam, later System 21, the world's only aerial rail system suitable for networks above city streets. Whereas a classical monorail requires a pair of beams for two-way traffic and its switching limitations hinder its ability to run on networks, the mono-beam carries opposite trains alongside a single slender beam; its footprint is smaller, and its breakthrough switching technology enables it to form networks. System 21 was praised by two Secretaries of Transportation and Vice President Al Gore as well as the Regional Plan Association in two federally supported books. In March 1989, the Federal Register noted, "This project has high technical merit representing an innovative technology which has a strong possibility of allowing for future reductions in the nation's energy consumption."
- Inventing and publicizing Project 32 Slalom, a compact three-wheel vehicle designed for students and suburban commuters. Edwards' patented suspension lets the vehicle lean into turns like a bicycle and, in very sharp turns, dramatically reduces the lateral forces experienced in four-wheel vehicles.

== Honors and awards ==
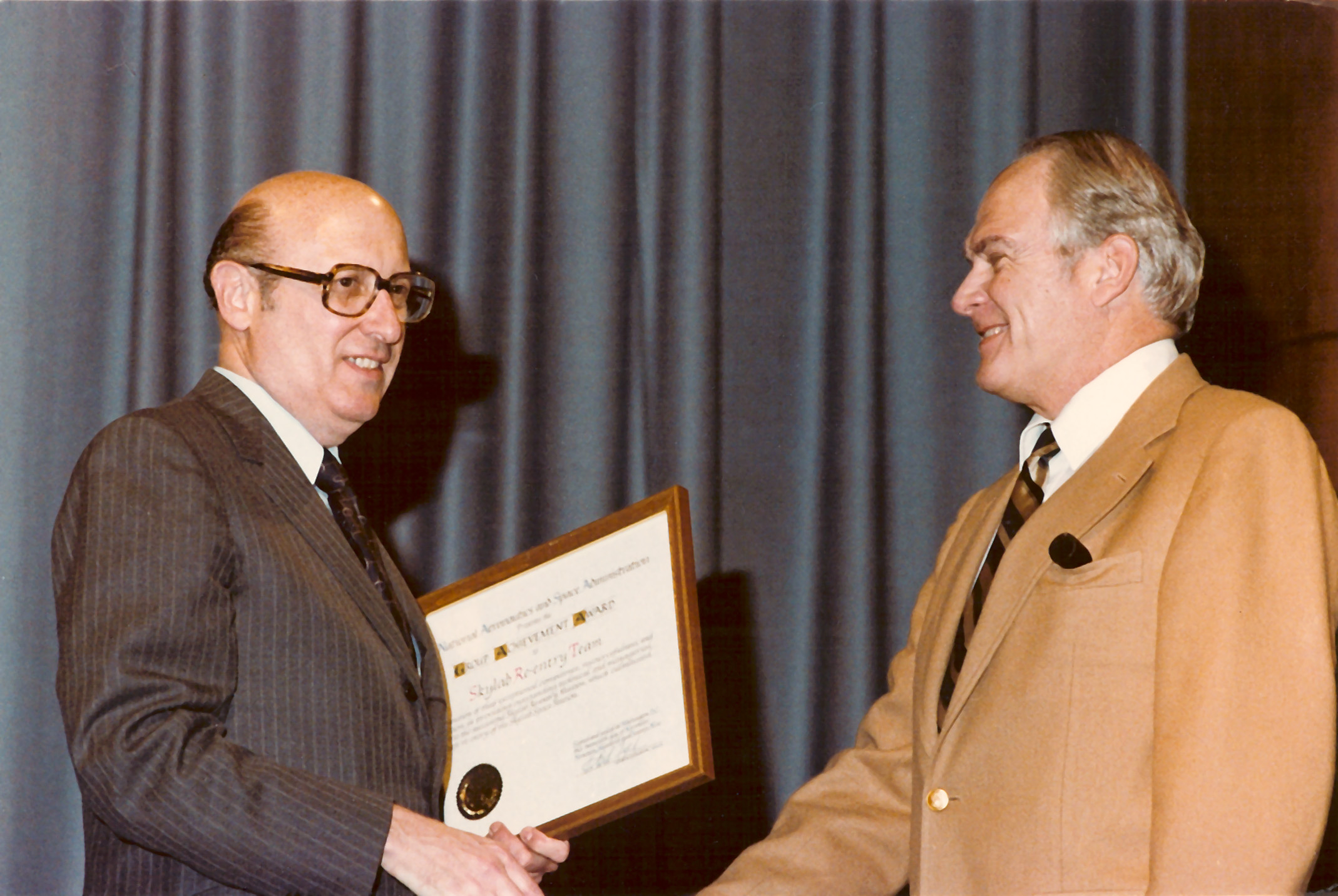
NASA Administrator Robert Frosch (left), presents the Skylab Award to Edwards, team leader

Edwards was twice nominated by Lockheed executives for the National Medal of Technology, the highest honor for technological achievement in the United States. In 1980, NASA awarded him a team leadership award for his role in the Skylab Reentry Program. His inventions have been publicized in dozens of national newspapers, magazines and books. On three occasions, they were illustrated as "Patent of the Week" in the New York Times.

Edwards received six federal grants for his work in Gravity-Vacuum Transit and System 21. Additionally, $1.25 million in Commerce Department funds supported the construction of a functional scale model of System 21 in Charleston, South Carolina. It was unveiled in 1996.

== Professional affiliations ==
Edwards was a member of the Society of Automotive Engineers and the Cosmos Club. He was also an associate fellow of the American Institute of Aeronautics and Astronautics and a member of the American Society of Mechanical Engineers, American Society of Civil Engineers, and the Transportation Research Board of the National Academy of Sciences.
