= Agena target vehicle =

Uncrewed spacecraft used during NASA's Gemini program

Gemini-Agena Target Vehicle
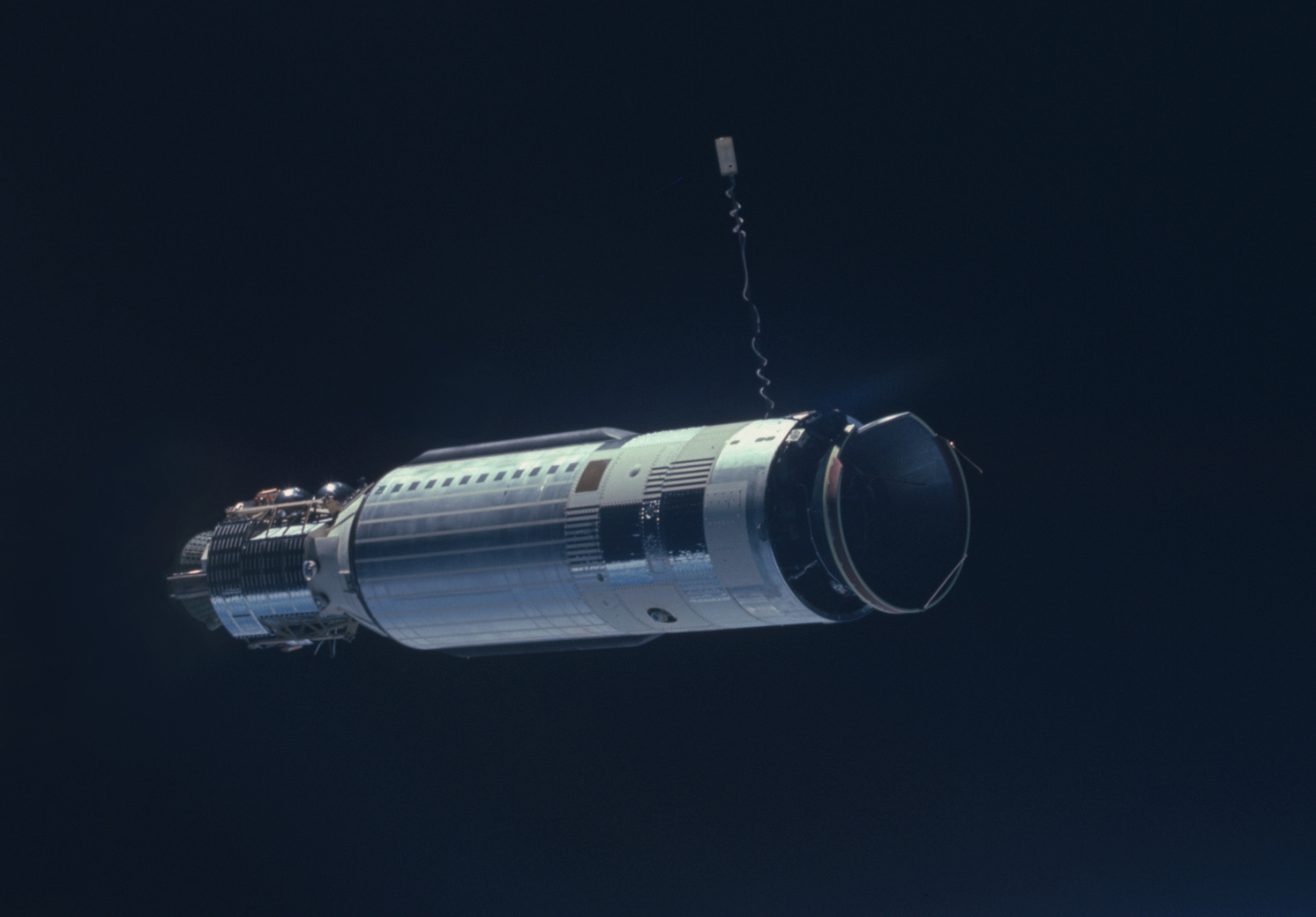
- Manufacturer: Lockheed Aircraft; McDonnell Aircraft
- Country of origin: United States
- Operator: NASA
- Applications: Docking target; Space tug

Specifications
- Launch mass: 18,030–18,100 pounds (8,180–8,210 kg)
- Dry mass: 4,012–4,085 pounds (1,820–1,853 kg)
- Dimensions: 5 feet (1.52 m) diameter; 26 feet (7.92 m) long
- Power: Batteries
- Equipment: Guidance; Flight control electronics; Telemetry; Command; Tracking; Propellant pressurization

Production
- Status: Retired
- Built: 7
- Launched: 7
- Failed: 3
- Maiden launch: October 25, 1965
- Last launch: November 11, 1966

Related spacecraft
- Derived from: Agena-D
- Derivatives: Augmented Target Docking Adapter
- Flown with: Gemini

The Agena Target Vehicle (/əˈdʒiːnə/; ATV), also known as Gemini-Agena Target Vehicle (GATV), was an uncrewed spacecraft used by NASA during its Gemini program to develop and practice orbital space rendezvous and docking techniques, and to perform large orbital changes, in preparation for the Apollo program lunar missions. The spacecraft was based on Lockheed Aircraft's Agena-D upper stage rocket, fitted with a docking target manufactured by McDonnell Aircraft. The name 'Agena' derived from the star Beta Centauri, also known as Agena. The combined spacecraft was a 26-foot (7.92 m)-long cylinder with a diameter of 5 feet (1.52 m), placed into low Earth orbit with the Atlas-Agena launch vehicle. It carried about 14,000 pounds (6,400 kg) of propellant and gas at launch, and had a gross mass at orbital insertion of about 7,200 pounds (3,300 kg).

The ATV for Gemini 6 failed on launch on October 25, 1965, which led NASA to develop a backup: the Augmented Target Docking Adapter (ATDA), a smaller spacecraft consisting of the docking target with an attitude control propulsion system but without the Agena orbital change rocket. The ATDA was used once on Gemini 9A after a second ATV launch failure on May 17, 1966, but failed as a docking target because its launch shroud failed to separate.

== Operations ==
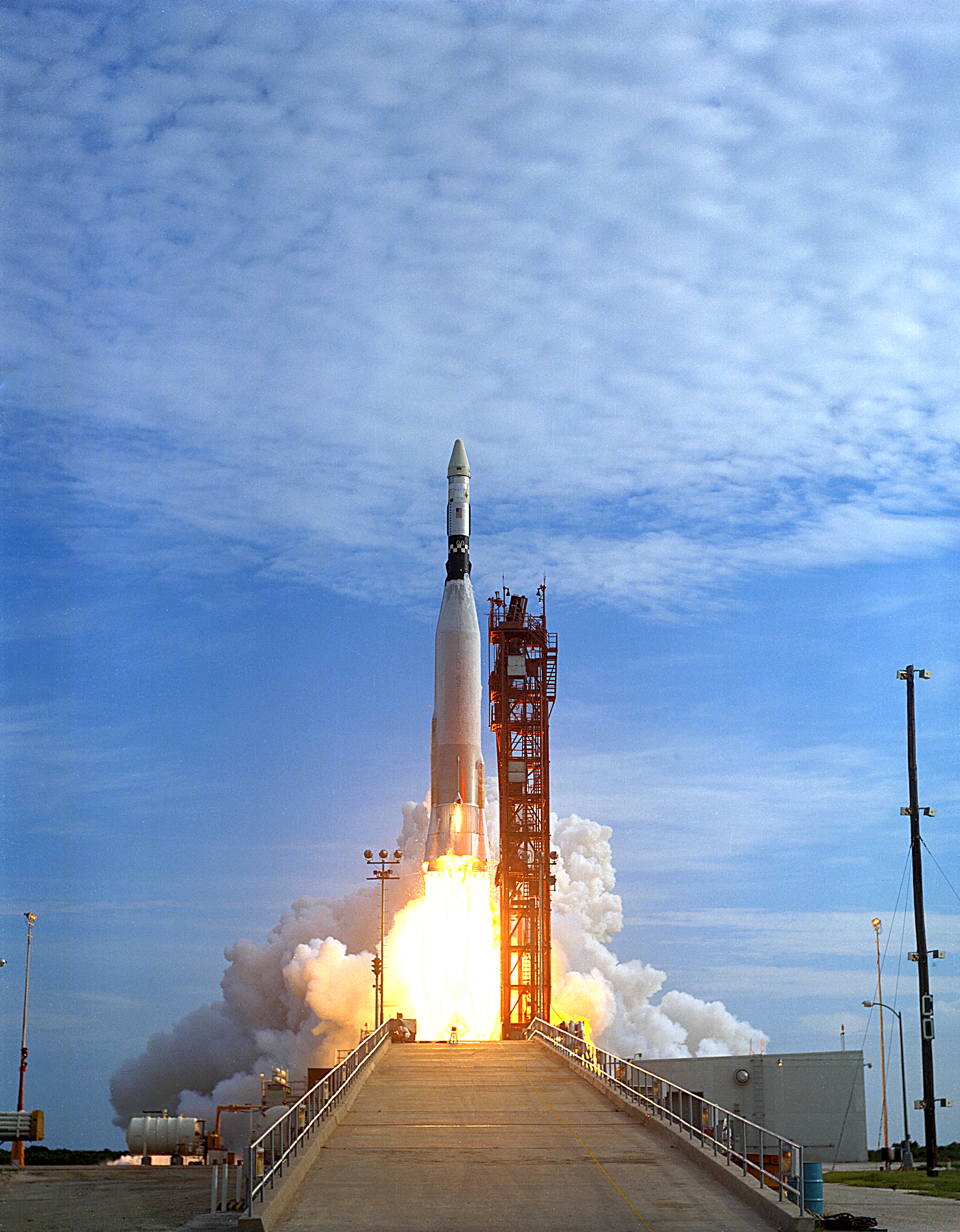
An Atlas-Agena launch vehicle launches GATV-5006 into orbit for the Gemini 11 mission.

Each ATV consisted of an Agena-D-derivative upper rocket stage built by Lockheed Aircraft and a docking adapter built by McDonnell Aircraft. The Agena was launched from Cape Kennedy's Launch Complex 14 on top of an Atlas booster built by the Convair division of General Dynamics. The Agena first burn would occur shortly after shroud jettison and separation from the Atlas over the Atlantic Ocean. Over Ascension Island, a second burn would place the Agena into a low circular orbit.

The McDonnell Gemini spacecraft would then be launched from Launch Complex 19, as soon as 90 minutes later. Both countdowns would proceed in parallel and required close synchronization. The Gemini would rendezvous and dock with the Agena as soon as Gemini's first orbit toward the end of the program. Gemini 11's Richard F. Gordon, Jr. compared docking with the Agena to air-to-air refueling:

You get yourself lined up, maybe five to ten feet out. And if everything looks all right and you look lined up with the docking cone, all you do is add a little thrust with the translational controller. And if it looks like you're going too fast you take a little off with the translational controller. And just like flying an aerial refueling, you did all this with just the old Mark-VIII eyeball.

Once docked, the astronaut in the right seat could control Agena's thrusters and engine. They would fly the combined spacecraft in a stabilized mode and perform a number of experiments:

- Using the Agena's attitude control system to stabilize the combination, which saved the Gemini's propellants
- Extra-vehicular activity to perform practice work on a tool panel. This required installing handrails on later flights to prevent excessive astronaut exertion.
- Refiring the Agena engine to raise the spacecraft's apogee. Gemini 11 reached a record of 739.2 nautical miles (1,369.0 km). The modified Bell 8247 engine was qualified for up to 15 restarts.
- Undocking, unreeling a 50-foot (15 m) nylon tether between the capsule and the Agena and flying in a "dumbbell" configuration with the Agena below the astronauts, to check the gravitational effect on the formation stability in uncontrolled mode. This technique is now known as gravity-gradient stabilization.
- Using a similar tether and a few thruster bursts to rotate the two craft around each other as an early test of artificial gravity.
- After rendezvous with its own ATV, Gemini 10 performed a second rendezvous with the ATV from Gemini 8.

After detaching from their respective Gemini capsules, Agena target vehicles continued to execute post-mission operations under ground control. For instance, GATV 5003, post-separation from Gemini 8, underwent extensive systems testing. Its main engine was fired nine times, and it executed 5,000 commands, surpassing the contractual requirement of 1,000. This allowed a detailed assessment of its command and communication systems. The vehicle was eventually placed in a 220 nmi (410 km; 250 mi) circular decay orbit, facilitating its observation during the Gemini 10 mission. Similarly, GATV 5005 performed three orbital maneuvers post-Gemini 10 separation, including adjustments to study temperature effects in varying orbits and executing 1,700 commands, some of which were relayed from Gemini 10.

The first Gemini-Agena Target Vehicle (GATV) was launched on October 25, 1965, while the Gemini 6 astronauts were waiting on the pad. While the Atlas performed normally, the Agena's engine exploded during orbital injection. Since the rendezvous and docking was the primary objective, the Gemini 6 mission was scrubbed, and replaced with the alternate mission Gemini 6A, which rendezvoused (but could not dock) with Gemini 7 in December.

An investigation into the failure concluded that it was most likely caused by design modifications to the GATV versus a standard Agena D stage. The Agena D was designed to have its engine restarted just once while the GATV would need to be restarted five times. While a standard Agena D pumped oxidizer into the combustion chamber first and then followed with the fuel, the GATV was modified to do the reverse because the normal start method had a tendency to leak oxidizer. While this would not be a problem for the Agena D with its single restart, the multi-restart GATV would eventually lose all of its oxidizer before the stage's operating life (which would last weeks instead of hours) could be completed. Unfortunately, pumping the fuel into the combustion chamber first caused the engine to backfire and rupture from mechanical shock. It was found out that Lockheed engineers did not properly test the GATV to root out this problem (it had been tested at a simulated altitude of 21 miles up when actual Agena engine start would occur at around 75 miles up). The solution to the problem was switching back to the normal oxidizer-first engine start and also testing the GATV in appropriate conditions. Bell Aerosystems, the manufacturer of the Agena's engine, were also instructed to perform further ground-level tests.

== Augmented Target Docking Adapter ==
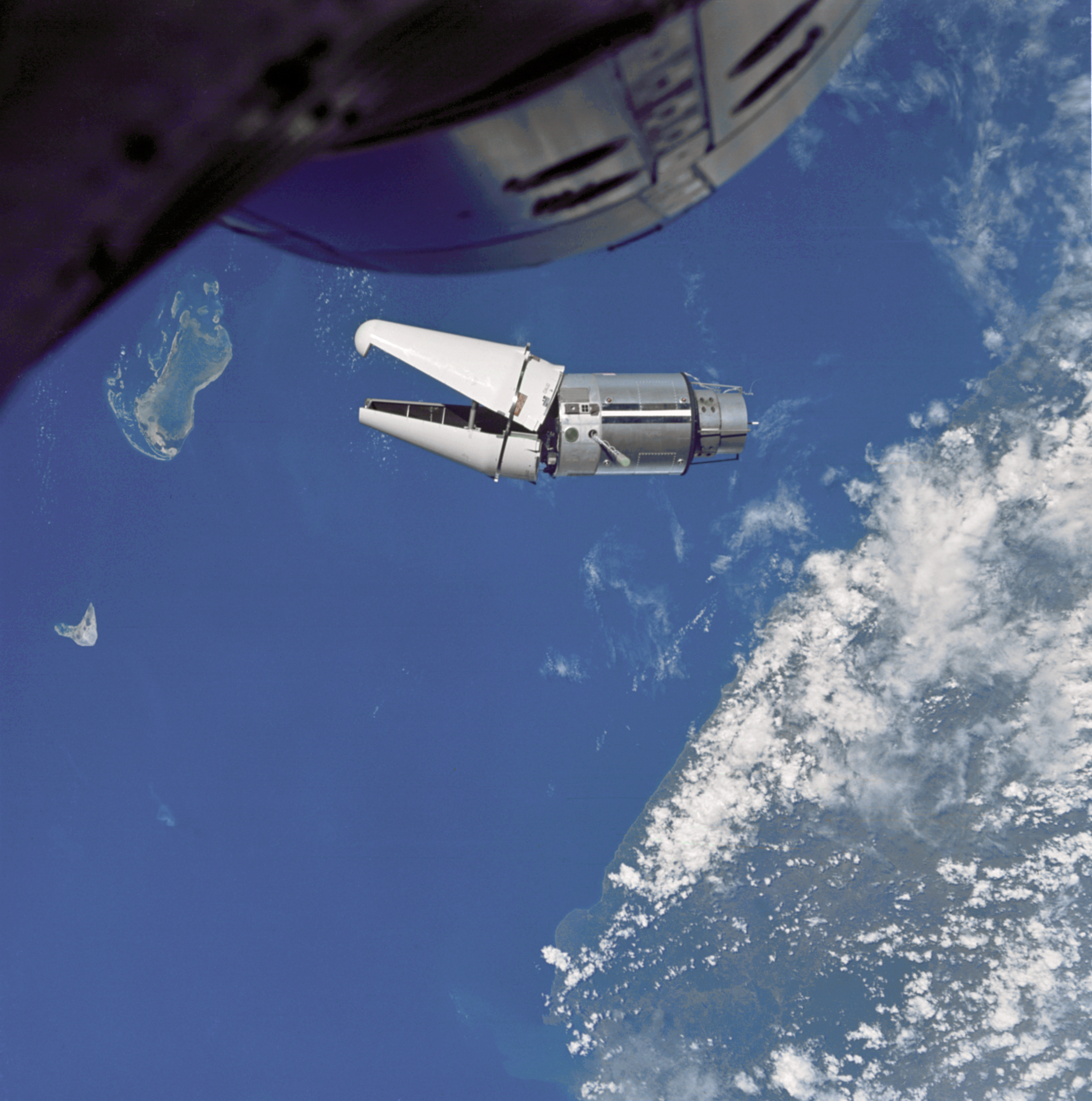
The ATDA in orbit as seen from Gemini 9A, above Caracas, Venezuela, the Venezuelan Coastal Range, Isla La Orchila, and the Los Roques Archipelago. The white parts are the partially-opened shroud. The photo is mirrored.

After the failure of the first GATV, NASA commissioned McDonnell to develop a backup docking target minus the Lockheed Agena rocket, the Augmented Target Docking Adapter (ATDA). This consisted of the Gemini docking collar and an attitude control propulsion system based on the Gemini Reentry Control System. The ATDA was 10.9 feet (3.3 m) long, with a mass of 1,750 pounds (794 kg). A few questions were raised about the compatibility of the ATDA with the Atlas booster, since it had much lower mass than the GATV, potentially throwing off the launch vehicle's aerodynamics and calibrated settings. However, Convair assured McDonnell that it would pose no technical issues with the booster.

A second GATV launch failure occurred on May 17, 1966, as Gemini 9 astronauts Tom Stafford and Eugene Cernan sat on their pad awaiting launch. The Atlas–Agena lifted smoothly into a cloudy sky, vanishing from view around T+50 seconds. Shortly before Booster Engine Cutoff (BECO), the guidance control officer announced that he had lost contact with the booster.

Telemetry indicated that Agena staging had taken place on schedule at T+300 seconds. The Agena continued transmitting signals until T+436 seconds, when all telemetry ceased. Hidden behind clouds, the Atlas's B-2 engine gimbaled hard to right starting at T+120 seconds and remained fixed in that position, flipping the launch vehicle 216° around and sending it back towards Cape Kennedy. This rotation had made it impossible for ground guidance to lock on. Radar stations in the Bahamas tracked it heading north and descending. Vehicle stability was gradually regained following BECO, however it had pitched approximately 231° from its intended flight path. Both vehicles plunged into the Atlantic Ocean 107 nautical miles (198 km) downrange. The Agena's engine did not activate since the proper altitude and velocity had not been attained, preventing the guidance system from sending the start command. While the exact cause of the engine gimbal control loss was not found, telemetry indicated that a short-to-ground occurred in the circuit for the servoamplifier output command signal, which may have been caused by cryogenic leakage in the thrust section. Substantiating this theory were abnormally low thrust section temperatures starting at T+65 seconds. The source of the cryogenic leakage was not identified. The loss of the lock on the ground prevented normal engine cutoff signals from being transmitted to the Atlas; BECO was generated by the staging backup accelerometer, SECO at T+273 seconds due to LOX depletion, and VECO and Agena staging from a backup command generated by the missile programmer. Aside from the flight control system, all Atlas systems functioned properly.

While Convair accepted responsibility for the launch failure, Lockheed engineers expressed concern about telemetry data that indicated a servo failure in the Agena, leading to doubts as to whether the stage would have still operated properly if the Atlas hadn't malfunctioned. However, the true cause of failure surfaced when the Air Force released film taken by tracking cameras at Melbourne Beach, Florida, which showed the Atlas pitching over and heading downward. It was then determined that the Agena's servo malfunction was caused by passing through the Atlas's ionized exhaust trail.

The Gemini 9A modified mission launch was rescheduled for June 1, 1966, using the ATDA. However, the shroud that protected the docking adapter during launch failed to separate, due to lanyards being incorrectly secured with adhesive tape. Gemini 9A was launched on June 3, and when in orbit, the crew observed that the shroud of the ATDA had partially opened and was described by Stafford as "looking like an angry alligator". Docking was not possible, but the rendezvous maneuver was practiced instead.

== Flight statistics ==
Target	Gemini mission	Launched	Reentered	NSSDC ID	Gross mass in orbit	Comments	Photo
GATV-5002	Gemini 6	October 25, 1965; 15:00:04 UTC	October 25, 1965; 15:06:20 UTC	GEM6T	N/A	Atlas-Agena exploded during launch. Gemini 6A achieved first rendezvous with Gemini 7 instead.	
GATV-5003	Gemini 8	March 16, 1966; 15:00:03 UTC	September 15, 1967	1966-019A	7,117 pounds (3,228 kg)	Achieved first docking, but mission soon aborted due to stuck Gemini thruster. ATV later used as secondary target on Gemini 10.	
GATV-5004	Gemini 9	May 17, 1966; 15:12:00 UTC	May 17, 1966; 15:19:00 UTC	GEM9TA	N/A	Failed to orbit.	
ATDA No. 02186	Gemini 9A	June 1, 1966; 15:00:02 UTC	June 11, 1966	1966-046A	1,750 pounds (794 kg)	No Agena rocket. Successful rendezvous, but no docking due to shroud separation failure.	
GATV-5005	Gemini 10	July 18, 1966; 20:39:46 UTC	December 29, 1966	1966-065A	7,236 pounds (3,282 kg)	Boosted Gemini 10 to 412-nautical-mile (763 km) apogee.	
GATV-5006	Gemini 11	September 12, 1966; 13:05:01 UTC	December 30, 1966	1966-080A	7,271 pounds (3,298 kg)	Boosted Gemini 11 to record 739.2-nautical-mile (1,369.0 km) apogee. First demonstration of artificial gravity created in microgravity.	
GATV-5001A	Gemini 12	November 11, 1966; 19:07:58 UTC	December 23, 1966	1966-103A	7,117 pounds (3,228 kg)	No apogee boost due to defective Agena engine. Performed tether experiment.	

== In popular culture ==
Gemini 8's docking with the Agena was shown in episode 1 "Can We Do This?", of the 1998 HBO miniseries From the Earth to the Moon, and in the 2018 Neil Armstrong biopic First Man.

Gemini 8's docking with the Agena featured in the short science fiction drama DARKSIDE produced by nrgpix as an entry to the London Sci Fi film festival 2020.
