= Gemini 11 =

1966 NASA crewed spaceflight

Gemini XI
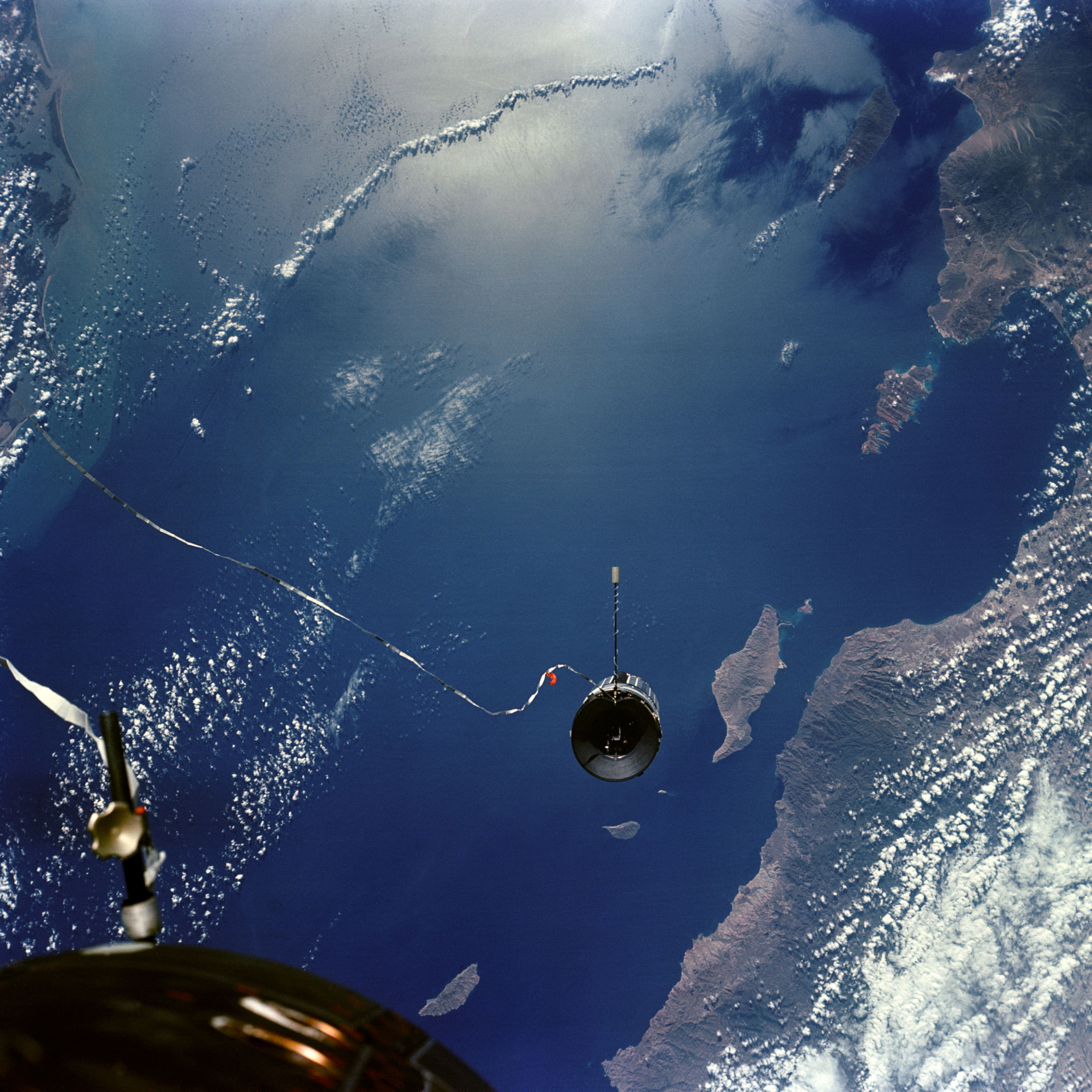
- Gemini XI conducting a tether experiment using the Agena Target Vehicle
- Mission type: Space rendezvous; Spacecraft docking; Extravehicular activity
- Operator: NASA
- COSPAR ID: 1966-081A
- SATCAT no.: 02415
- Mission duration: 2 days, 23 hours, 17 minutes and 9 seconds
- Orbits completed: 44

Spacecraft properties
- Spacecraft: Gemini SC11
- Manufacturer: McDonnell Aircraft
- Launch mass: 3,798 kg (8,374 lb)
- Landing mass: 1,920 kg (4,230 lb)

Crew
- Crew size: 2
- Members: Charles "Pete" Conrad Jr.; Richard F. Gordon Jr.
- EVAs: 2
- EVA duration: 2 hours and 41 minutes

Start of mission
- Launch date: September 12, 1966, 14:42:26 UTC (9:42:26 am EST)
- Rocket: Titan II GLV
- Launch site: Cape Kennedy, LC-19

End of mission
- Recovered by: USS Guam
- Landing date: September 15, 1966, 13:59:35 UTC
- Landing site: Atlantic Ocean (24°15′N 70°0′W)

Orbital parameters
- Reference system: Geocentric orbit
- Regime: Low Earth orbit
- Perigee altitude: 298 km (185 mi; 161 nmi)
- Apogee altitude: 1,374 km (854 mi; 742 nmi)
- Inclination: 28.8°
- Period: 101.57 minutes
- Epoch: September 14, 1966

Docking with GATV-5006
- Docking date: September 12, 1966, 16:16:00 UTC
- Undocking date: September 14, 1966, 16:55:00 UTC
- Time docked: 2 days and 39 minutes
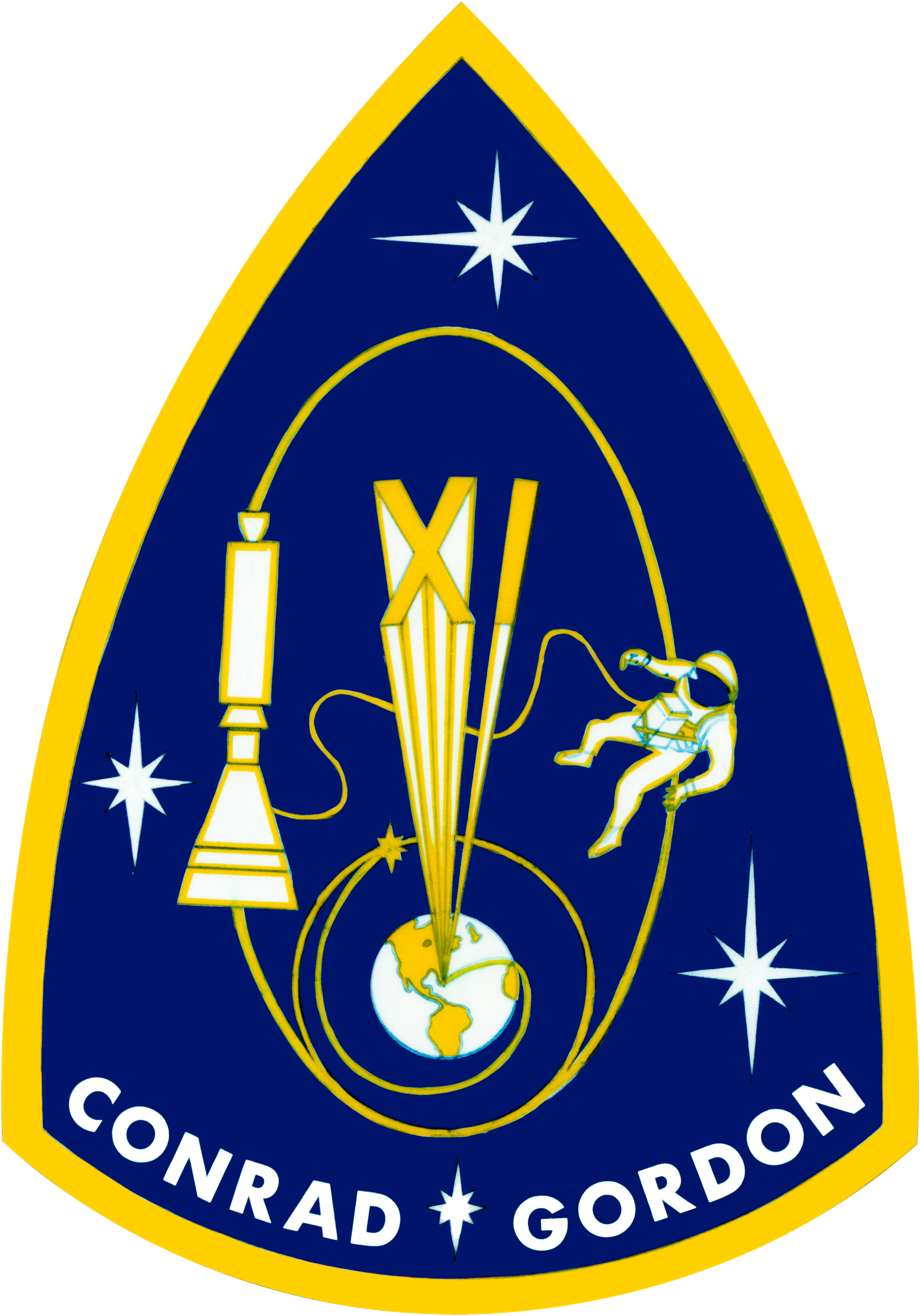
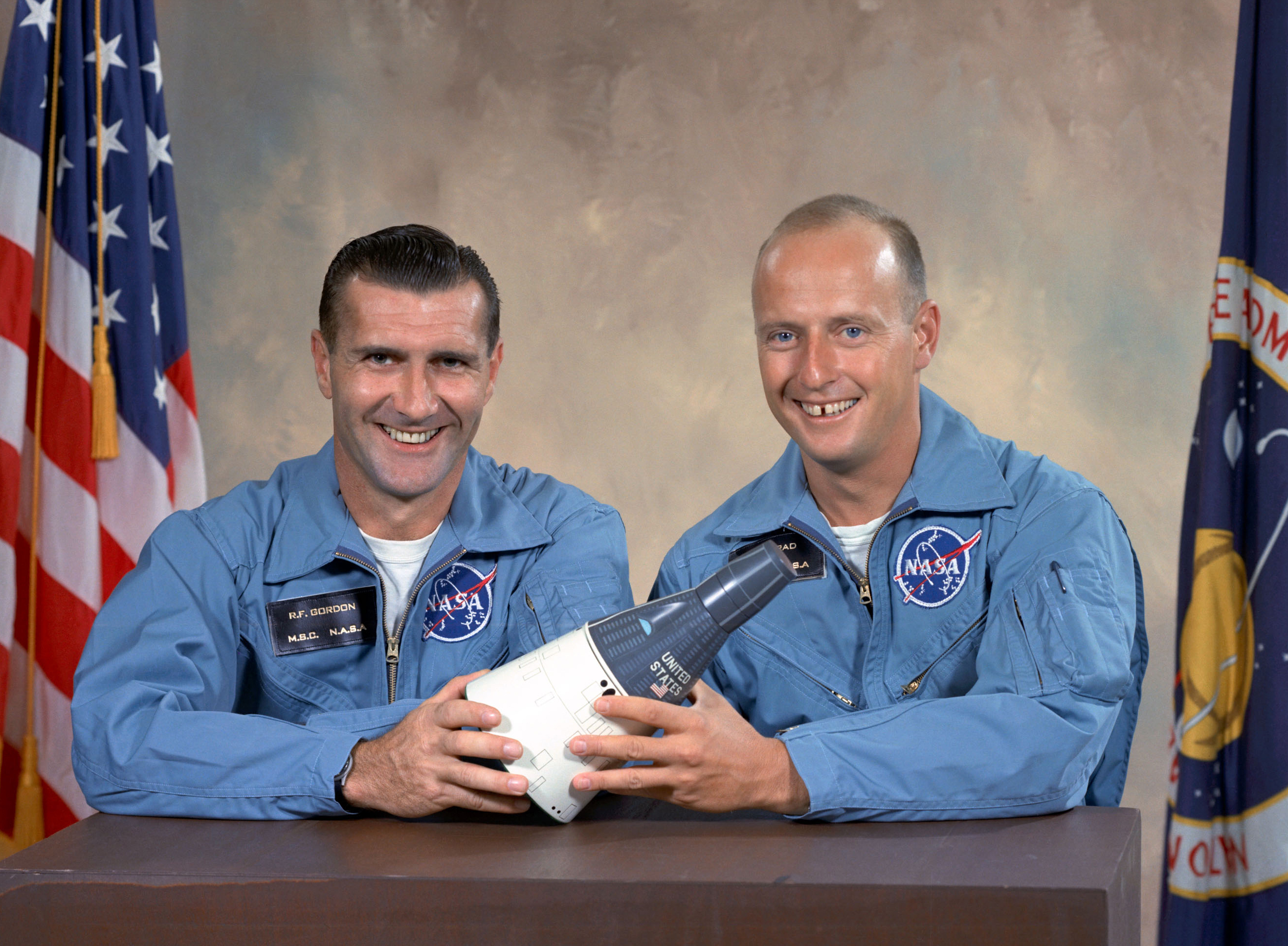
- Mission patch Gordon and Conrad Project Gemini

Gemini 11 (officially Gemini XI) was the ninth crewed spaceflight mission of NASA's Project Gemini, which flew from September 12 to 15, 1966. It was the 17th crewed American flight and the 25th spaceflight to that time (includes X-15 flights over 100 kilometers (62 mi; 54 nmi)). Astronauts Pete Conrad and Dick Gordon performed the first direct-ascent (first orbit) rendezvous with an Agena Target Vehicle, docking with it 1 hour 34 minutes after launch; used the Agena rocket engine to achieve a record high-apogee Earth orbit; and created a small amount of artificial gravity by spinning the two spacecraft connected by a tether. Gordon also performed two extra-vehicular activities for a total of 2 hours 41 minutes.

== Crew ==
Position	Astronaut
Command Pilot	Charles "Pete" Conrad Jr. Second spaceflight
Pilot	Richard F. Gordon Jr. First spaceflight

=== Backup crew ===
Position	Astronaut
Command Pilot	Neil A. Armstrong
Pilot	William A. Anders

=== Support crew ===
- Clifton C. Williams Jr. (Cape CAPCOM)
- John W. Young (Houston CAPCOM)
- Alan L. Bean (Houston CAPCOM)

== Mission parameters ==
- Mass: 3,798 kilograms (8,374 lb)

Highest orbit (followed twice):

- Perigee: 298 kilometers (185 mi; 161 nmi)
- Apogee: 1,374 kilometers (854 mi; 742 nmi)
- Inclination: 28.85°
- Period: 101.52 min

=== Docking ===
- Docked: September 12, 1966, 16:16:00 UTC
- Undocked: September 14, 1966, 16:55:00 UTC

=== Space walk ===
- Gordon – EVA 1
  - Start: September 13, 1966, 14:44:00 UTC
  - End: September 13, 1966, 15:17:00 UTC
  - Duration: 33 minutes
- Gordon – EVA 2 (stand up)
  - Start: September 14, 1966, 12:49:00 UTC
  - End: September 14, 1966, 14:57:00 UTC
  - Duration: 2 hours and 8 minutes

== Objectives ==
- Perform a direct-ascent rendezvous with the Agena Target Vehicle on the first orbit in support of Project Apollo. This would simulate a Lunar Module rendezvous with the Command/Service Module after a lunar landing.
- Use the Agena rocket engine to put the combined craft in a high-apogee elliptical orbit.
- Perform two extra-vehicular activities.
- Demonstrate passive attitude stabilization of the two spacecraft connected by a tether and create artificial gravity by spinning the combined craft.
- Perform miscellaneous scientific experiments.
- Perform a computer-controlled atmospheric reentry to a precision splashdown point.

Gemini 11	Agena info
Agena	GATV-5006
NSSDC ID:	1966-080A
Mass	7,000 pounds (3,200 kg)
Launch site	LC-14
Launch date	September 12, 1966
Launch time	13:05:01 UTC
1st perigee	156.4 nautical miles (289.7 km)
1st apogee	165.8 nautical miles (307.1 km)
Period	90.56 min
Inclination	28.84 deg
Reentered	September 15, 1966

== Flight ==
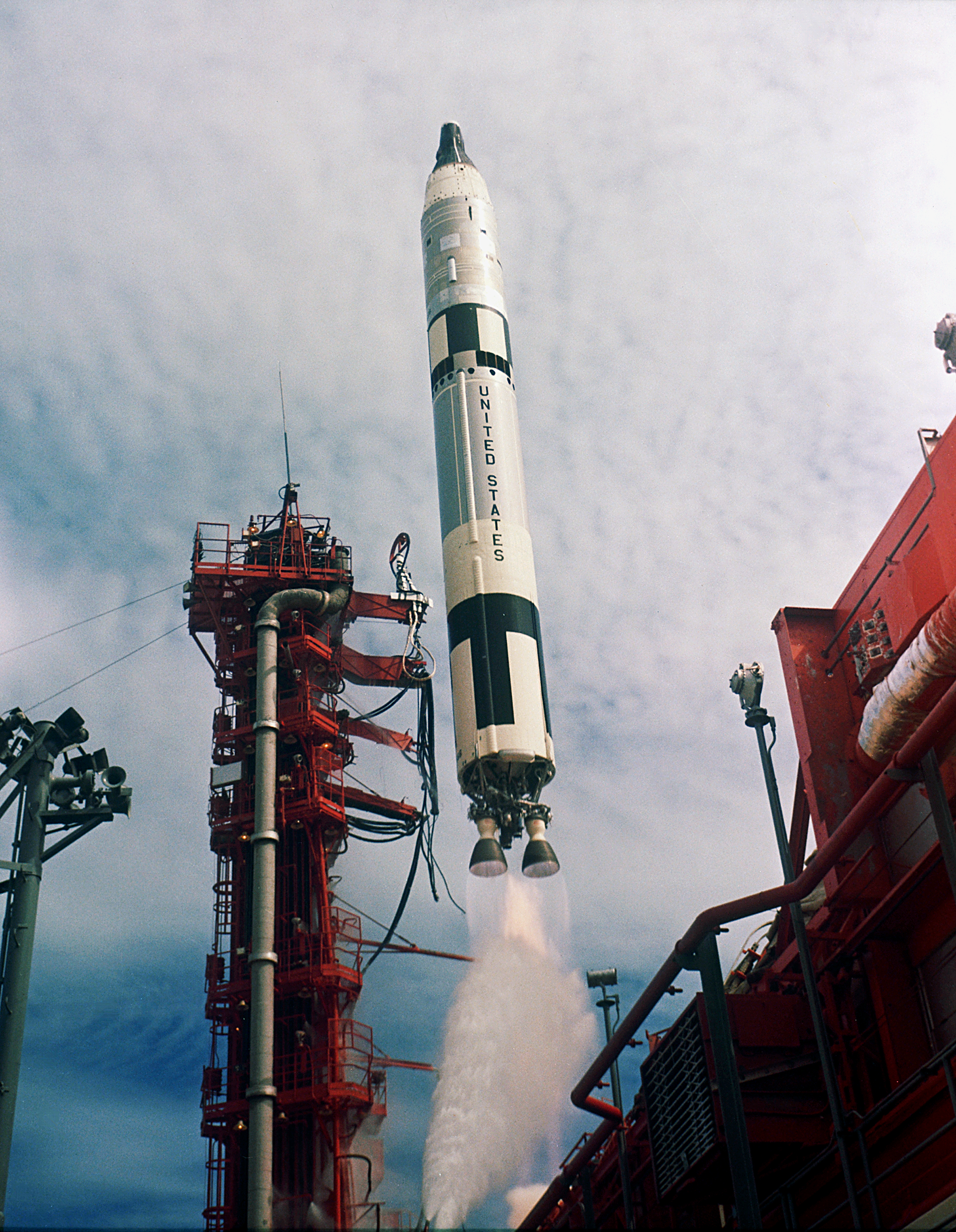
Gemini 11 spacecraft launches on Titan II GLV rocket

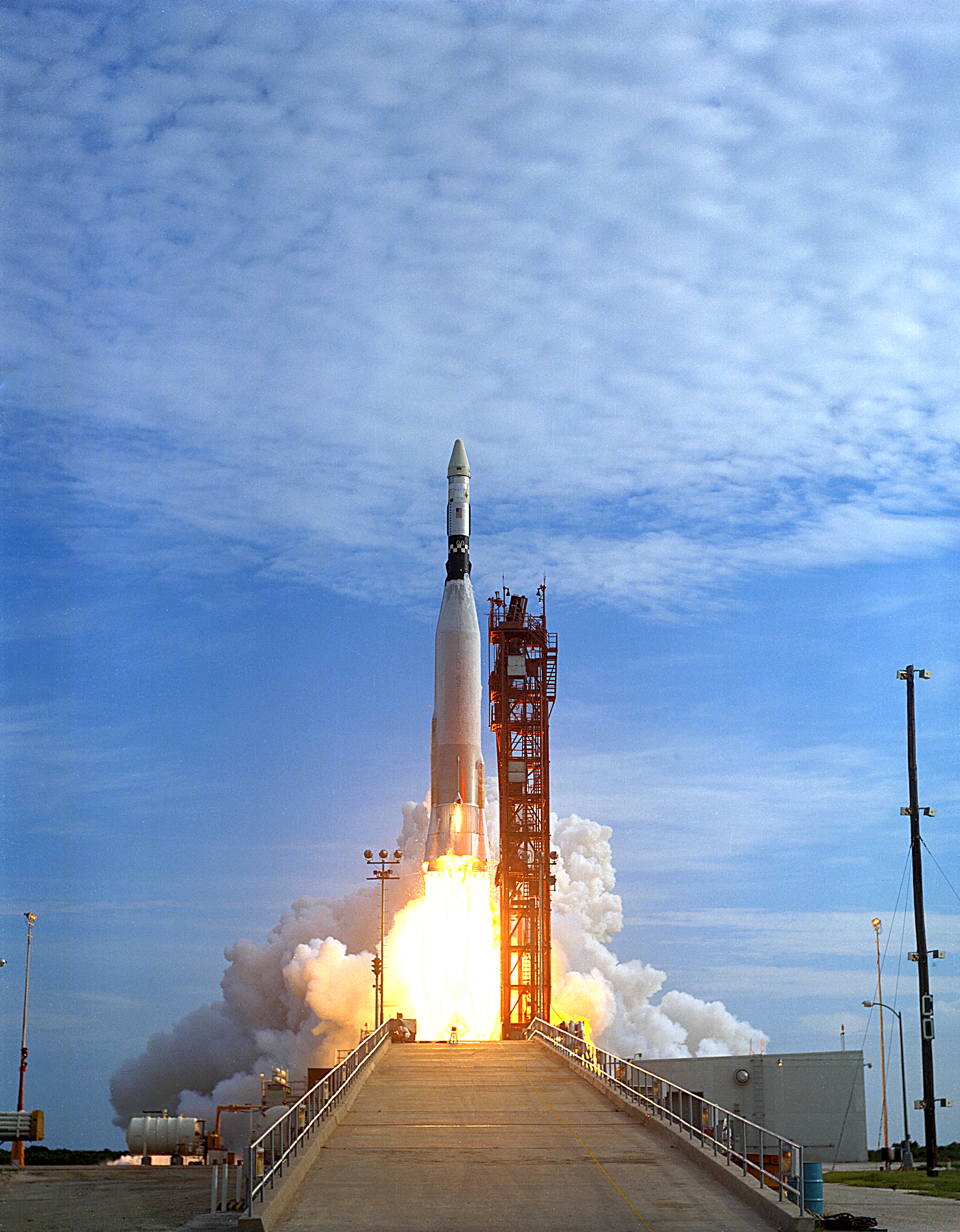
Atlas rocket launches Agena target vehicle for the Gemini 11 mission

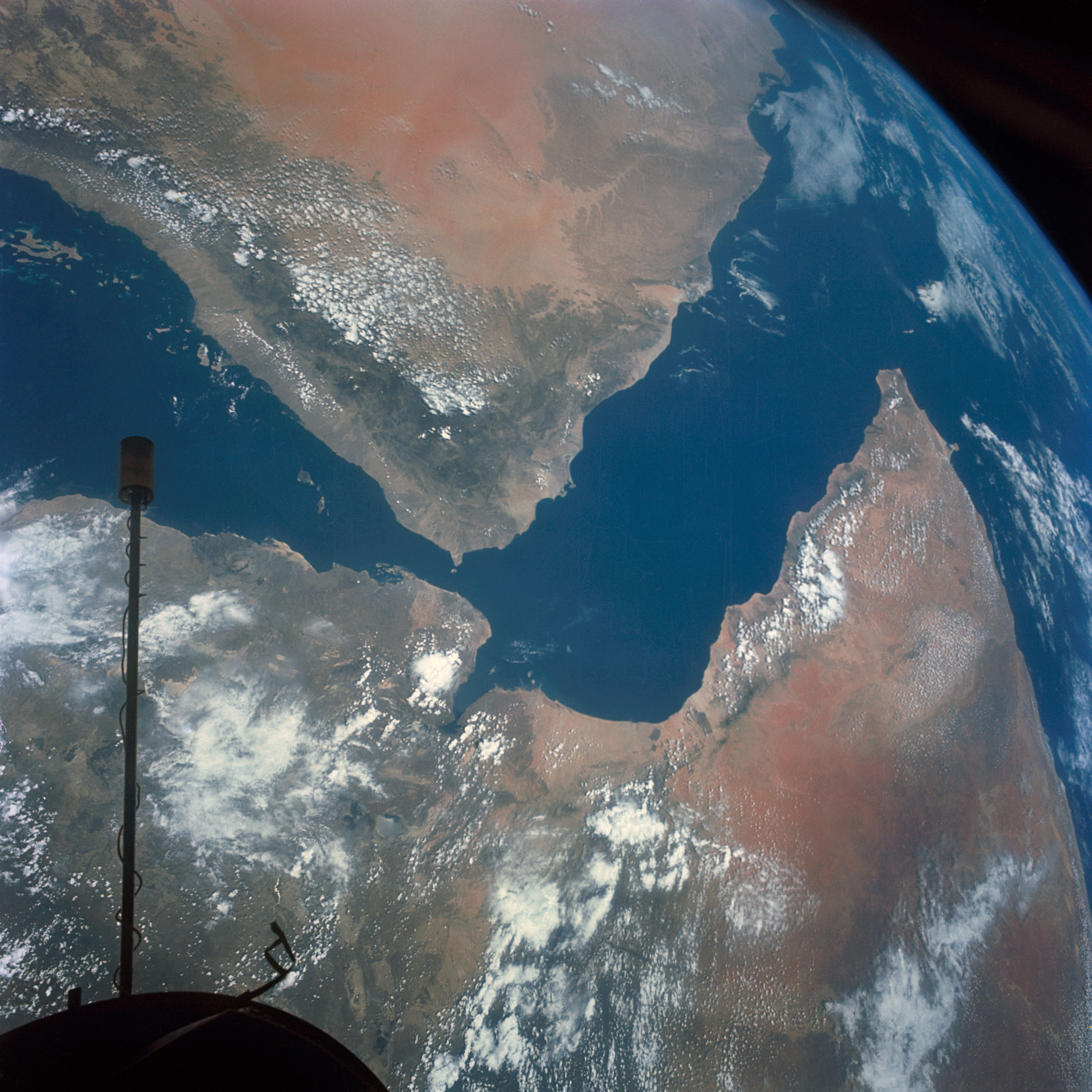
Arabian Peninsula (top left) and East Africa (bottom) as seen from the orbiting Gemini 11 spacecraft at an altitude of 340 nautical miles during its 27th revolution around Earth. (Taken with a modified 70 mm Hasselblad camera.)

The direct-ascent rendezvous and docking with the Agena vehicle was achieved approximately 94 minutes after lift-off, depending on the on-board computer and radar equipment with only minimal assistance from ground support.

Gemini 11 used the rocket on its Agena target vehicle to raise its apogee to 853 miles (1,373 km), the highest Earth orbit ever reached by a crewed spacecraft at the time. The perigee was 179 miles (288 km), and maximum velocity (at perigee) was 17,967 miles per hour (28,915 km/h). The apogee record stood until Polaris Dawn in 2024; humans have achieved greater distances from Earth by flying to the Moon. (Note: If Apollo had progressed as planned, the record would have been broken by the E mission, a medium Earth orbital test of the complete Apollo spacecraft, with an apogee of 3,500 nautical miles (6,500 km) planned to be flown in March 1969. But the first Lunar Module was not ready in time for the D mission planned for December 1968, which was a low Earth orbit test (see List of Apollo missions). Therefore, the E mission was cancelled and replaced with the D mission in March, and Gemini 11's apogee record stood.) The maximum operational altitude of the Space Shuttle was much lower, at 386 miles (621 km) for the STS-31 flight in 1990. The September 2021 SpaceX flight of Inspiration4, while having an apogee higher than most Space Shuttle flights, only reached 585 kilometers (364 mi).

The crew docked and undocked four times and still had sufficient Gemini maneuvering fuel for an unplanned fifth rendezvous. They did not remain in the high orbit, but changed it back to a near-circular one at 184 miles (296 km).

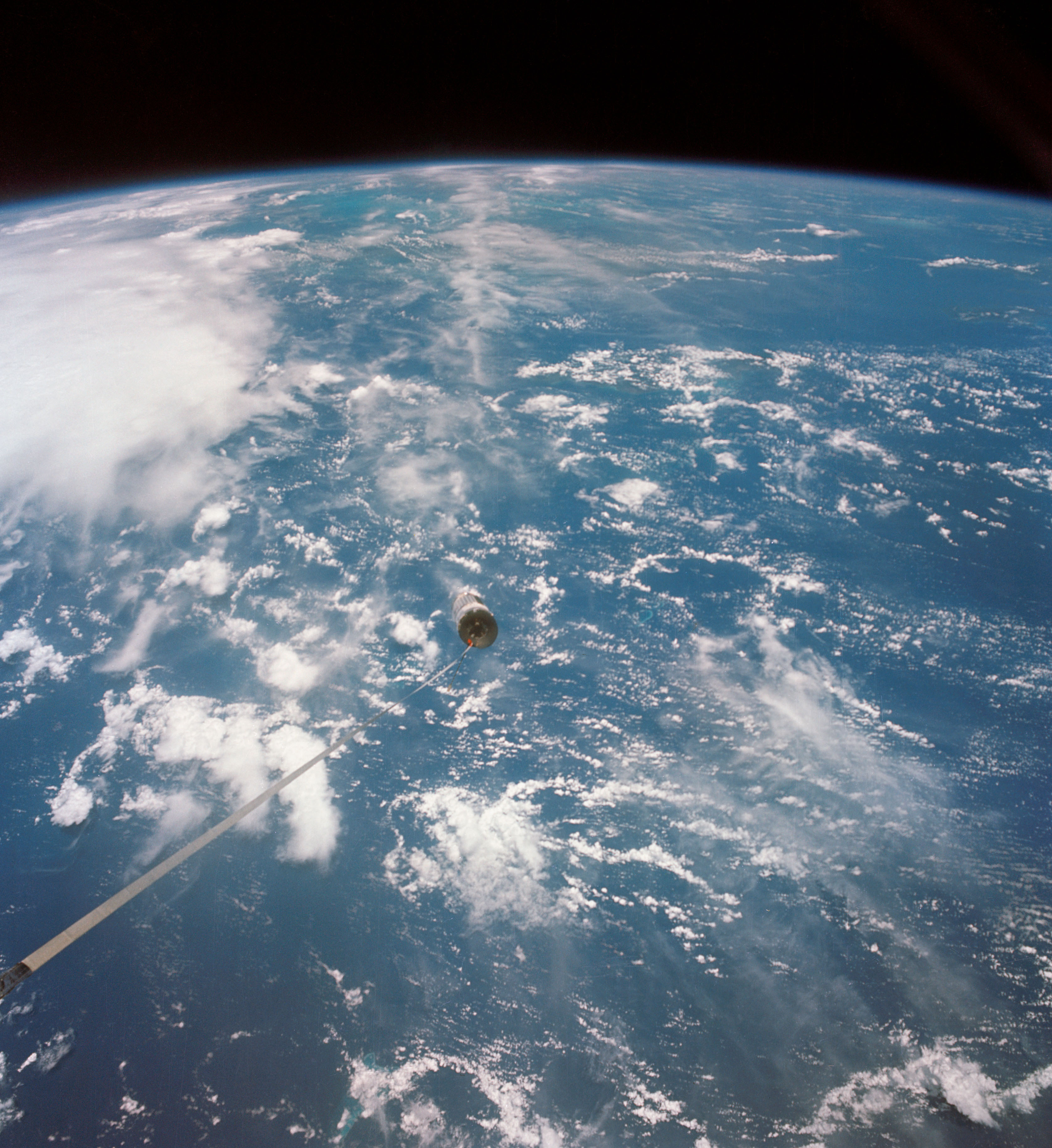
A 100-foot tether line connects the Agena Target Docking Vehicle with the Gemini-11 spacecraft during its 32nd revolution of Earth in September 1966. Rotating the two craft created a small amount of gravity via centrifugal force.

Gordon's first EVA, planned to last for two hours, involved fastening a 100-foot (30 m) tether, stored in the Agena's docking collar, to the Gemini's docking bar for the passive stabilization experiment. Gordon achieved this, but as with previous Gemini EVAs, trying to work for an extended period proved more fatiguing than in ground simulation, and the EVA had to be terminated after only half an hour.

The passive stabilization experiment proved to be troublesome. Conrad and Gordon separated the craft in a nose-down (i.e., Agena-down) position, but found that the tether would not be kept taut simply by the Earth's gravity gradient, as expected. They were able to generate a small amount of artificial gravity, about 0.00015 g, by firing their side thrusters to slowly rotate the combined craft like a slow-motion pair of bolas.

Gordon successfully performed a second EVA standing up with his head and shoulders out of the hatch to photograph the Earth, clouds, and stars. This was not tiring and lasted more than two hours.

=== Scientific experiments ===
The 12 scientific experiments were:

- Mass Determination: To test a technique and accuracy of a direct-contact method of determining the mass of an orbiting object, in this case the Agena Target Vehicle.
- Night Image Intensification: To test the usefulness and performance of a low-light-level television system as a supplement to unaided vision in observing surface features primarily when such features are in darkness and spacecraft pilots are not dark-adapted.
- Power Tool Evaluation: To evaluate man's capability to perform work tasks in space, including the comparison of ability to work tethered and untethered, and to evaluate the performance of the minimum-reaction power tool.
- Radiation and Zero G Effects on Blood and Neurospora: To determine whether weightlessness enhances the effects of radiation on human white blood cells and Neurospora crassa fungi.
- Synoptic Terrain Photography: To obtain high-quality photographs for research in geology, geophysics, geography, oceanography, and related fields.
- Synoptic Weather Photography: To obtain selective high-quality photographs of clouds to study the fine structure of the Earth's weather system.
- Nuclear Emulsion: To study the cosmic radiation incident on the Earth's atmosphere, to obtain detailed chemical composition of the heavy primary nuclei, and to search for rare particles.
- Airglow Horizon Photography: To measure by direct photography the heights at which atomic oxygen and sodium layers occur in the upper atmosphere.
- Ultraviolet Astronomical Camera: To test the techniques of ultraviolet photography under vacuum conditions and to obtain ultraviolet radiation observations of stars in wavelength region of 2,000 to 4,000 angstroms by spectral means.
- Ion Wake Measurement: To determine and measure the ion and electron wake structure and perturbation of the ambient medium produced by an orbiting vehicle, and to study the changes in the ion flux and wake caused by thruster firings.
- Earth-Moon Libration Region Photography: To investigate the regions of the L4 and L5 libration points of the Earth–Moon system to determine the possible existence of clouds of particulate matter orbiting the Earth in these regions (Kordylewski clouds).
- Dim-Light Photography and Orthicon: To obtain photographs of various faint and diffuse astronomical phenomena.

=== Reentry ===
The mission ended with the first totally automatic, computer-controlled reentry by the U.S., which brought Gemini 11 down 2.8 miles (4.5 km) from its recovery ship USS Guam, only 1.5 miles (2.4 km) from the planned position.

Astronaut recovery was done by United States Navy Helicopter Anti-Submarine Squadron 3.

The Gemini 11 mission was supported by 9,054 United States Department of Defense personnel, 73 aircraft, and 13 ships.

== Insignia ==
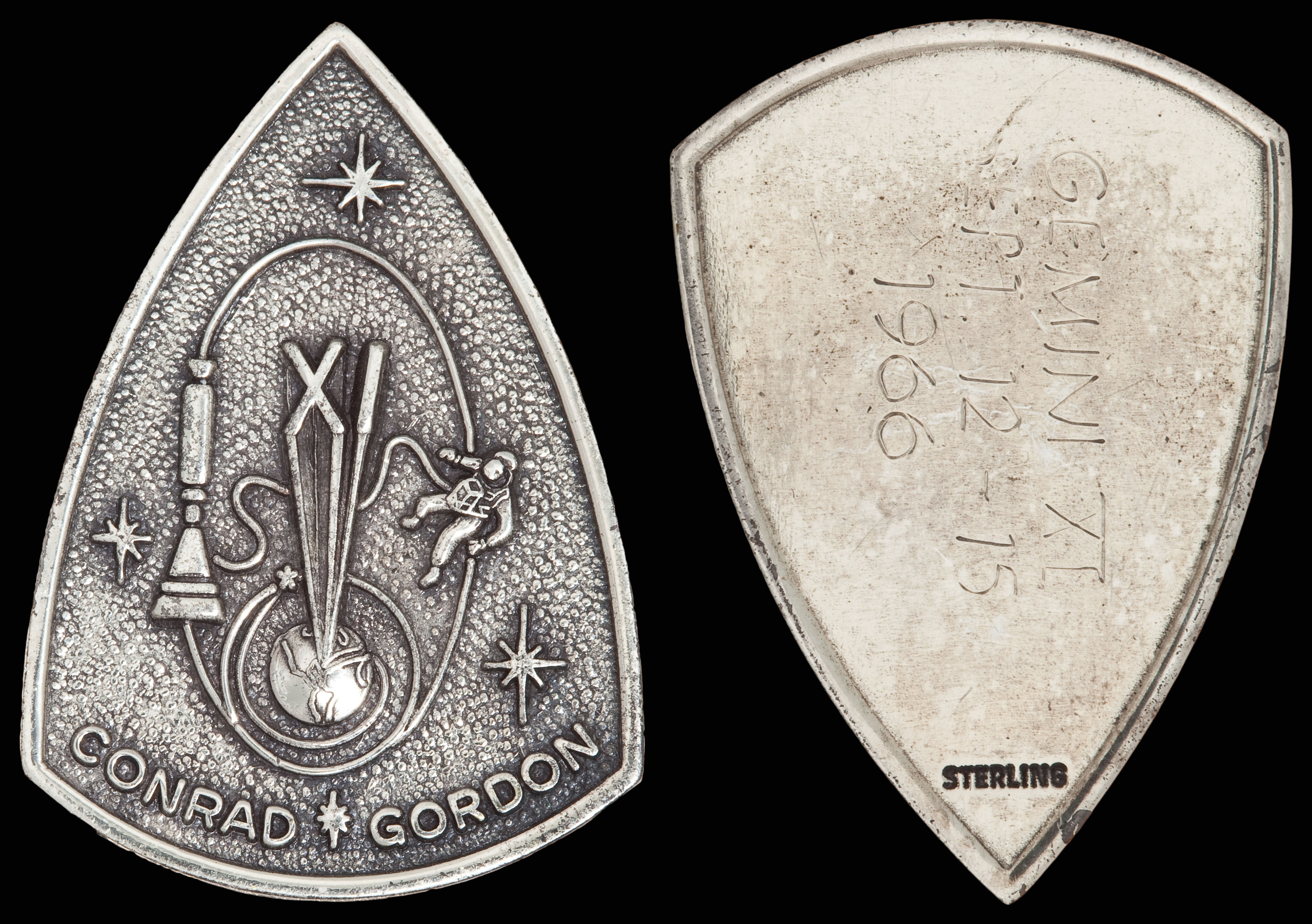
Gemini 11 space-flown Fliteline Medallion

Since Conrad and Gordon were both members of the US Navy, the embroidered mission patch was designed in Navy colors: blue and gold. Stars are used to mark the major milestones of the mission. The first orbit Agena rendezvous is marked by a small gold star just above the Earth, to the left. The Agena docking is marked by a large star on the left. The star at the top marks the record high apogee reached by Gemini 11. Note that the scale is greatly exaggerated; their maximum altitude of 850 miles (1,370 km) is roughly the distance from St. Louis to Cape Kennedy. Finally, the star on the right marks Dick Gordon's spacewalk. The docking, record apogee and spacewalk are also shown on the patch by the Agena, orbital apogee path and spacewalking astronaut.

== Potential lunar missions ==
Gemini 11's record altitude was ultimately the result of an internal race to the Moon. As early as 1961, NASA's Jim Chamberlin and McDonnell Aircraft had advocated using Gemini spacecraft to get to the Moon sooner than Apollo. Their proposals considered using Centaur rockets to boost the Gemini on a circumlunar trajectory (similar to the Soviet's Zond program), lunar orbit missions using Centaur rockets for translunar injection and Agena for lunar orbit insertion, and even lunar landing missions using Gemini in place of the Apollo Command Module and a small open-cockpit Langley Light LM in place of the Apollo Lunar Module. Multiple Titan or Saturn IB rockets, and even the abandoned Saturn C-3 were considered as the launch vehicles.

Pete Conrad liked these ideas and together with McDonnell corporations strongly advocated his Gemini 11 to be circumlunar. Discretely called 'Gemini – Large Earth Orbit', the plan would use a Titan IIIC-launched Transtage. The Gemini 11 crew would be launched with the Titan II GLV as they did in reality, and would dock with the Transtage, which would then boost them to translunar velocity. Conrad managed to stir Congressional interest, but NASA administrator James Webb informed them that any extra funds Congress cared to appropriate for such a project would be better spent accelerating the Apollo program. After further internal struggles, Conrad finally got NASA approval for the Agena on his Gemini 11 flight to boost him onto two record highly elliptical 1,370 km orbits. This high flight was the only remnant of lunar Gemini.

== Spacecraft location ==
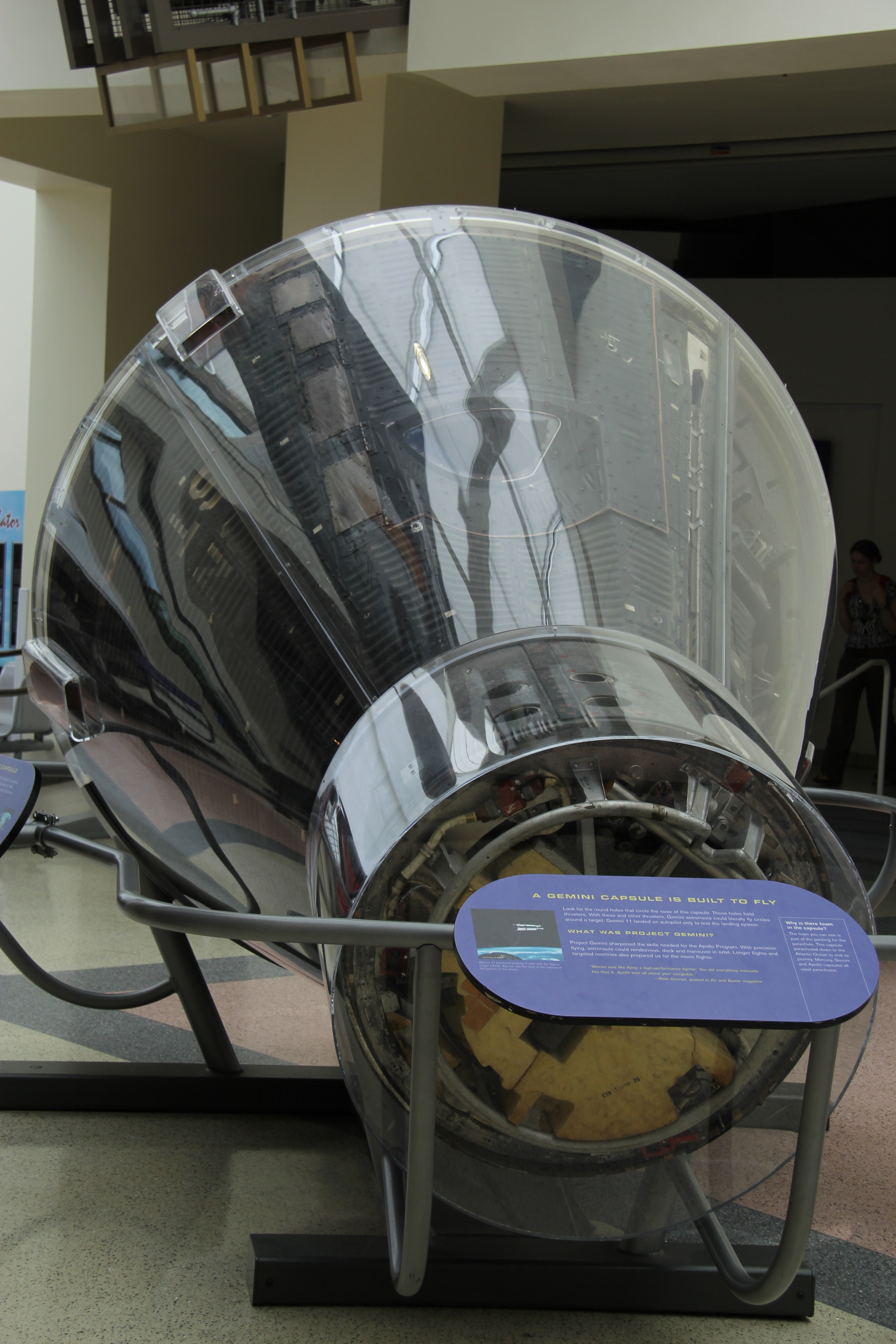
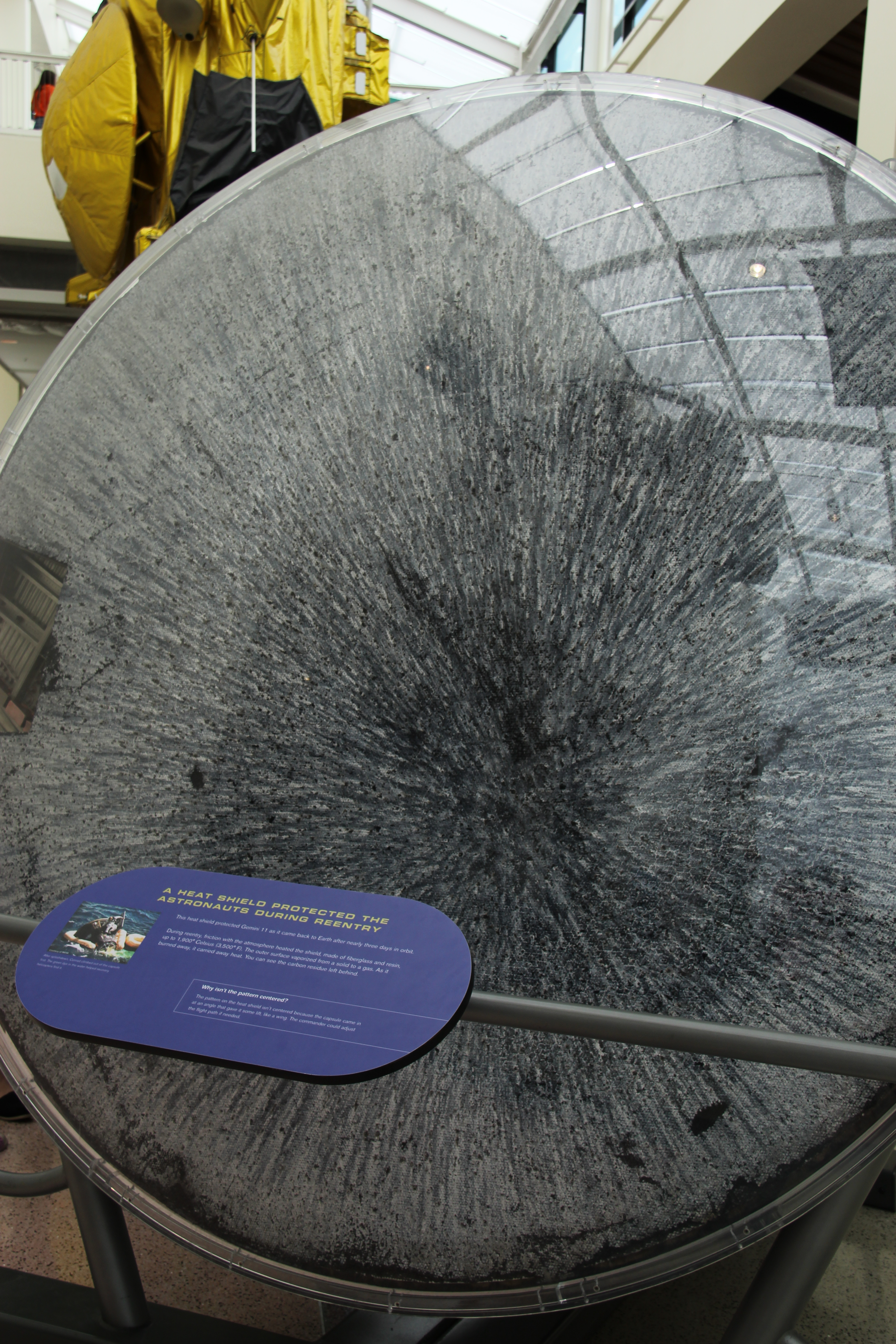
The Gemini 11 capsule on display at the California Science Center in Los Angeles

The spacecraft is on display at the California Science Center in Los Angeles, California.

== See also ==
- List of spacewalks and moonwalks 1965-1999

== Notes ==
Preceded by Gemini 10 crew	Human altitude record 1966-1968	Succeeded by Apollo 8 crew
