= Neutral Buoyancy Simulator =

Historic astronaut training facility

- U.S. National Register of Historic Places
- U.S. National Historic Landmark
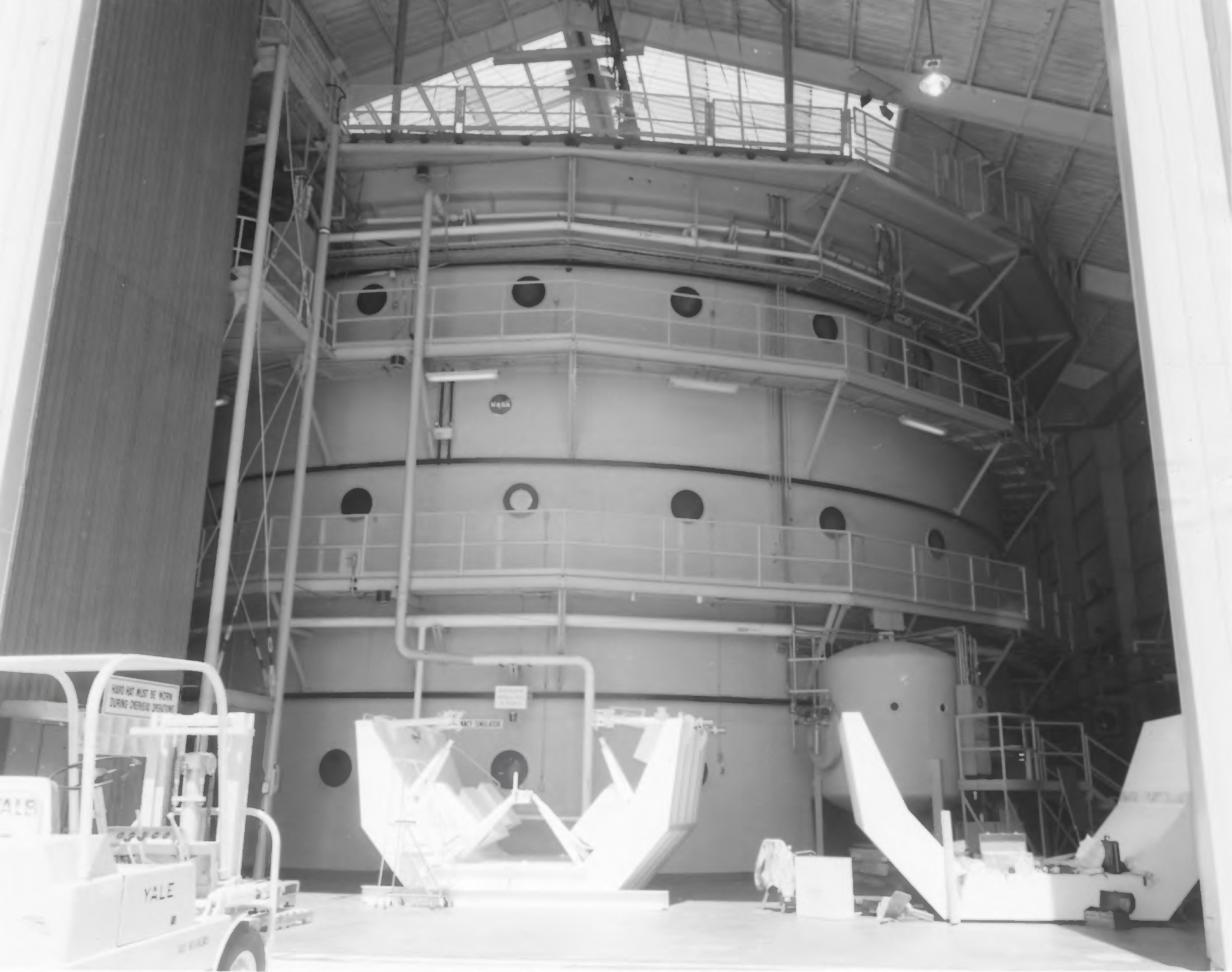

- Location within Huntsville, Alabama Location within Alabama Location within the United States
- Location: Huntsville, Alabama
- Coordinates: 34°39′11″N 86°40′39″W
- Built: 1968
- Architect: NASA
- NRHP reference No.: 85002807

Significant dates
- Added to NRHP: October 3, 1985
- Designated NHL: October 3, 1985

The Neutral Buoyancy Simulator was a neutral buoyancy pool located at NASA's George C. Marshall Space Flight Center (MSFC). The simulator was used from 1968 through its decommissioning in 1997. Marshall recognized the need for underwater simulations of extra-vehicular activities (EVAs) and developed three successively larger tanks for the purpose. The Neutral Buoyancy Simulator contributed significantly to the American crewed space program. Astronauts involved into Skylab, the Space Shuttle, Hubble Space Telescope, and the International Space Station missions trained in the facility. Until Johnson Space Center constructed the Weightless Environment Test Facility in the mid-1970s, MSFC had the only NASA-owned test facility that allowed engineers and astronauts to become familiar with the dynamics of body motion under weightless conditions.

The water within the simulator was temperature controlled, continuously recirculated and filtered. Special systems were integrated into the tank for underwater audio and video, pressure-suit environmental control and emergency rescue and treatment. Life support was simultaneously provided by these systems for up to four pressure-suited subjects. Additional systems included data acquisition and recording, underwater lighting, special underwater pneumatic and electrical power operations of motor, valves, controls, and indicators that required for high fidelity and functional engineering mockups and trainers.

Demolition of the Neutral Buoyancy Simulator began in mid-December 2025.

== Principles of operation ==
Neutral buoyancy simulates the weightless environment of space. First equipment is lowered into the pool using an overhead crane. Suited astronauts then get in the tank and support divers add weight to the astronauts so that they experience no buoyant force and no rotational moment about their center of mass.

One downside of using neutral buoyancy to simulate microgravity is the significant amount of drag presented by water. Generally, drag effects are minimized by doing tasks slowly in the water. Another downside of neutral buoyancy simulation is that astronauts are not weightless within their suits, thus, precise suit sizing is critical.

== Origins and first tank ==
NASA has flown zero-g flights on various aircraft for many years. In 1959, Project Mercury astronauts trained in a C-131 Samaritan aircraft, which was dubbed the "Vomit Comet". Airplane weightlessness is limited to 25 seconds at a time, which hampers efforts to practice EVAs which might last hours.

Prior to May 1960, NASA recognized the possibility of underwater neutral buoyancy simulations and began testing its efficacy. NASA engaged Environmental Research Associates of Baltimore to try neutral buoyancy simulations first in a pool near Langley Research Center. Visitors and other issues disturbed those efforts, and they moved the operation to McDonogh School where Scott Carpenter was the first astronaut to participate suited. Then, after difficult EVAs through Gemini 11 in mid-September 1966, the Manned Spacecraft Center fully understood the importance of testing procedures underwater and sent the Gemini 12 crew to train at McDonogh.

Meanwhile, MSFC was looking ahead to the Apollo Applications Program which would involve EVAs to convert a mostly-empty S-IVB rocket stage into a space station, and the people designing the hardware needed a thorough understanding of the challenges of weightlessness. Charlie Cooper at MSFC theorized that neutral buoyancy exercises could help with EVA planning while he was reviewing film of the Gemini 4 EVA. He and Charles D. Stocks pursued the idea with a couple of NASA scuba suits and an 8 feet (2.4 m) diameter, 8 feet (2.4 m) deep pool which had been previously used for forming metal parts explosively. November 1965 tests included removal of the ST-124 and a J-2 engine propellant utilization valve - early steps in a nascent Skylab mission, then called S-IVB orbital workshop.

== Second tank ==
After the utility of the technique had been demonstrated, in January 1966, workers repurposed a larger explosive forming tank for neutral buoyancy testing. The larger pool was 25 feet (7.6 m) diameter, 15 feet (4.6 m) deep. A 10 feet (3.0 m) tall 35 feet (11 m) diameter damaged Saturn V corrugated section with a conical roof atop enclosed the now-heated facility with adequate lighting and more room for larger hardware than the initial tank.

The budget for the second tank was especially tight. It included a swimming pool filter from Sears and a tap into an adjacent steam line for water heat. Algae engaged chemists for nearly a year to find an appropriate balance of chemicals for the unique arrangement.

Initial tests again focused on S-IVB workshop: airlock ingress and egress, and S-IVB hatch cover removal.

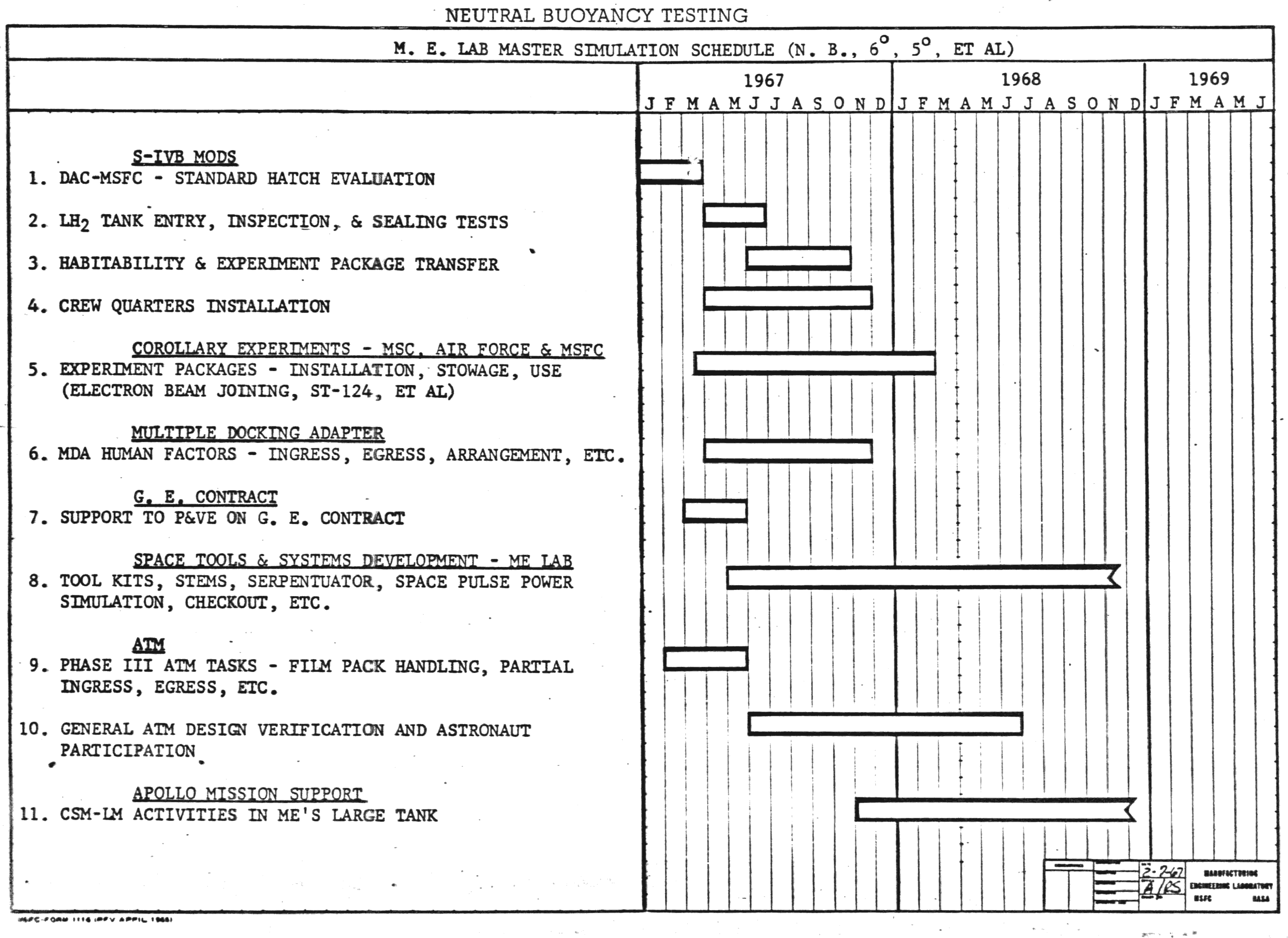
The Manufacturing Engineering schedule showed heavy activity from early 1967 through more than the next year.

The second tank saw astronaut training in pressure suits beginning with the Navy Mark IV. The MSFC Manufacturing Engineering (ME) lab developed a constant pressure valve which "made it possible to maintain neutral buoyancy at any depth." Divers first tried the Mark IV in the tank in July 1966, and Alan Bean spent two hours "executing typical astronaut activities" in the tank on September 6, 1966. Bean was "quite enthusiastic and outspoken about neutral buoyancy as one of the mandatory methods of simulation for all the S-IVB Workshop experiments," according to Manufacturing Engineering director W. R. Kuers. Stocks, the controller for that exercise, reported Bean's dive began with a leaky glove followed by his Mark IV suit tearing under the arm and requiring diver-assisted evacuation. Bean proceeded with exercises in regular scuba gear.

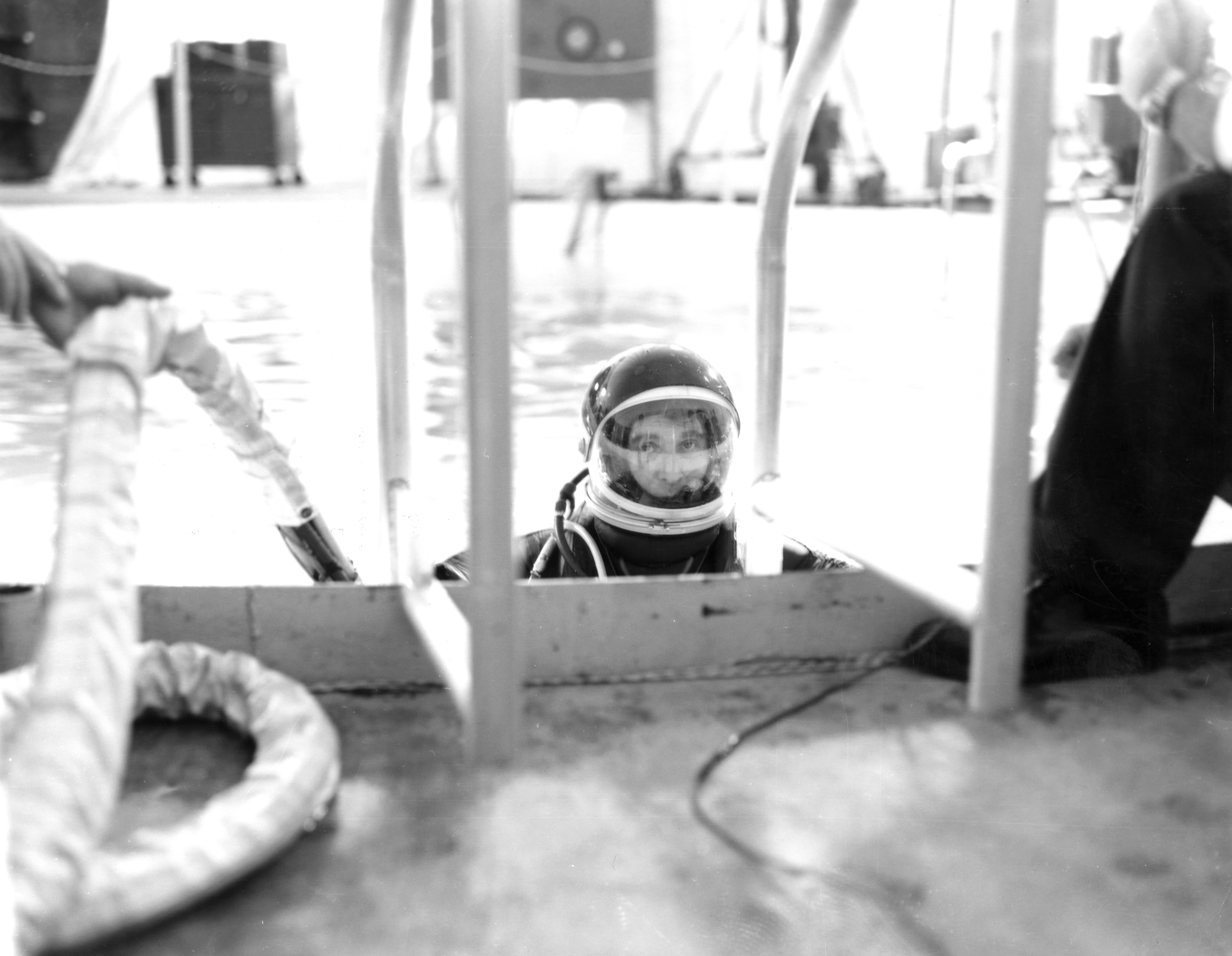
On November 14, 1967, Wernher von Braun (pictured) took a dive in a space suit. While underwater, he reviewed the S-IVB Aft Dome hardware and installed penetration seals. The next day, astronauts Gordon Cooper, Jack Lousma, and Bruce McCandless performed the same task in scuba gear. When informed of this, von Braun commented, "Misleading! With scuba gear it is a cinch. The pressurized suit is what makes it difficult!"

By early 1967, the schedule for the simulator was full. Though Alan Bean had visited and consulted on the project, the intent of the simulator was not astronaut training but to verify that "the MSFC developed hardware is safe, simple to handle, accessible, and trouble-free," wrote F. Belew in his March 13 report to von Braun. Focus at this time was largely on early development of procedures for the Apollo Applications Program. Due in large part to Bean's enthusiasm for the project, the Manned Spacecraft Center coordinated with MSFC to provide two astronauts on an as-needed basis, medical support, crew quarters, and safety consultations for simulations.

In the same report, Belew said that people found it necessary to use both hands for most tasks – one to do the work and the other to provide leverage for the work. He also outlined plans for a third tank to be installed in building 4706.

== Foundations for a third tank ==
It was clear early on that a larger simulator was necessary for testing procedures with Skylab (21.67 feet (6.61 m) diameter by 24.3 feet (7.4 m) high) and other hardware in the pipeline. It was also clear that its construction would require some creative financing and political maneuvering. In his September 12, 1966 memo to Wernher von Braun, Kuers disclosed, "[Bean] had apparently been told of our plans regarding the new large neutral buoyancy type simulator, and in response to his point blank questions regarding this, he was candidly shown the design blueprints by responsible ME personnel. Consequently, Houston is now aware."

There was no budget for additional facilities, so managers decided to modify an existing facility by building a tank within it using tooling funds and in-house fabricators. Stocks explained, "All we had was the Directors Discretionary funds available at the time. We were not allowed to construct a new building for the tank, so a leak was discovered under the model and prototype building. This leak required about [8 feet (2.4 m)] of concrete under the floor to repair." Thus the foundation of building 4706 was prepared in July 1967, to support a tank holding 1,300,000 US gallons (4,900,000 L) of water.

Ed Buckbee wrote that the funding irregularities "prompted a GAO (Government Accountability Office) audit and reprimand, but contributed to the Marshall lore of creativity and pragmatism in getting the job done."

== Third tank ==
Welding of the new tank took place in October and November 1967, after which a 40 feet (12 m) deep, 75 feet (23 m) diameter pool was nearly ready. Remaining work, according to Kuers' November 20 report, included installation of a "two-ton hoist, a breathing air system, a scuba cylinder filling system, a new recompression chamber, the installation of the instrumentation in a trailer to be located between Buildings 4706 and 4705, the procurement and the installation of a diving bell and airlock and the design, procurement and installation of an elevator to operate between ground floor and the upper platform and to be used for the movement of both people and equipment."

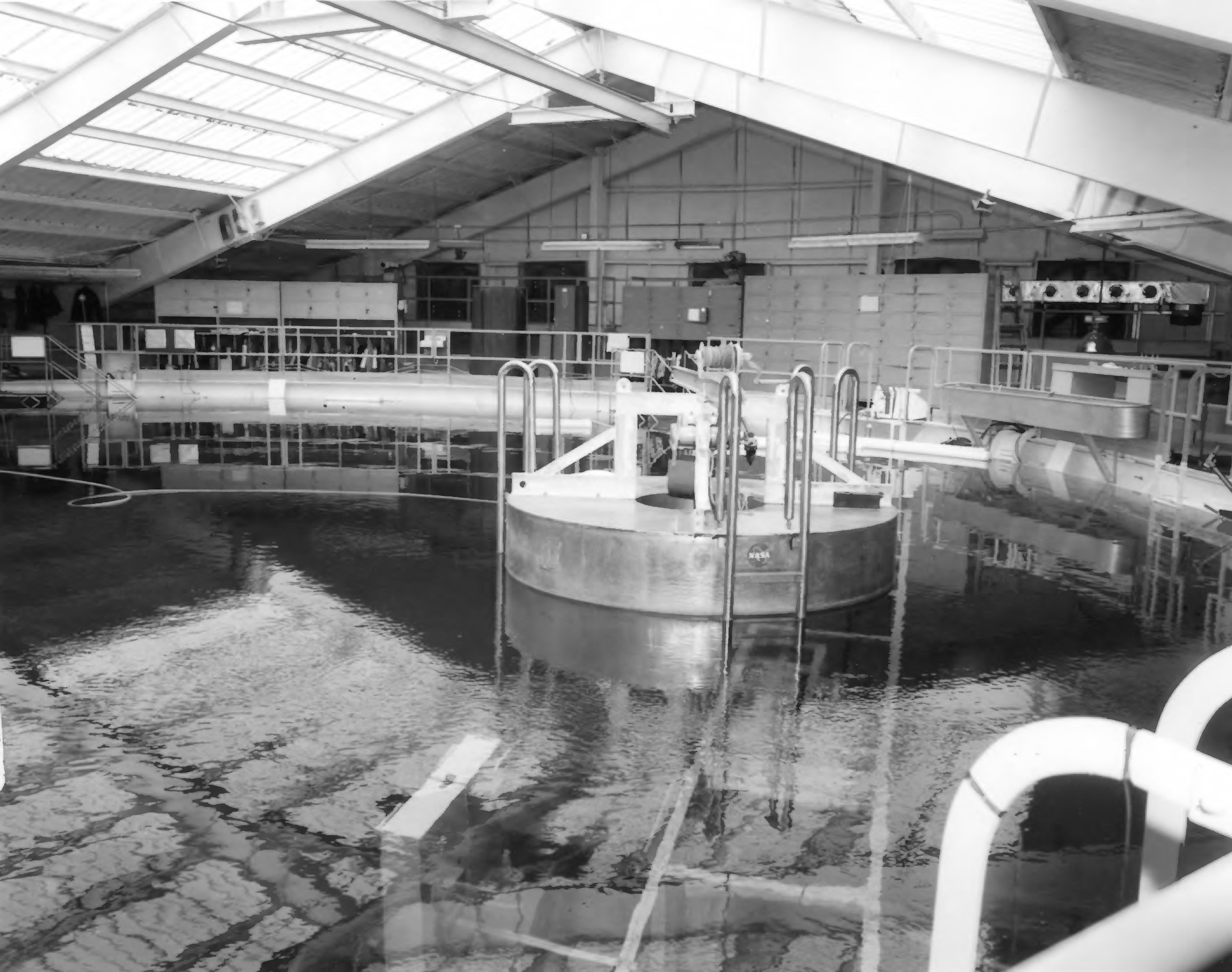
The top of the third tank being so near the roof posed challenges for inserting large test hardware.

Final preparations for testing took several more months. Engineers elected to fill the tank slowly to be able to repair any leaks found along the way, and they filled it, finding and fixing a few leaks, between February 29 and March 11, 1968. Thus readied, workers began installing test equipment. Workers had to develop new techniques to assemble parts underwater because of the low clearance between the top of the tank and the enclosing building's roof.

With the prospect of astronauts diving in pressure suits, the Manned Spacecraft Center (now Johnson Space Center), introduced a new level of safety to MSFC in the form of an Operational Readiness Inspection (ORI) committee which evaluated the facility for safety concerns. The committee was formed in December 1967. They carried out inspections and oversaw exercises to demonstrate readiness for a variety of contingencies. After nearly a year of a full tank, the procedures were ready for suited astronauts.

The first suited astronaut dive in the new tank was an exercise to develop Apollo Telescope Mount film retrieval techniques. Paul Weitz and Joseph Kerwin donned Apollo A5L suits (predecessor to the Apollo/Skylab A7L) and practiced film retrieval by both parallel rails and the trolley system while Edward Gibson observed in scuba gear on March 4, 1969. Their experiences led to a tether restraint system, heat exchanger in the space suit air supply, adjusting the umbilical so that it was neutrally buoyant, tweaks to the weighting system for the A5L suit, and a new foot restraint design.

With the addition of trailers for control and dressing rooms between buildings 4705 and 4706, the combination became referred to as building 4705.

== 1969 to 1997 ==
Engineers used the Neutral Buoyancy Simulator for working out kinks in designs, and astronauts provided feedback from their experiences in the simulator. For example, on August 6 and 7, 1969, astronauts Owen Garriott, Walter Cunningham, and Rusty Schweickart evaluated the Apollo Telescope Mount EVA film retrieval system.

The simulator's hyperbaric chamber saw its first use for its intended purpose the night of September 24–25, 1969, when a TVA worker suffering decompression sickness near Knoxville was airlifted to MSFC for treatment arriving about midnight. NASA and TVA doctors attended treatments. The first round of treatment provided some improvement for the diver, but recovery was slow as of October 20. The patient had suffered a lesion on his spine and subsequent paralysis from the waist down. Sensory perception was returning, but not motor function.

Astronauts performed Skylab training at the Neutral Buoyancy Simulator in the early 1970s. Astronauts Conrad and Kerwin prepared for their Skylab 2 EVA missions by simulating their requirements in the Neutral Buoyancy Simulator before proceeding with the repairs in outer space.

Following Skylab, the role of the NBS evolved into a facility for technical spacecraft concept definition, design development, design verification, and human design requirements definition, though some crew training continued periodically throughout its operational lifetime. This included not only training for NASA Extravehicular Activity (EVA) crews, but training of the US Air Force Post-Manned Orbital Laboratory astronauts and for the Massachusetts Institute of Technology and University of Maryland. It served as the foundation for defining the modules and structures now assembled as the International Space Station.

Post Skylab, the Neutral Buoyancy Simulator (NBS) continued under the management of MSFC Test Laboratory supported by the original NBS crew. However, responsibility for assisting and coordinating the NBS users fell to the MSFC Man-System Integration Branch in the Science & Engineering organization. NBS Facility customers or users initially came from within the Marshall Space Flight Center (MSFC), but as the underwater simulator capabilities were recognized, additional requesters came from other NASA centers, industry, and academia. In fact, the NBS served as an educational laboratory for one or two months per year through the 1980’s and most of the 90’s for students of the Massachusetts Institute of Technology (MIT) and subsequently for the University of Maryland until the tank’s closure. Of interest, the last NBS test was conducted by the University of Maryland Space Sciences Laboratory.

The pressure-suited test subjects often were the designers directly involved with the flight design where human interface was required, resulting in more efficient design products. Unique conditioning programs for the test subjects eliminated the variable of subject fatigue during the test with more believable test results.

Because of careful cost and manpower support efficiencies, the NBS and its related capabilities remained a competitive space simulation medium until being decommissioned by NASA in 1997. The Agency felt that it could not fund two similar facilities simultaneously, as the JSC had contracted with McDonnell Douglas Corporation (now Boeing Aerospace Corporation) to build a larger tank in the Clear Lake, TX area, closer to the astronauts. The MSFC NBS operational costs were significantly lower per test than those of the JSC Neutral Buoyancy Laboratory and provided a cost competitive concept development medium for spaceflight definition and operations. Human capabilities and restrictions in a typical spacesuit were well defined as a result of neutral buoyancy tests in the NBS.

In support of NASA missions MSFC designed and built a full-size low fidelity Shuttle Payload Bay underwater mockup including a working underwater Shuttle Remote Manipulator System (SRMS) simulator, Payload Bay Radiators, and the rear portion of the Shuttle flight deck. An operational underwater Manned Maneuvering Unit (MMU) powered by trolling motors was also provided for underwater simulations.

Following the Skylab mission, NASA seriously considered assemblage of large space structures through manual and mechanical means. An in-house NBS study, the Structural Assembly Demonstration Experiment eventually evolved into the EASE/ACCESS mission flown on Space Shuttle Mission STS-61B (November 29 & December 1, 1985), integrating two manual structures assembly tasks developed in the NBS and then conducted from the Space Shuttle Atlantis payload bay. The Langley Research Center and MIT provided the flight hardware and procedures, with MSFC serving as management and demonstration coordinator. Astronauts Jerry Ross and Sherwood “Woody” Spring successfully demonstrated on-orbit manual assembly techniques as developed in the NBS.

Service and maintenance concepts were created and honed for the Hubble Space Telescope (HST) in the NBS. Part task mockups evolved into a full scale HST underwater mockup permitting the flight crews, working with MSFC engineers and Hubble experiment Principle Investigators (PI’s), to develop the HST crew servicing interfaces; followed by crew training for the HST servicing missions. The Hubble mockup was subsequently transferred to JSC for additional crew training.

The crew of Space Shuttle mission STS-41-C (April 6 – 12, 1984) trained in the NBS for the capture, repair, and release of the Solar Max satellite including utilization of the NBS underwater MMU.

The US space station design, evolving initially into Space Station Freedom and subsequently into the International Space Station, utilized the NBS regularly for pressure-suited and “shirtsleeve” flight crew operations. Space Station underwater mockups provided assessment opportunities of early module layout while developing assembly and maintenance concepts. The NBS was instrumental in developing pressurized module maintenance, servicing, and repairs, including tests conducted under dark (nighttime) conditions. Boeing Aerospace Company, the European Space Agency (ESA), and the Japanese Space Agency (NASDA) utilized the NBS for the Space Station Freedom planned and unplanned operations.

The US Air Force, when it still had a cadre of military astronauts, found the NBS a perfect simulation medium for their crew EVA orientation exercises.

The crew of Space Shuttle mission STS-41-C spent months training for the capture, repair, and release of the Solar Max satellite including practicing using the Manned Maneuvering Unit.

Because of careful cost and manpower support efficiencies, the NBS and its related capabilities remained a competitive space simulation medium until being decommissioned by NASA.

On the other hand, post-Skylab the MSFC NBS had grown into a first-class space design concept development tool, offering a simulation medium for ideas to grow into reality with very minimum cost and low fidelity test hardware. The NBS tests did not require astronauts as test subjects, and in most cases did not want them participating until a design could be developed and enhanced to a point that flight crew input was appropriate. Of course, it was always available to those astronauts wishing to participate in concept development (e.g., early Space Telescope, Manned Maneuvering Unit, etc.). It also provided young free thinking college students and instructors the opportunity to try concepts without human test subject participation. Robotics were recognized by the space community as a way to accomplish the building and maintaining of large structures and facilities in the micro-gravity environment. Before closure, commercial and academic robotic concepts were being regularly tested in the NBS. Government and contractor engineers and designers often served as test subjects. The first-class recompression chamber at the NBS was available to Tennessee Valley Authority (TVA) and the Corps of Engineers, as well as private individuals in hyperbaric distress, and was used on occasion for such emergencies.

The Neutral Buoyancy Simulator was declared a National Historic Landmark in 1985.

Engineers continued to develop procedures and astronauts continued to train in the simulator for the Hubble Space Telescope missions, and International Space Station assembly through the tank's decommissioning in 1997.

== Gallery ==
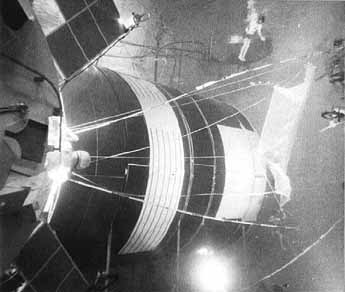
Astronauts practice rigging protective shielding on Skylab in the simulator, 1972

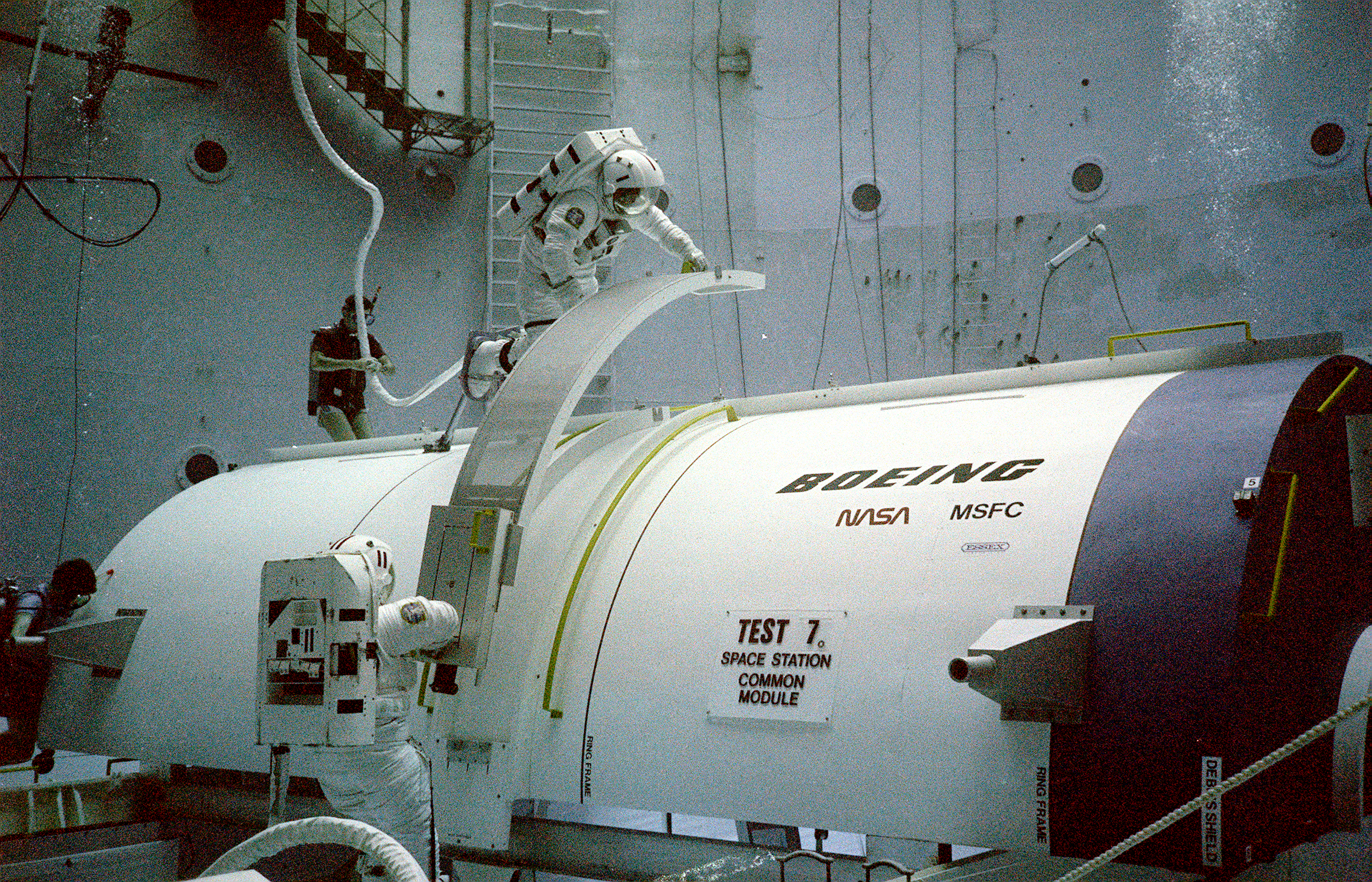
Astronauts practice assembly of the International Space Station, 1985

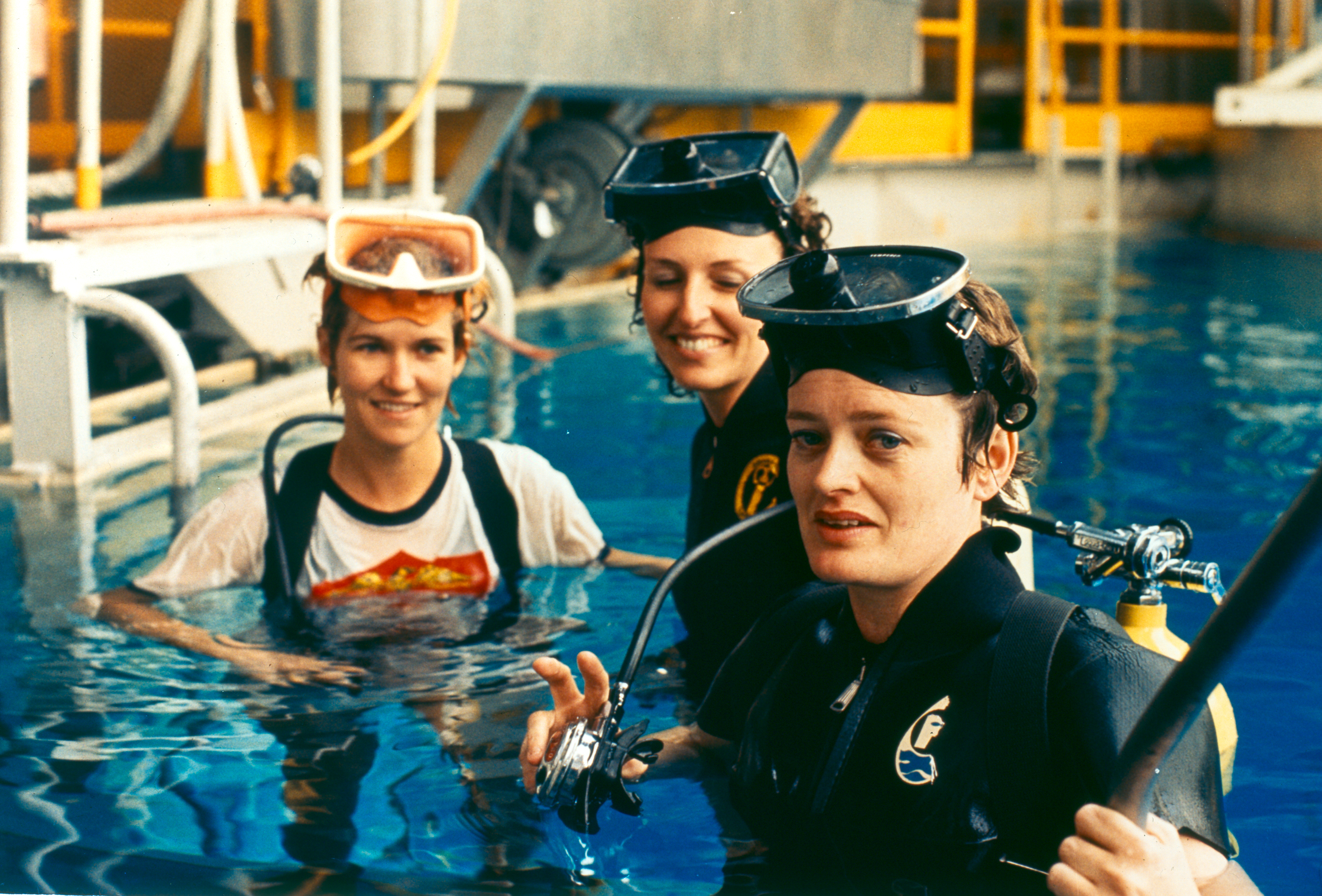
Scientists practice activities in the simulator to understand complications of working in space, 1974

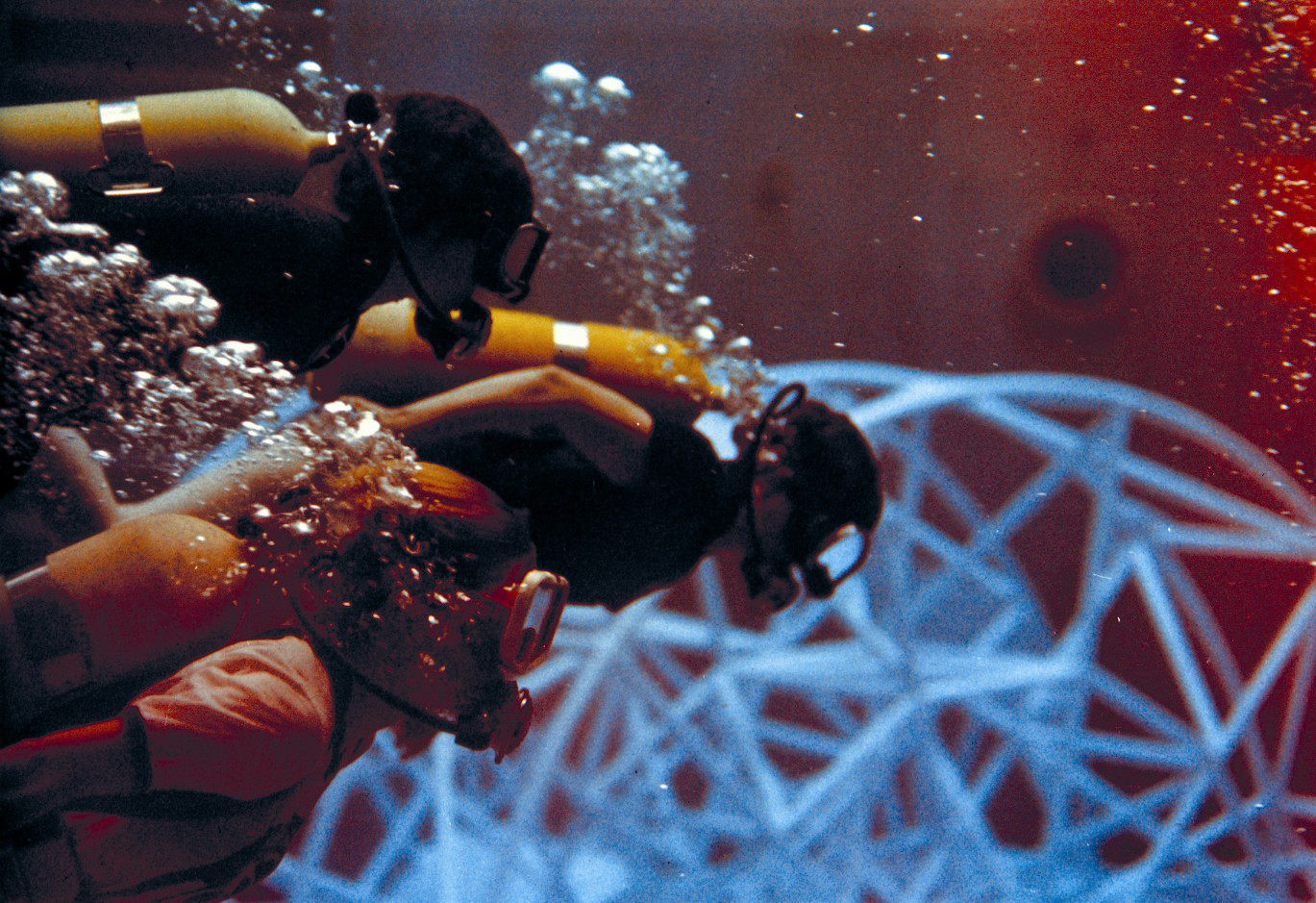
Scientists Carolyn Griner, who would later become MSFC director, and Ann Whitaker train.

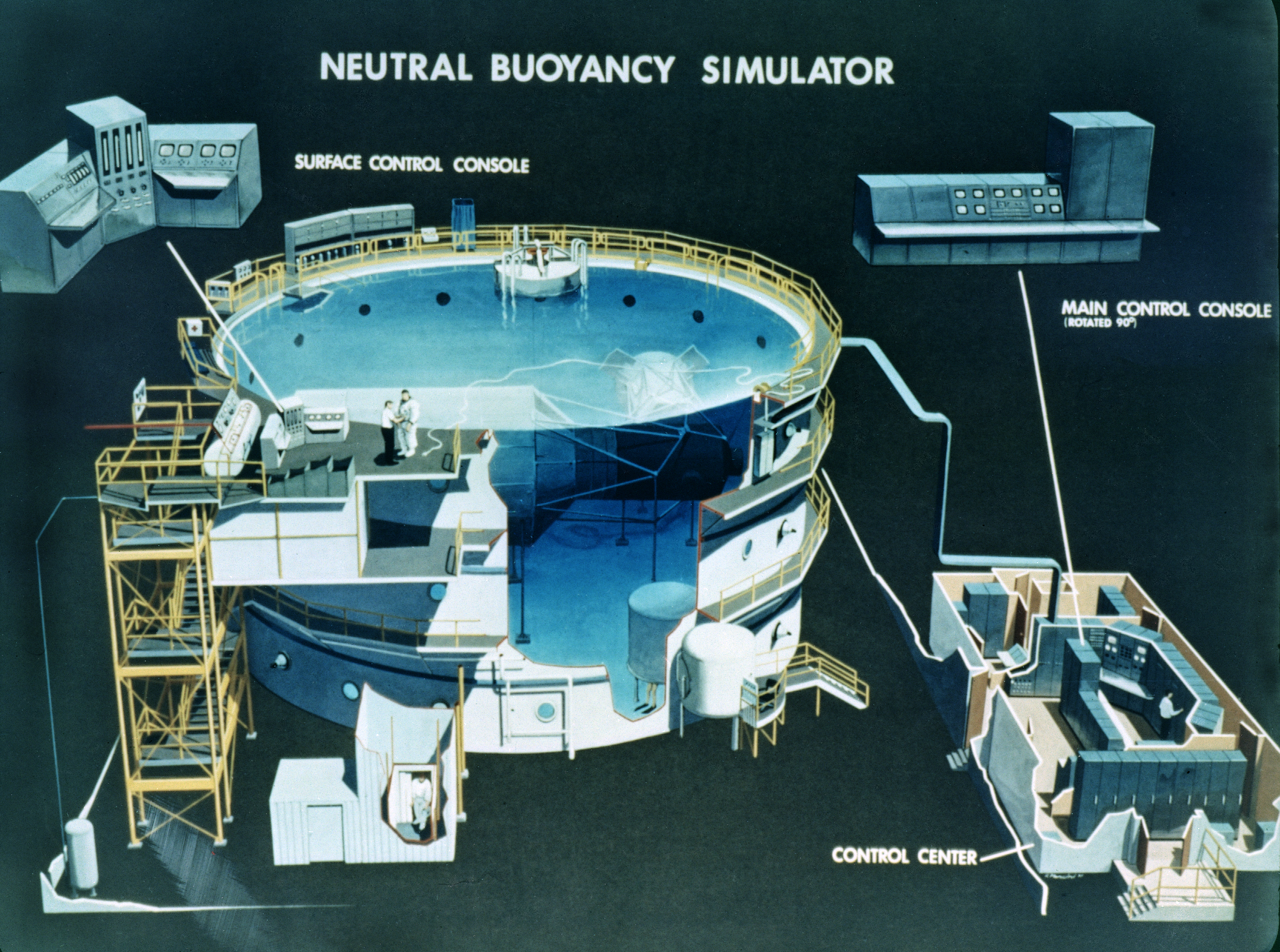
Main components highlighted.

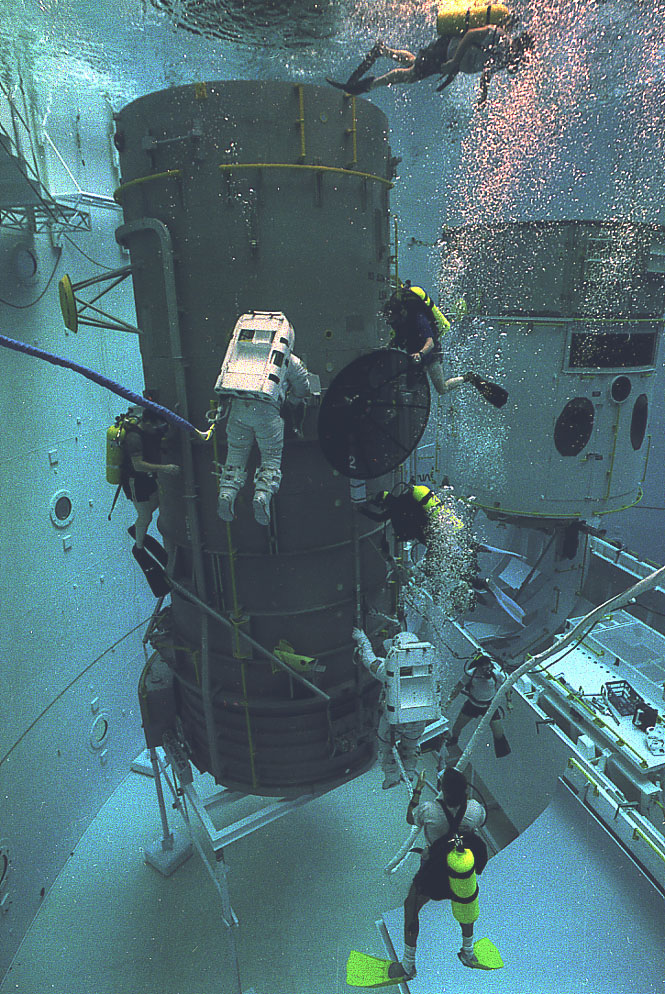
Astronauts train on Hubble Space Telescope

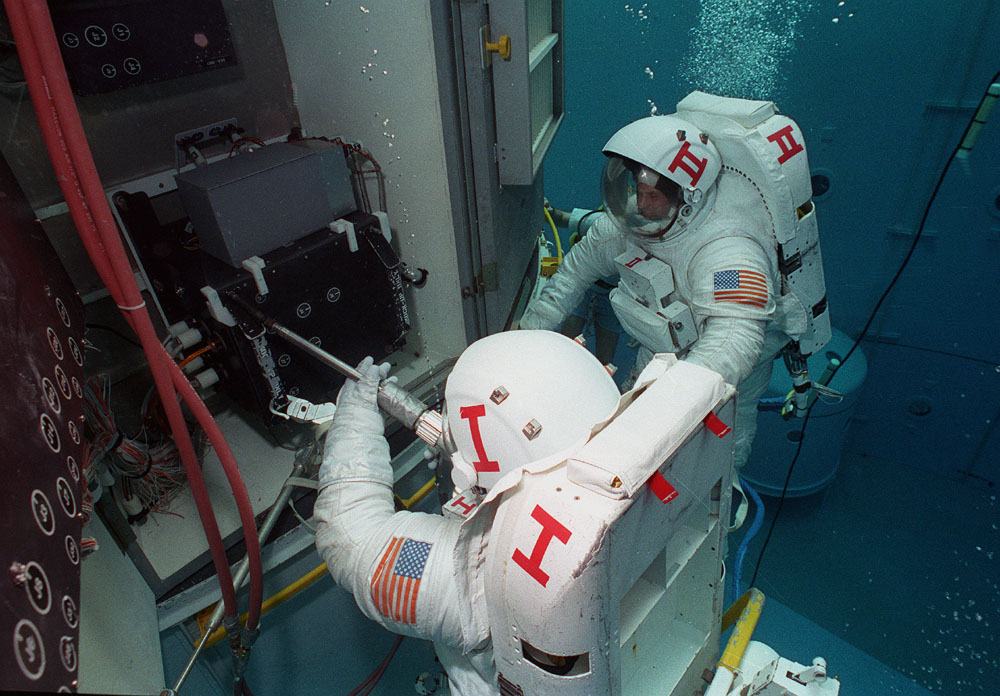
Astronauts practice changing out the Hubble Space Telescope's Wide Field Planetary Camera.

== See also ==
- Neutral Buoyancy Laboratory, the recent pool in use, Johnson Space Center
