= Neutral buoyancy simulation as a training aid =

Astronaut training in a neutral buoyancy environment

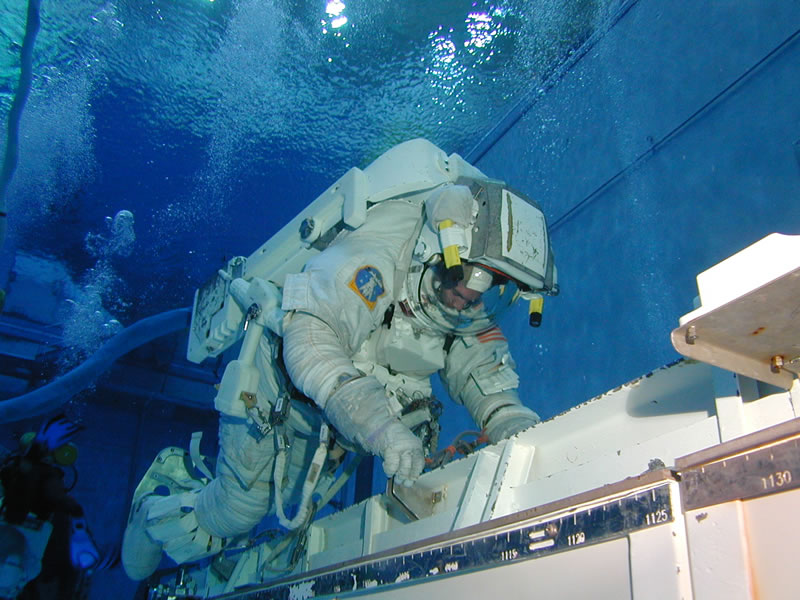
An astronaut training at the Neutral Buoyancy Laboratory at the Johnson Space Center.

Neutral buoyancy simulation with astronauts immersed in a neutral buoyancy pool, in pressure suits, can help to prepare astronauts for the difficult task of working while outside a spacecraft in an apparently weightless environment.

== History ==
Extra-vehicular activity (EVA), working outside the space vehicle, was one of the goals of the Gemini Program during the 1960s. The astronauts were trained in the “zero gravity” condition by flying a parabolic trajectory in an aircraft that caused reduced gravity for thirty second intervals.

=== Pioneers without sufficient training ===
The Russian cosmonaut Alexei Leonov was the first to egress his vehicle while travelling in orbit above the Earth. Shortly after, Ed White, Gemini IV, was the first American astronaut to egress a vehicle while in space. These were demonstrations of a capability to get out of and back into the vehicle but included no EVA tasks. The next three flights to demonstrate an EVA capability were Gemini IX-A, X, and XI. Each of these flights exposed problems with performance of EVA tasks. Working in pressure suits while in the constant weightlessness of orbital spaceflight was more complex and difficult than had been anticipated. NASA determined that training for EVA tasks required further development.

=== Origins of neutral buoyancy training ===
In July 1966 the Gemini Program joined in a NASA Langley Research Center contract to include an evaluation of Gemini EVA tasks. The contractor, Environmental Research Associates of Randallstown, MD had already begun developing a neutral buoyancy simulation capability in 1964. This capability for pressure suited subjects was initially developed in 1964 by utilizing an indoor swimming pool at a private school (McDonogh School near Baltimore). Initially, these early underwater simulations were simply designed to test the ability of subjects to move about mock-up airlocks and weights were not attached to the subjects. Quickly, Environmental Research Associates' submerged testing evolved into proper neutral buoyancy simulation, featuring weighted subjects and numerous safety divers on hand during given sessions.

=== First evaluation by astronauts ===
Scott Carpenter was the first astronaut to evaluate the contractor's operation, in a "wet workshop" simulation. The task was to remove bolts while in a submerged simulated airlock. The bolt removal task was designed to create access to a spent S-IVB dome. Carpenter's evaluation of the simulation was favorable and NASA quickly provided mockups of Gemini vehicles and docking components to facilitate further development of EVA capabilities via neutral buoyancy training. Astronaut Gene Cernan first visited the McDonogh School indoor pool facility for post-mission evaluation of problems that he encountered during his Gemini IX-A EVA. NASA then modified the contract to include pre-mission training of Gemini XII astronaut, Buzz Aldrin. Astronaut Cernan also participated in this pre-mission training, as he was in a backup role to Aldrin as pilot of Gemini XII.

=== Gemini XII EVA training ===
Aldrin trained for the original Gemini XII EVA version which was then revised to eliminate the task of using a Manned Maneuvering Unit. Aldrin returned to the McDonogh facility and trained for the final version of his EVA. NASA considered the flight EVA to be a total success, and Aldrin again returned to McDonogh to perform a post-mission evaluation of the EVA. The post-mission evaluation verified the value of using neutral buoyancy simulation training before attempting all of the EVA tasks while wearing a pressure suit and working in the hostile environment of space. Aldrin himself recognized some minor flaws of neutral buoyancy training, but described the method to have a "considerable advantage" over Keplerian trajectory aircraft.

=== Beyond Gemini ===
After the successful EVAs in the Gemini XII mission, NASA constructed tanks for neutral buoyancy simulation: The Water Immersion Facility at the Manned Spacecraft Center and the Neutral Buoyancy Simulator at Marshall Space Flight Center. Following use of those facilities during the Apollo and Skylab programs, NASA eventually constructed the Weightless Environment Training Facility at the Manned Spacecraft Center in Houston and later the Neutral Buoyancy Laboratory, where Shuttle and Space Station astronauts are trained in neutral buoyancy. Astronauts and cosmonauts also train at the Yuri Gagarin Cosmonaut Training Center near Moscow. These accomplishments were summarized in a feature article published by the Baltimore Sun newspaper in 2009. In September 2011, the Gemini XLV Symposium included a review of these accomplishments by G. Samuel Mattingly and featured remarks by astronauts Richard Gordon, Tom Jones, and Buzz Aldrin.

=== Rescuing Skylab ===
During the Skylab 2 mission, astronauts Conrad and Kerwin successfully opened a solar panel that had not automatically deployed after launch. To perform this task, the astronauts trained underwater in the Neutral Buoyancy Simulator at the Marshall Space Flight Center. However, due to differences between the design of the mock-up used for training and what they found at Skylab, the astronauts used makeshift tools and redesigned how they would accomplish the task while they were in outer space.

== Characteristics ==
=== Need for simulation ===
Astronauts rehearse extra-vehicular activity tasks in underwater neutral buoyancy before attempting those tasks in space to gain an understanding that they cannot use their weight to provide a force and that they may move or reposition themselves if they provide a propulsive force in any vector, either planned or inadvertent. Articles describing neutral buoyancy simulation generally point out that the astronaut's spacesuit is made neutrally buoyant but that the astronaut still feels gravity inside the spacesuit so the fit of the suit is very important, and that moving around in water, a viscous fluid, creates drag that is not present in EVA.

=== Normal gravity experience ===
The main purpose for an astronaut to egress the vehicle and go EVA is often to provide a force to push, pull, crank, squeeze or transport an object. While living in normal earth gravity people do not generally recognize the use of their weight to provide a force. The simple task of opening or closing a door, for example, is complicated when an individual is standing on a slick sheet of ice, so the individual's weight does not provide a frictional coupling to the ground. The application of force is an action requiring a reaction and if the individual's feet are slipping, the force application is limited or non-existent. The individual feels gravity standing on the ice but they cannot use their weight to provide traction and they cannot shift their weight to provide force in a horizontal vector so they cannot force the door. Giving the door a shove and sliding back is using mass inertia and not using the individual's weight. Mass inertia can also be used during EVA, but doing so in a pressure suit can produce unintended results.

=== Comparison ===
As stated above (in Need for simulation), the astronaut feels gravity inside the pressurized suit while immersed in water. However the astronaut-spacesuit combination, when properly balanced in neutral buoyancy as when in EVA, is weightless so the astronaut is, similar to standing on ice, unable to use weight to provide a force in any vector. The vector of any force is similar, if not exactly the same in EVA and in neutral buoyancy. The magnitude of the force, if static, is very similar and if dynamic is still similar although the force and vector used in moving large objects must be carefully studied and planned to make the simulation realistic. It is the inability to use weight in any vector in EVA coupled with the encumbrance of the pressure suit that makes task performance difficult.

=== Drag ===
Drag is the other major concern identified in articles on neutral buoyancy simulation. Any motion in the water is subject to drag and requires a little more time (seconds) and a little more force (ounces) to compensate for drag compared to the same motion in EVA. Early in the history of neutral buoyancy simulation there was consideration of providing the immersed astronaut with small motors to compensate for water drag, but this was soon dismissed as an unnecessary complication. Only a small percentage of time is spent in translating to a new location, usually at low velocity, generally less than 6 inches per second. Even such low velocities are subject to drag but it becomes difficult to measure amid the minor currents in the water caused by other astronauts, divers and the water circulation system that add to or subtract from drag.

=== Task performance ===
In EVA, most work is done slowly, carefully and methodically not because of the neutral buoyancy training but because that is how a task must be performed by a pressurized astronaut in weightlessness. It takes more force to accelerate a mass to a higher velocity, and then to slow the mass back down, than to move it slowly to its destination. It is also easier to control its movement if it is moving slowly. Thus, the drag of water on movement in neutral buoyancy simply necessitates a slowness of movement that is also appropriate to spaceflight.

=== Visual differences ===
There are other less obvious but important features that must be considered in underwater EVA training, such as the visual differences due to refraction at the air-water interface at the helmet's visor and position or attitude in the suit relative to the task. The personnel at the Neutral Buoyancy Laboratory in Houston plan and evaluate their simulations meticulously. Experienced EVA astronauts observing a simulation can advise as to how realistic is the task performance and recommend modifications.

=== Usefulness to EVA astronauts ===
Learning and rehearsing an EVA task in neutral buoyancy gives an astronaut or EVA specialist confidence that the planned task may be accomplished. The timeline developed for task performance is similar to the time required in EVA. In general, it is considered that a task performed and practiced in neutral buoyancy simulation can also be performed in EVA. Neutral buoyancy, properly planned and conducted, works because it is a realistic simulation of the physical requirements of performing a task in EVA.

=== Comparison with reduced gravity aircraft ===
The other major method used to simulate microgravity is flight in a reduced gravity aircraft (a so-called "vomit comet"), an aircraft which performs a number of parabolic climbs and descents to give its occupants the sensation of zero gravity. Reduced-gravity aircraft training avoids neutral-buoyancy training's drag problem (trainees are surrounded by air rather than water), but instead faces a severe time limitation: periods of sustained weightlessness are limited to around 25 seconds, interspersed with periods of acceleration of around 2 g as the aircraft pulls out of its dive and readies for the next run. This is unsuitable for practicing EVAs, which usually last several hours.
