= Space Systems Laboratory (Maryland) =

Neutral buoyancy facility at the University of Maryland

Coordinates: 38°59′34.4″N 76°56′22.0″W

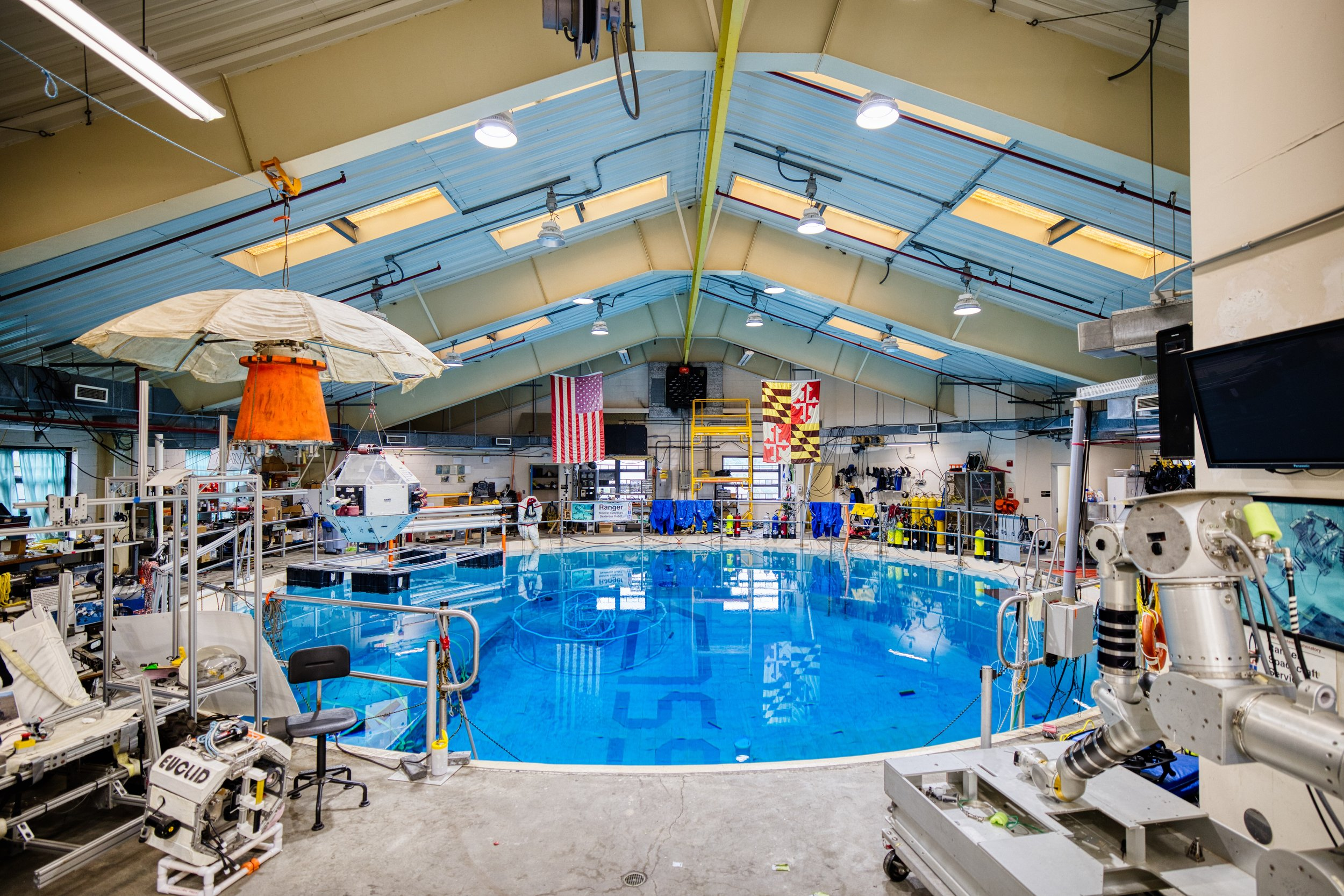
The tank at the SSL's Neutral Buoyancy Research Facility

SSL logo

The Space Systems Laboratory (SSL) is part of the Aerospace Engineering Department and A. James Clark School of Engineering at the University of Maryland in College Park, Maryland. The Space Systems Laboratory is centered on the Neutral Buoyancy Research Facility, a 50-foot-diameter (15 m), 25-foot-deep (7.6 m) neutral buoyancy pool used to simulate the microgravity environment of space. The only such facility housed at a university, Maryland's neutral buoyancy tank is used for undergraduate and graduate research at the Space Systems Lab. Research in Space Systems emphasizes space robotics, human factors, applications of artificial intelligence and the underlying fundamentals of space simulation. There are currently five robots being tested, including Ranger, a four-armed satellite servicing robot, and SCAMP, a six-degree of freedom free-flying underwater camera platform. Ranger was funded by NASA starting in 1992, and was to be a technological demonstration of orbital satellite servicing. NASA was never able to manifest it for launch and the program was defunded circa 2006. For example, Ranger development work at the SSL continues, albeit at a slower pace; Ranger was used to demonstrate robotic servicing techniques for NASA's proposed robotic Hubble Servicing Mission.

== History ==
The Space Systems Lab was founded at MIT in 1976, by faculty members Renee Miller and J.W. Mar. Its early studies in space construction techniques led to the EASE (Experimental Assembly of Structures in EVA) flight experiment which flew on Space Shuttle mission STS-61-B in 1985.

In 1990, lab director Dr. Dave Akin moved the lab to the University of Maryland. The Neutral Buoyancy Research Facility, or NBRF, was completed in 1992. Current projects include the MX-2 suit, a simplified neutral buoyancy spacesuit for use in EVA research; Power Glove, a prototype motorized spacesuit glove which will help reduce astronaut hand fatigue; and TSUNAMI, an apparatus to test human neuromuscular adaptation in different gravitational fields and different simulations of weightlessness.

== Partners ==
Along with labs at Carnegie Mellon and Stanford, the SSL is part of the Institute for Dexterous Space Robotics.

== See also ==
- Neutral Buoyancy Laboratory – NASA astronaut training facility in Houston, Texas
- SPHERES – Free-flying robotic system
