= Neutral buoyancy pool =

Pool of water in which neutral buoyancy is used to train astronauts

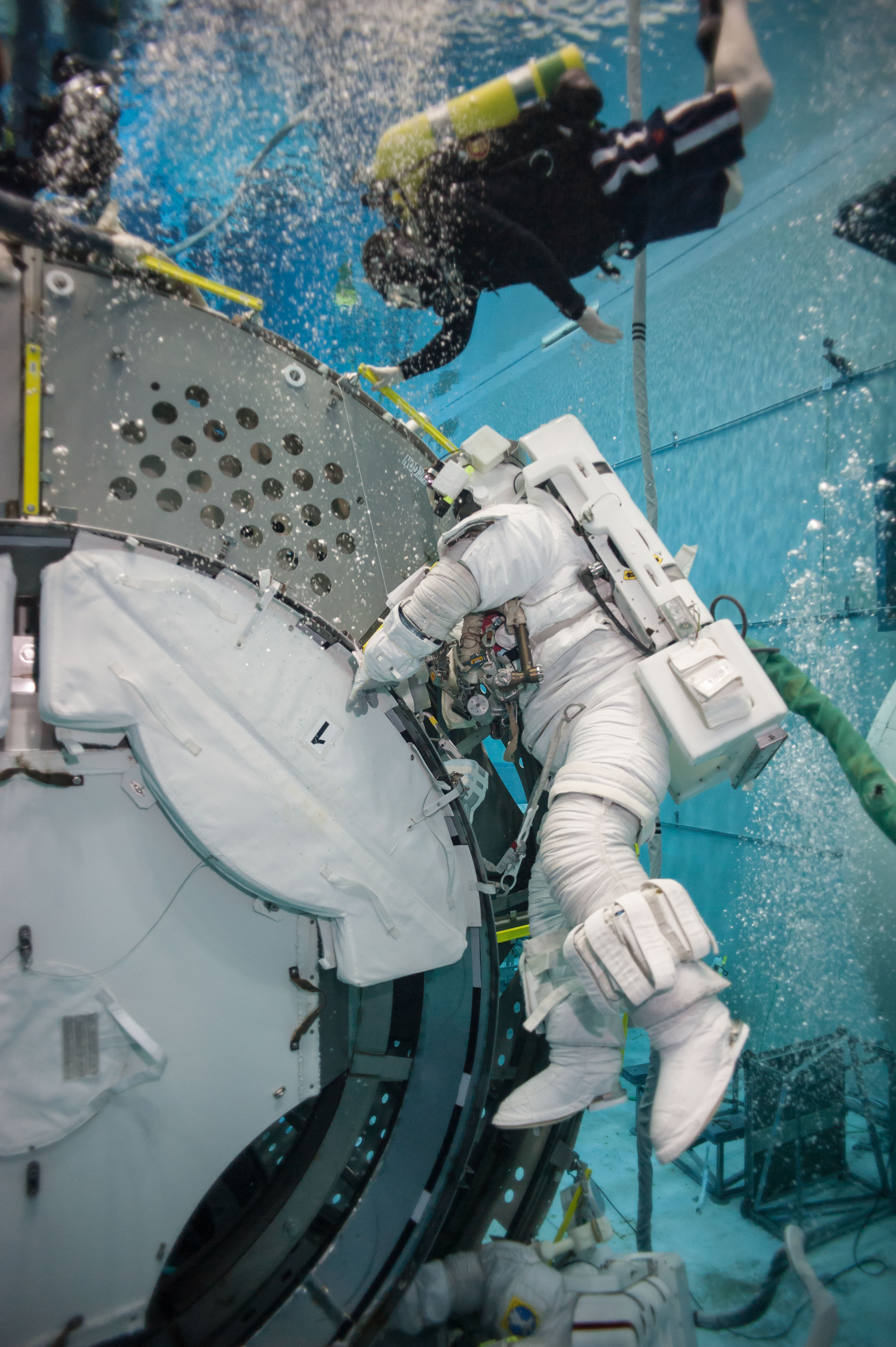
An astronaut training at the Neutral Buoyancy Laboratory in Houston.

A neutral buoyancy pool or neutral buoyancy tank is a pool of water in which neutral buoyancy is used to train astronauts for extravehicular activity and the development of procedures. These pools began to be used in the 1960s and were initially just recreational swimming pools; dedicated facilities would later be built.

== Space agencies ==
=== NASA ===
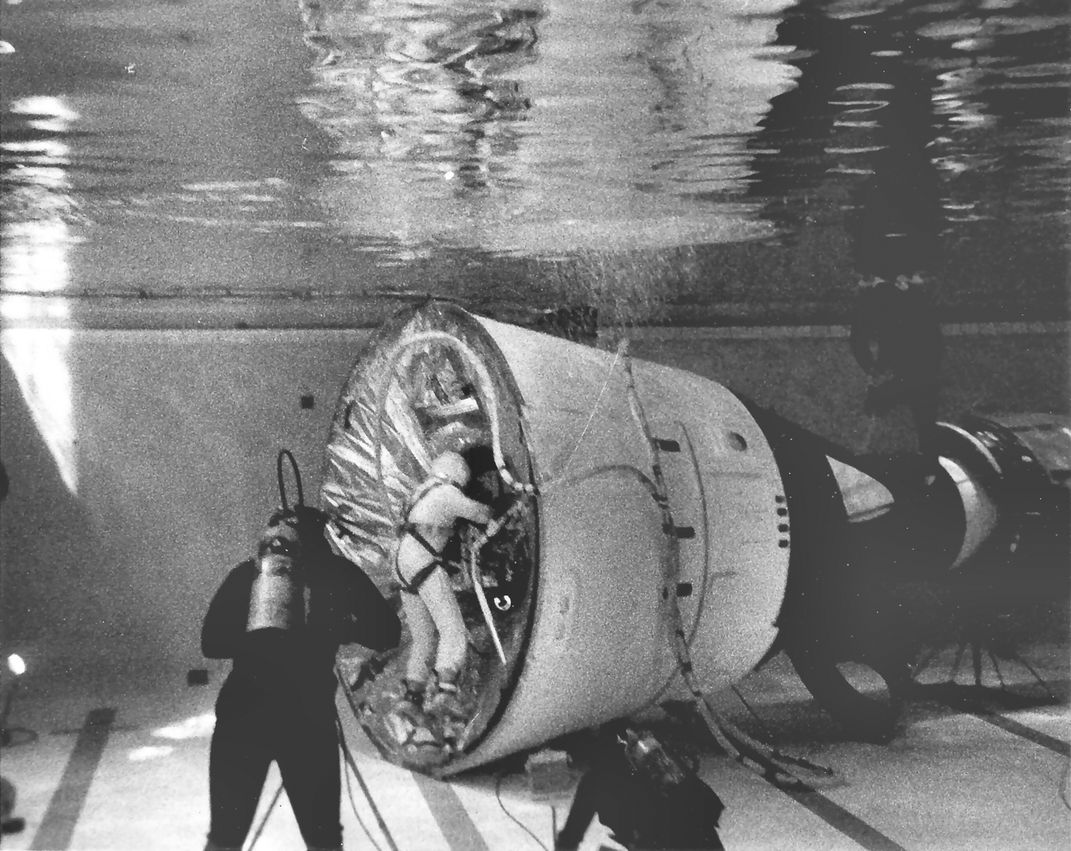
Buzz Aldrin training at the McDonogh School for his Gemini 12 spacewalk

Prior to May 1960, NASA recognized the possibility of underwater neutral buoyancy simulations, and began testing their efficacy. NASA engaged Environmental Research Associates, a company based in Baltimore, to try neutral buoyancy simulations first in a pool near Langley Research Center. Visitors and other issues disturbed those efforts, so they moved the operation to a swimming pool at the McDonogh School in Maryland, where Scott Carpenter was the first astronaut to participate suited. Then, after difficult EVAs through Gemini 11 in mid-September 1966, the Manned Spacecraft Center (later renamed the Johnson Space Center) fully understood the importance of testing procedures underwater, and sent the Gemini 12 crew to train at McDonogh.

==== Neutral Buoyancy Simulator (NBS) ====
The Neutral Buoyancy Simulator, located at the Marshall Spaceflight Center in Alabama, operated from 1967 through 1997. The facility had three tanks. The first had a diameter of 2.4 meters (8 ft) and a depth of 2.4 meters (8 ft). The second tank was built in 1966 and had a diameter of 7.6 meters (25 ft) and a depth of 4.6 meters (15 ft). A third tank was added around 1968 for Skylab and other planned projects; it had a diameter of 23 meters (75 ft) and was 12 meters (40 ft) deep.

Training in the NBS decreased when the Johnson Space Center opened its own neutral buoyancy pool in 1980, it eventually was closed in 1997.

==== Water Immersion Facility (WIF) ====
WIF was used for the Gemini and Apollo programs and was located in Building 5 at the Johnson Space Center in Houston, Texas.

The pool had a diameter of 7.6 meters (25 ft) and a depth of 4.9 meters (16 ft).

==== Weightless Environment Training Facility (WETF) ====
WETF, in operation from 1980 through 1998, was located in Building 29 at the Johnson Space Center in Houston, Texas. The dimensions of the pool were 24 meters (78 ft) by 10 meters (33 ft), with a depth of 7.6 meters (25 ft).

==== Neutral Buoyancy Laboratory (NBL) ====
In the late 1980s, NASA began to consider replacing the WETF, which was too small to hold useful mock-ups of many of the space station components planned for Space Station Freedom, which later morphed into the International Space Station. NASA purchased the then-processing facility from McDonnell Douglas in the early 1990s, and began refitting it as a neutral-buoyancy training center in 1994 with construction ending in December 1995. The NBL began operation in 1997.

The NBL is located at the Sonny Carter Training Facility, near the Johnson Space Center in Houston. The pool's dimensions are 62 meters (202 ft) by 31 meters (102 ft), with a depth of 12 meters (40 ft).

=== Roscosmos ===
Following the Voskhod 2 mission, a group at the Gagarin Cosmonaut Training Center (GCTC) proposed training for EVAs in a pool. In September 1969, GCTC created a working group to further study the idea, and some experiments were performed in their swimming pool near the end of that year. In 1970, cosmonauts Andriyan Nikolayev and Vitaly Sevastyanov visited NASA's new 23 meters (75 ft)-diameter pool at Marshall. Sevastyanov was even allowed to don a training suit and enter the pool. Following the visit, further interest in a similar facility began to grow within the Soviet space program. In November 1973, it was officially decided to construct a dedicated pool; until then, the center's swimming pool continued to be used.

==== Hydro Lab ====
Hydro Lab was completed in early 1980; the pool there has a diameter of 23 meters (75 ft) and a depth of 12 meters (39 ft).

=== CNSA ===
==== Neutral Buoyancy Facility (NBF) ====
The Chinese NBF is located at the China Astronaut Research and Training Center in Beijing. It has a diameter of 23 meters (75 ft) and depth of 10 meters (33 ft). Construction began in 2005 and was completed in November 2007. Operations began in 2008.

=== ESA ===
==== Neutral Buoyancy Facility (NBF) ====
The European NBF is located at the European Astronaut Center in Cologne, Germany. It has an octagonal shape and dimensions of 22 meters (72 ft) by 17 meters (56 ft), with a depth of 10 meters (33 ft). Operations began in 2002.

=== JAXA ===
==== Weightlessness Environment Test System (WETS) ====
WETS was located at the Tsukuba Space Center in Ibaraki, Japan. It opened in 1997 and closed in 2011 due to extensive earthquake damage. The pool had a diameter of 16 meters (52 ft), and depth of 10.5 meters (34 ft).

== Others ==
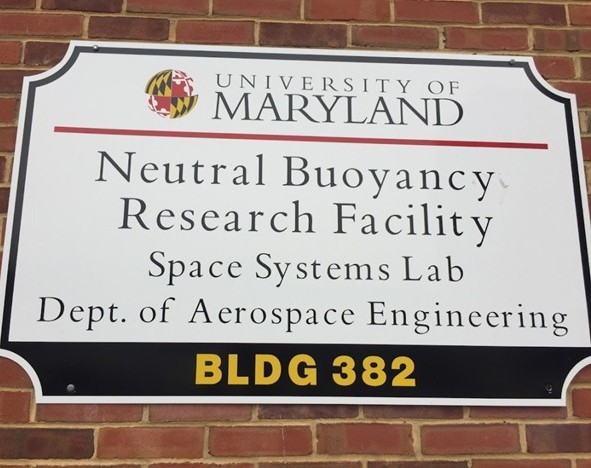
University of Maryland Neutral Buoyancy Research Facility sign

=== University of Maryland Neutral Buoyancy Research Facility (NBRF) ===
The NBRF is located at the University of Maryland in the US. The pool has a diameter of 15 meters (50 ft) and a depth of 7.6 meters (25 ft). It was built in 1992, and is the only neutral buoyancy facility on a university campus. The NBRF is part of the Space Systems Laboratory (SSL) which was originally located at the Massachusetts Institute of Technology (MIT). It split from MIT when the SSL was awarded a grant from NASA to build a dedicated neutral buoyancy pool. Since there was not enough space at MIT for the pool, it was decided to move the SSL to the University of Maryland.

=== Underwater Astronaut Trainer (UAT) ===
The UAT is located at the United States Space and Rocket Center, home of Space Camp and Space Academy, in Huntsville, AL. 30 feet wide and 24 feet deep, it was designed by Homer Hickam, a NASA engineer famous for writing Rocket Boys, adapted into the film October Sky. Opened in 1986, it is still active.

== Neutral-buoyancy training ==
During training exercises, neutral-buoyancy diving is used to simulate the weightlessness of space travel. To achieve this effect, suited astronauts or pieces of equipment are lowered into the pool using an overhead crane and then weighted in the water by support divers so that they experience minimal buoyant force and minimal rotational moment about their center of mass. The suits worn by trainees in the NBL are down-rated from fully flight-rated EMU suits like those in use on the Space Shuttle and International Space Station. Divers breathe nitrox while working in the tank.

=== Training challenges ===
One disadvantage of neutral-buoyancy diving as a simulation of microgravity is the significant amount of drag created by the water. This makes it difficult to set an object in motion, and difficult to keep it in motion. It also makes it easier to keep the object stationary. This effect is the opposite of what is experienced in space, where it is easy to set an object in motion, but very difficult to keep it still. Generally, drag effects are minimized by doing tasks slowly in the water. Another downside of neutral buoyancy simulation is that astronauts are not weightless within their suits, meaning that as divers tilt their suits they are pressed against whatever inside surface is facing down. This can be uncomfortable in certain orientations, such as heads-down. Thus, precise suit sizing is critical.

== Images ==
Scale comparison of neutral buoyancy pools (the top images depict overhead views; the bottom images depict side views)

== See also ==
- Neutral buoyancy – Equilibrium between buoyancy and weight of an immersed object
- Neutral buoyancy simulation as a training aid – Astronaut training in a neutral buoyancy environment
