= Neutral Buoyancy Laboratory =

NASA astronaut training facility in Houston, Texas

Coordinates: 29.6071°N 95.1439°W

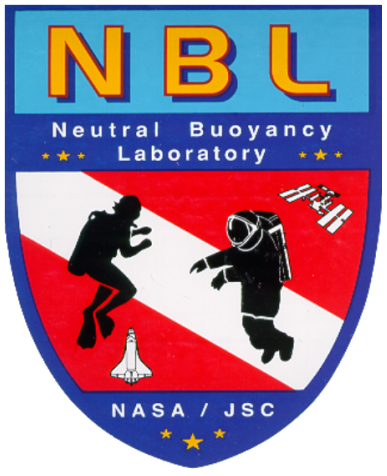

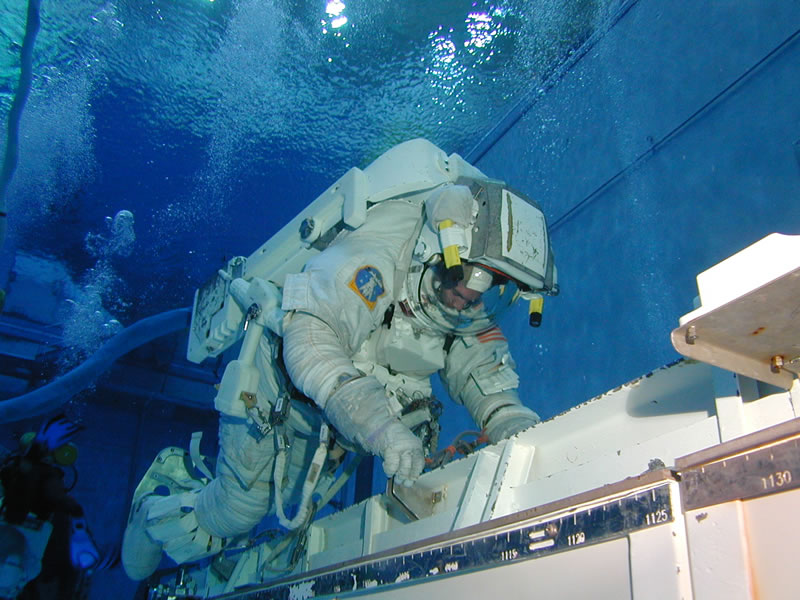
- An astronaut training in the NBL
- Established: April 1995
- Location: Houston, Texas, United States
- Operating agency: NASA
- Website: www.nasa.gov/johnson/neutral-buoyancy-laboratory/

The Neutral Buoyancy Laboratory (NBL) is an astronaut training facility and neutral buoyancy pool operated by NASA and located at the Sonny Carter Training Facility, near the Johnson Space Center in Houston, Texas. The NBL's main feature is a large indoor pool of water, in which astronauts may perform simulated EVA tasks in preparation for upcoming missions. Trainees wear suits designed to provide neutral buoyancy to simulate the microgravity that astronauts experience during spaceflight.

== History ==
In the late 1980s NASA began to consider replacing its previous neutral-buoyancy training facility, the Weightless Environment Training Facility (WETF). The WETF, located at Johnson Space Center, had been successfully used to train astronauts for numerous missions, but its pool was too small to hold useful mock-ups of space station components of the sorts intended for the mooted Space Station Freedom, or its successor, the International Space Station.

This new pool was going to be on Johnson Space Center property and was planned to be 72 meters (235 ft) by 41 meters (135 ft), with a depth of 18 meters (60 ft). To save money, it was downsized and placed inside an existing structure.

NASA purchased the structure that now holds the NBL from McDonnell Douglas in the early 1990s and began refitting it as a neutral-buoyancy training center in 1995.

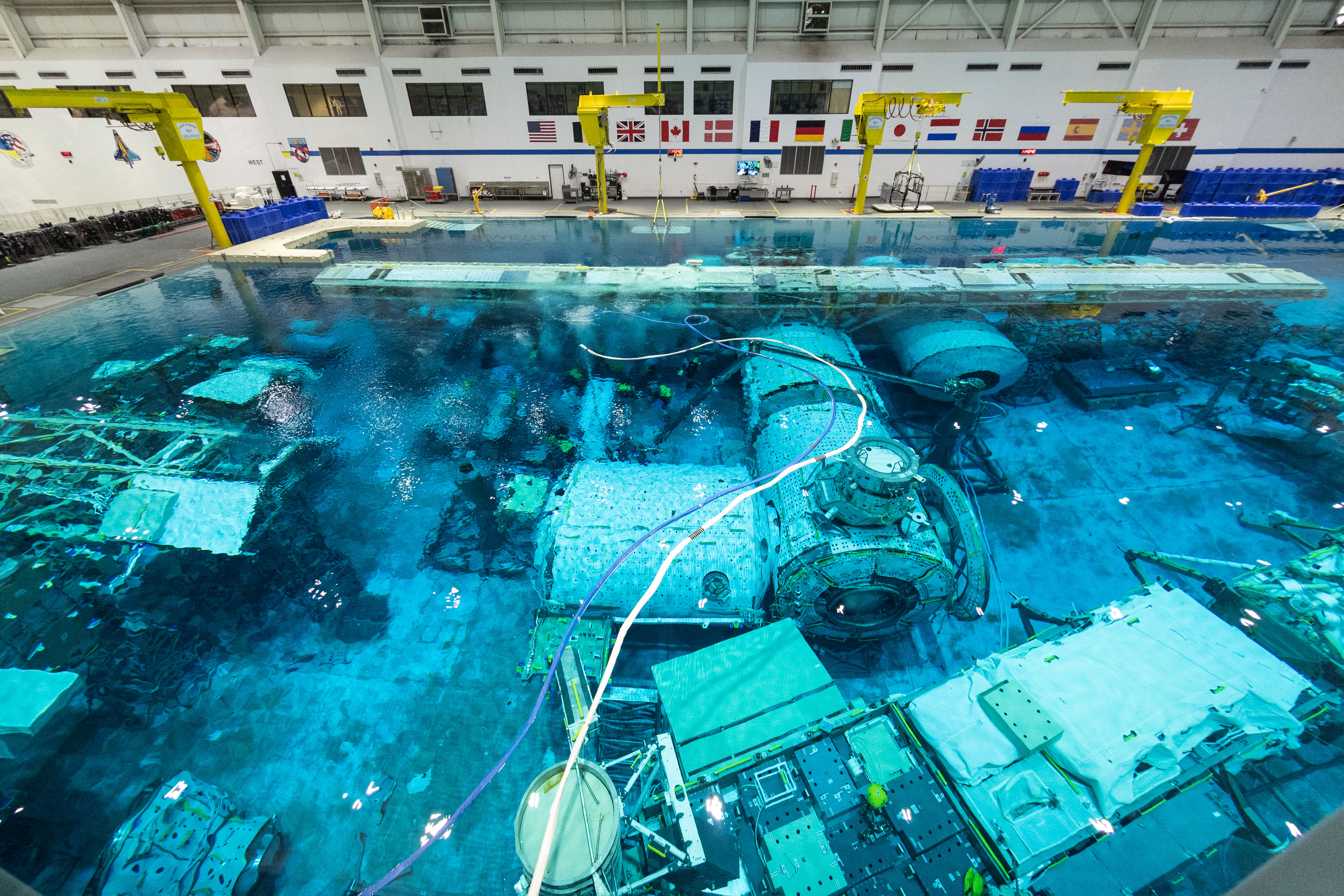
The 6.2-million-U.S.-gallon (23,000-cubic-meter) tank includes mock-ups of International Space Station modules and other training materials

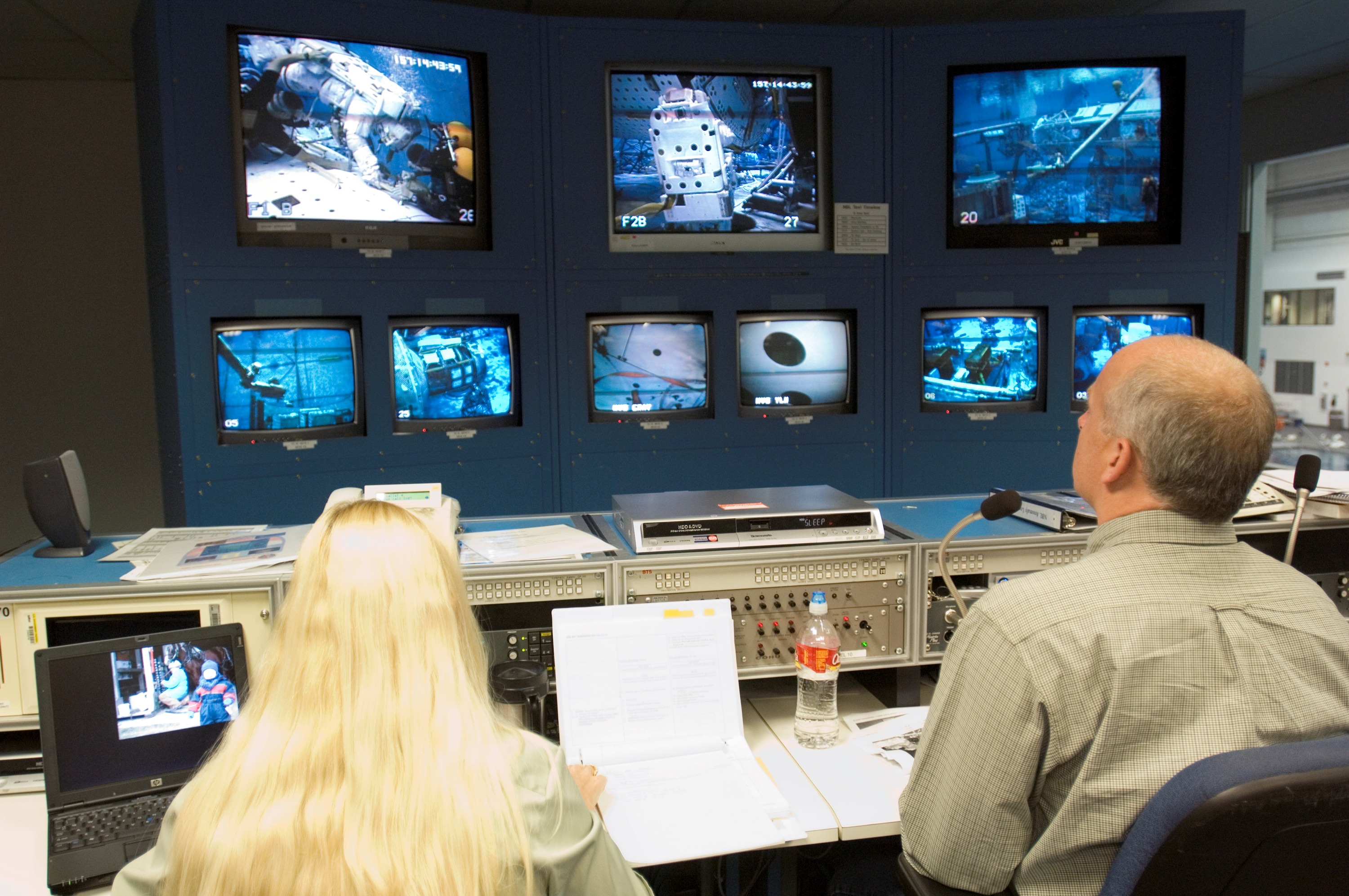
Simulation control area

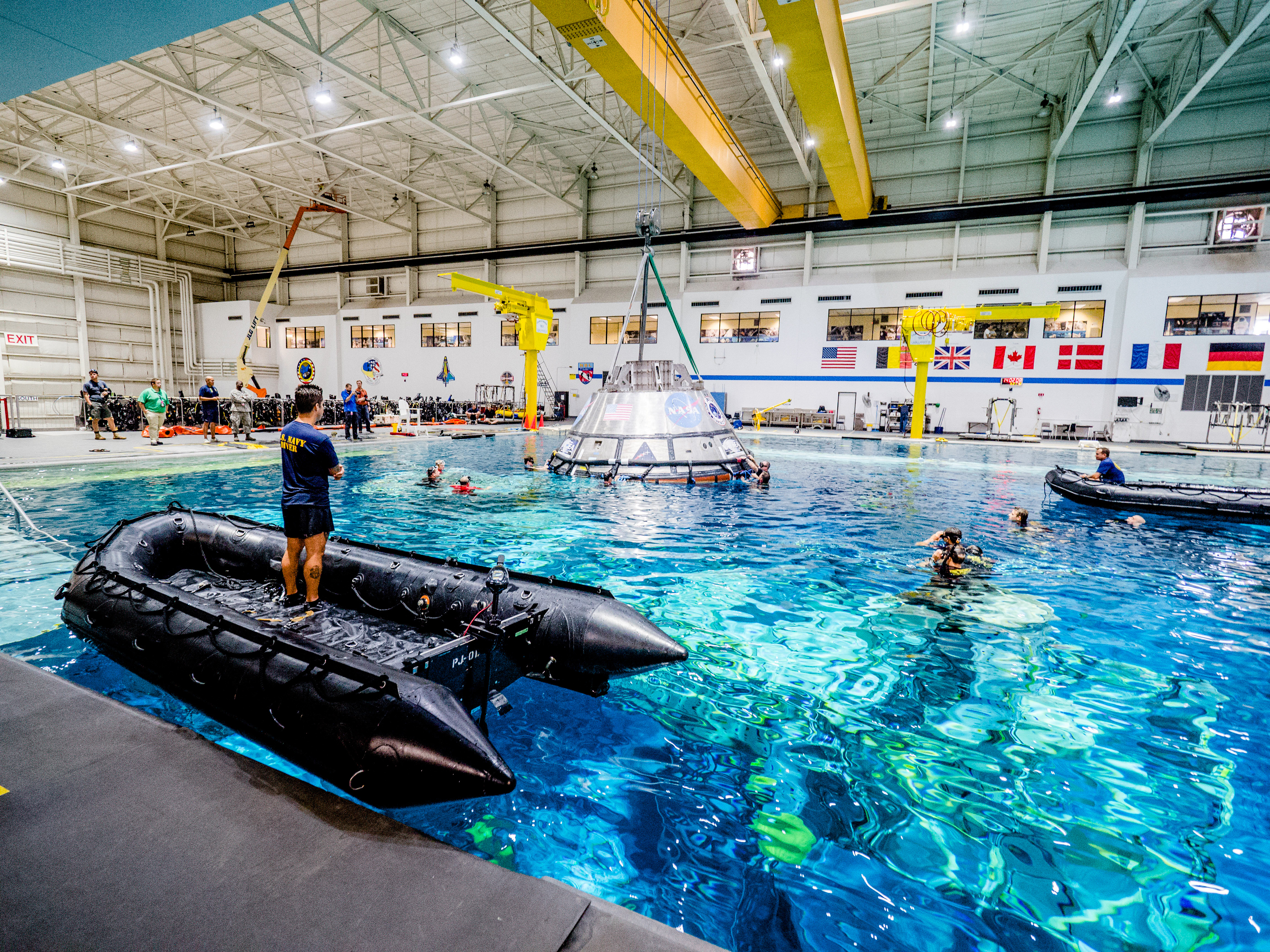
Orion capsule recovery diver practice

== Facility features ==
The diving tank is 202 feet (62 m) in length, 102 feet (31 m) wide, and 40 feet (12 m) deep, and contains 6.2 million US gallons (23,000 cubic metres) of water. The NBL contains full-scale mock-ups of International Space Station (ISS) modules and payloads, as well as visiting vehicles such as the Japan Aerospace Exploration Agency (JAXA) HTV, the European Space Agency ATV, the SpaceX Dragon, and the Orbital Sciences Corporation Cygnus. Full-scale mock-ups of equipment such as the Space Shuttle payload bay and Hubble Space Telescope have been removed, as they are no longer needed for training.

The facility contains a hyperbaric chamber for treating any dive related emergencies, as well as an altitude chamber to simulate physiological effects of flying.

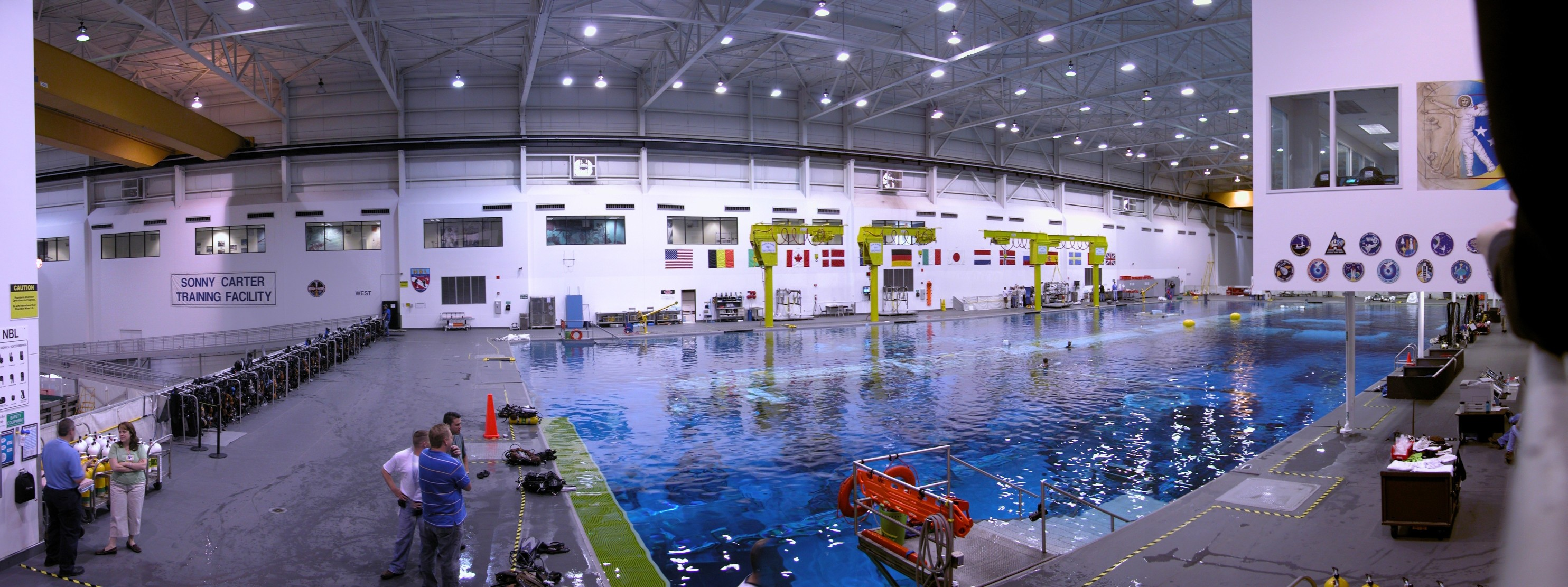
Neutral Buoyancy Laboratory

== See also ==
- Neutral buoyancy pool – Pool of water in which neutral buoyancy is used to train astronauts
- Weightlessness – Absence of the sensation of weight
- Reduced-gravity aircraft, also known as Vomit Comet – Aircraft used to create brief weightlessness
- Neutral Buoyancy Simulator – Historic astronaut training facility
