= Neutral buoyancy =

Equilibrium between buoyancy and weight of an immersed object

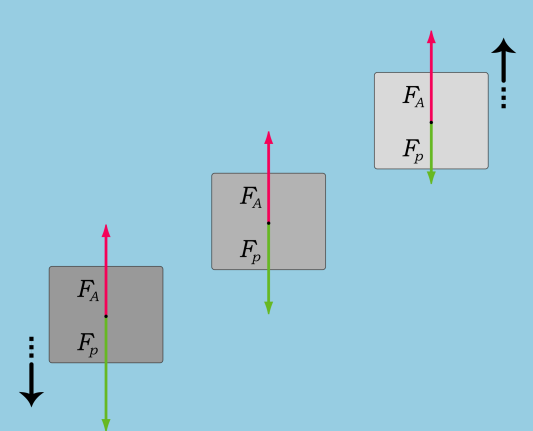
Balance of forces on objects with negative, neutral and positive buoyancy

Neutral buoyancy occurs when an object's average density is equal to the density of the fluid in which it is immersed, resulting in the buoyant force balancing the force of gravity that would otherwise cause the object to sink (if the body's density is greater than the density of the fluid in which it is immersed) or rise (if it is less). An object that has neutral buoyancy will neither sink nor rise.

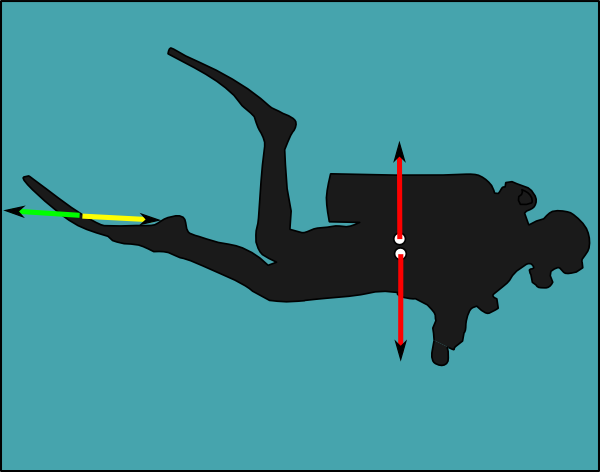
A neutrally buoyant diver does not need to fin to maintain depth

In scuba diving, the ability to maintain neutral buoyancy through controlled breathing, accurate weighting, and management of the buoyancy compensator is an important skill. A scuba diver maintains neutral buoyancy by continuous correction, usually by controlled breathing, as neutral buoyancy is an unstable condition for a compressible object in a liquid.

== History ==
The mathematician Archimedes discovered much of how buoyancy works more than 2000 years ago. In his research, Archimedes discovered that an object is buoyed up by a force equal to the weight of the water displaced by the object. In other words, an inflatable boat that displaces 100 pounds (45 kilograms) of water is supported by the same amount of force. An object that floats in a fluid is known as being positively buoyant. An object that sinks to the bottom is negatively buoyant, while an object that remains in balance at the same level in the fluid is neutrally buoyant. Ways to adjust buoyancy were developed to produce equipment such as the inflatable life jacket, which is filled with gas and helps to reduce a person's average density, assisting in floating and swimming, as well as certain diving equipment (including submarines and submersibles) which have adjustable volume air chambers to regulate buoyancy.

== Uses ==
Buoyancy is important in many fields. Boats, ships and seaplanes are engineered in a way that ensures that they remain afloat. Submarines have controllable buoyancy to make them submerge and rise on demand. Many objects were developed with buoyancy in mind, such as life preservers and pontoons.

Buoyancy is essential to most water sports. Many swimmers know that there are easy ways to float at the surface, such as lying on one's back or holding a full breath. Buoyancy becomes noticeable when a swimmer tries to dive to the bottom of the pool, which can take effort. Scuba divers work with many buoyancy issues, as divers must know how to float, hover and sink in the water. Scuba divers often wear lead weights to counteract the positive buoyancy of their bodies and gear.

Gases are also fluids, and so objects floating in the air may also be trimmed to be neutrally buoyant. A hot-air balloon that is neither sinking nor rising uses the lower density of hot air compared with the density of the surrounding air to produce sufficient upthrust to balance the weight of the basket and its contents.

=== Microgravity simulation ===
Neutral buoyancy is used extensively in training astronauts in preparation for working in the microgravity environment of space. NASA and the Russian space program maintain facilities in which suited astronaut trainees interact with mock-up space hardware, with the assistance of scuba divers. At the University of Maryland's Space Systems Laboratory, a neutral buoyancy tank is similarly used to evaluate the performance of prototype space robots.

== Characteristics ==
In a still fluid, when an object has neutral buoyancy, there is no net force causing it to float or sink. Any applied force will cause it to move in the direction of the force. If it has no momentum it will remain motionless.

== Appearance in nature ==
A fish's swim bladder controls buoyancy by adjusting the amount of gas in the swim bladder, allowing it to achieve neutral buoyancy at different depths. When a fish's overall density becomes higher or lower than the surrounding water due to volume change of the swim bladder following ascent or descent, it can correct this difference over time by a physiological process involving controlled absorption and elimination of gases via the blood circulation, the gills, and a gland adjacent to the swim bladder.

The human brain exhibits approximately neutral buoyancy as a result of its suspension in cerebrospinal fluid. The actual mass of the human brain is about 1400 grams; however, the net weight of the brain suspended in the CSF is equivalent to a mass of 25 grams. The brain, therefore, exists in nearly neutral buoyancy, which allows the brain to maintain its density without being impaired by its own weight, which would cut off blood supply and kill neurons in the lower sections.

== See also ==
- Category:Neutral buoyancy pools
