= Outward Odyssey =

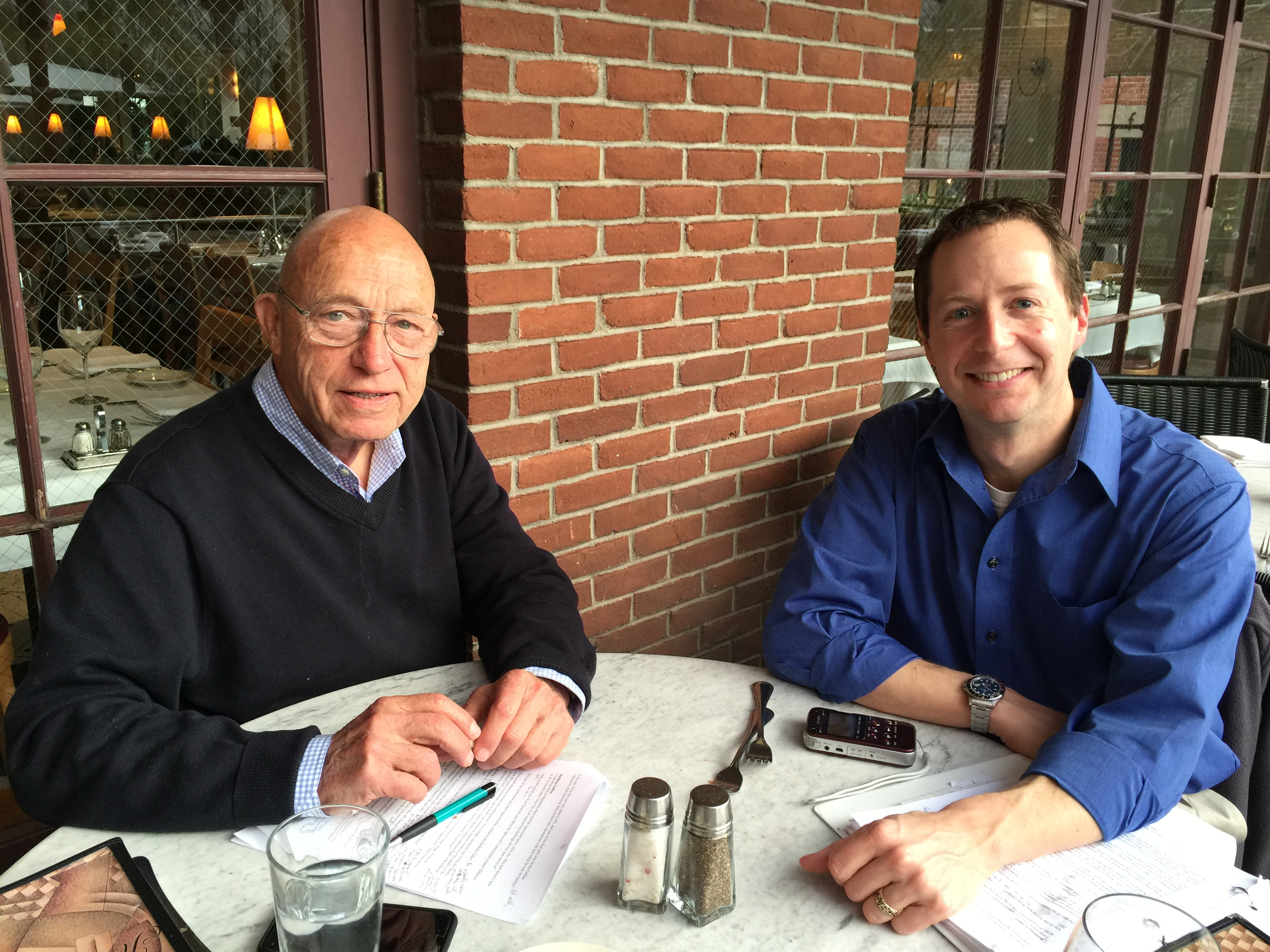
Author Jay Gallentine (right) interviewing JPL's John Casani for the 2025 book about him

Outward Odyssey: A People's History of Spaceflight is a book series dedicated to the history of spaceflight, published by the University of Nebraska Press. The series received the Ordway Award for Sustained Excellence in Spaceflight History in 2020; several books from the series were finalists of Eugene M. Emme Award. As of 2025, there are 25 books in the series.

== List ==
No	Name	Details	About	Notes
1	Into That Silent Sea: Trailblazers of the Space Era, 1961-1965	Francis French, Colin Burgess; 2007; ISBN 978-0803206977	Chronicles the American and Russian space programs from 1961 to 1965, covering Yuri Gagarin's first flight through Mercury, Vostok and Voskhod missions, ending with Alexei Leonov's first spacewalk.	Finalist for 2007 Eugene M. Emme Award.
2	In the Shadow of the Moon: A Challenging Journey to Tranquility, 1965-1969	Francis French, Colin Burgess; 2007; ISBN 978-0803209848	Covers the most exciting years in spaceflight with two superpowers racing to land on the moon, from Gemini flights through Soyuz program to early Apollo missions including the first moon landing.	Sequel to "Into That Silent Sea." A finalist for 2007 Eugene M. Emme Award.
3	Homesteading Space: The Skylab Story	David Hitt, Owen Garriott, Joe Kerwin; 2008; ISBN 978-0803219014	Tells the story of America's first space station from beginning to fiery end, written by two Skylab astronauts and a NASA journalist. Features unpublished diary of astronaut Alan Bean.	
4	To a Distant Day: The Rocket Pioneers	Chris Gainor; 2008; ISBN 978-1496211590	The book is about the pioneers of spaceflight, Konstantin Tsiolkovsky, Robert Goddard, Hermann Oberth, Wernher von Braun and others.	
5	Ambassadors from Earth: Pioneering Explorations with Unmanned Spacecraft	Jay Gallentine; 2009; ISBN 978-1496228680	Chronicles the pioneering unmanned spacecraft missions that explored the solar system.	Winner of Eugene M. Emme Award for astronautical literature.
6	Footprints in the Dust: The Epic Voyages of Apollo, 1969-1975	Colin Burgess (Editor); 2010; ISBN 978-1496228673	The volume chronicles the Apollo program from the first moon landing through the final mission.	
7	Realizing Tomorrow: The Path to Private Spaceflight	Chris Dubbs, Emeline Paat-Dahlstrom; 2011; ISBN 978-1496209672	Explores the development of commercial and private spaceflight industry, covering past, present and future of private space endeavors.	
8	The X-15 Rocket Plane: Flying the First Wings into Space	Michelle L. Evans; 2013; ISBN 978-0803246843	Tells the story of the hypersonic X-15 winged rocket ship that opened the way into human-controlled spaceflight, covering the 1950s flight research project.	
9	Wheels Stop: The Tragedies and Triumphs of the Space Shuttle Program, 1986–2011	Rick Houston; 2013; ISBN 978-1496209832	Chronicles the Space Shuttle program from the Challenger disaster through the final missions, covering both tragedies and achievements of the later shuttle era.	
10	Bold They Rise: The Space Shuttle Early Years, 1972-1986	David Hitt, Heather R. Smith; 2014; ISBN 978-0803255562	Documents the development and early years of the Space Shuttle program from conception through the first years of operation, ending with Challenger.	Companion to "Wheels Stop," covering the earlier shuttle period.
11	Go, Flight!: The Unsung Heroes of Mission Control, 1965–1992	Rick Houston, J. Milt Heflin; 2015; ISBN 978-0803284951	Focuses on the unsung heroes of NASA Mission Control during the golden age of spaceflight, covering 1965–1992.	
12	Infinity Beckoned: Adventuring Through the Inner Solar System, 1969–1989	Jay Gallentine; 2016; ISBN 978-0803285163	Covers robotic space exploration missions to the inner solar system during the peak years of planetary exploration.	
13	Fallen Astronauts: Heroes Who Died Reaching for the Moon	Colin Burgess, Kate Doolan; 2016; ISBN 978-0803285989	About the sixteen astronauts and cosmonauts who died during the Moon race.	
14	Apollo Pilot: The Memoir of Astronaut Donn Eisele	Donn Eisele, Francis French (editor); 2017; ISBN 978-0803299535	Personal memoir of Apollo astronaut Donn Eisele, providing insider perspective on the Apollo program from a crew member.	
15	Outposts on the Frontier: A Fifty-Year History of Space Stations	Jay Chladek; 2017; ISBN 978-1496201072	Comprehensive history of space stations covering fifty years of development and operations.	
16	The Ultimate Engineer: The Remarkable Life of NASA's Visionary Leader George M. Low	Richard Jurek; 2019; ISBN 978-1496218483	Biography of George M. Low, one of NASA's most influential leaders during the Apollo era and throughout the space program.	
17	Shattered Dreams: The Lost and Canceled Space Missions	Colin Burgess; 2019; ISBN 978-1496214218	Explores personal stories of those who lost opportunities to fly in space due to mission cancellations, personal reasons, or tragedies.	
18	Come Fly with Us: NASA's Payload Specialist Program	Melvin Croft, John Youskauskas; 2019; ISBN 978-1496212252	Tells the story of NASA's payload specialists who flew on Space Shuttle missions, giving unique perspective on spaceflight experience from non-career astronauts.	
19	A Long Voyage to the Moon: The Life of Naval Aviator and Apollo 17 Astronaut Ron Evans	Geoffrey Bowman; 2021; ISBN 978-1496228260	Biography of Apollo 17 astronaut Ron Evans, covering his naval aviation career and NASA service on the last lunar mission.	
20	The Light of Earth: Reflections on a Life in Space	Al Worden, Francis French; 2021; ISBN 978-1496229632	Personal reflections on spaceflight experience and the perspective of viewing Earth from space.	
21	Beyond Blue Skies: The Rocket Plane Programs That Led to the Space Age	Chris Petty; 2020; ISBN 978-1496218766	Chronicles the experimental rocket plane programs that preceded the space age, including X-series aircraft and test pilot programs.	
22	Son of Apollo: The Adventures of a Boy Whose Father Went to the Moon	Christopher A. Roosa; 2022; ISBN 978-1496234230	Personal account from the son of Apollo 14 astronaut Stuart Roosa, providing family perspective on the moon missions and growing up in the astronaut community.	
23	Into the Void: Adventures of the Spacewalkers	John Youskauskas, Melvin Croft; 2025; ISBN 978-1496243195	Chronicles the history and personal experiences of spacewalks and extravehicular activities throughout the space program.	
24	Star Bound: A Beginner's Guide to the American Space Program, from Goddard's Rockets to Goldilocks Planets and Everything in Between	Emily Carney, Bruce McCandless III; 2025; ISBN 978-1496242068	Comprehensive beginner's guide to the American space program covering its history from early rockets to modern planetary exploration.	
25	Born to Explore: John Casani's Grand Tour of the Solar System	Jay Gallentine; 2025; ISBN 9781496206657	Biography of NASA engineer John R. Casani who led some of the most historic unmanned missions exploring the solar system.	
