= Jay Gallentine =

American book author

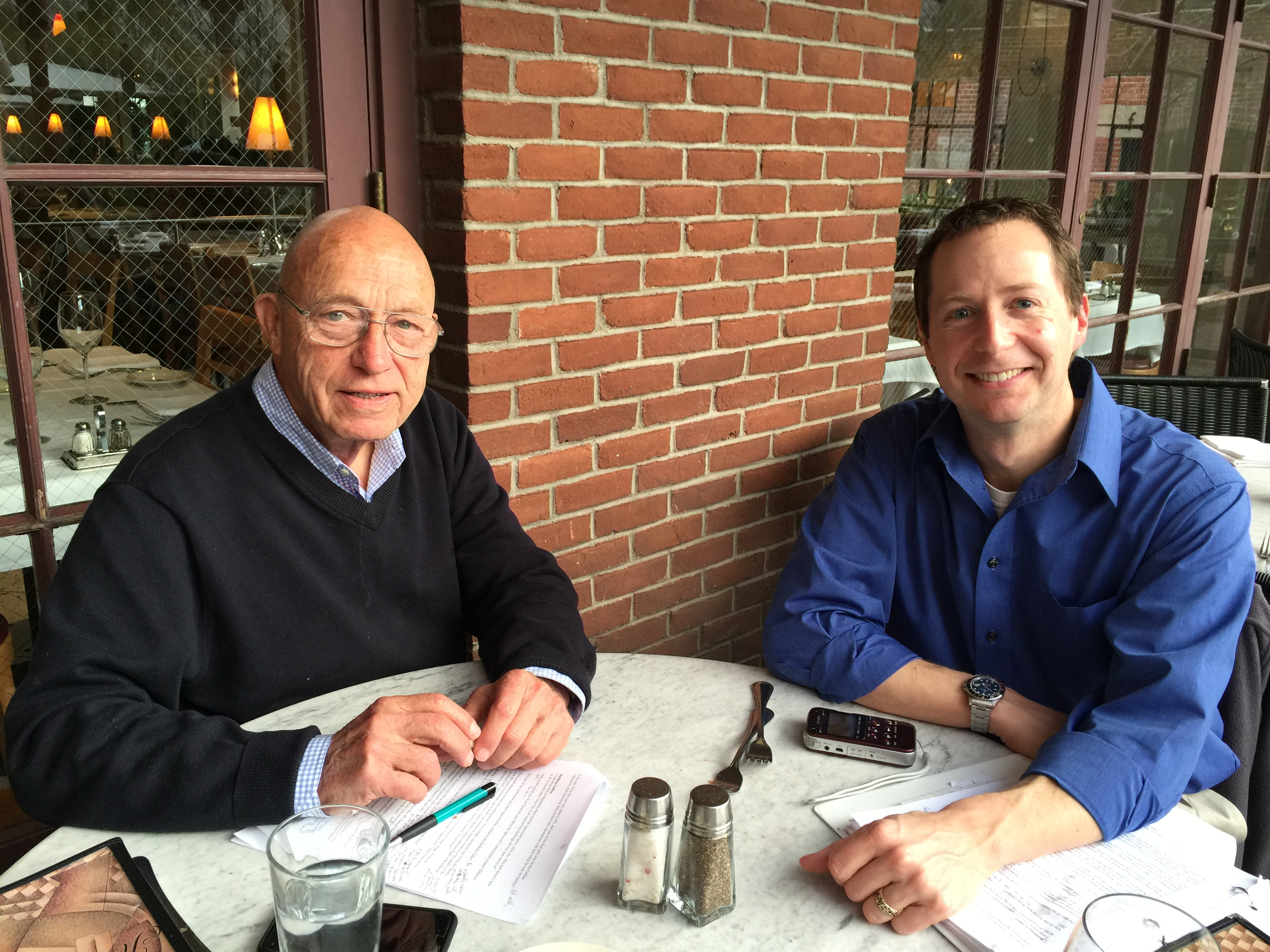
- Jay Gallentine (right) with John Casani
- Born: June 24, 1970 (age 55); Atlantic City, New Jersey, U.S.
- Education: University of Iowa
- Occupations: Author; speaker; filmmaker
- Awards: Eugene M. Emme Award for Astronautical Literature

Jay Gallentine (born June 24, 1970) is an American historian, filmmaker and author specializing in the history of robotic space exploration of the solar system.

Gallentine is author of two books: Ambassadors from Earth: Pioneering Explorations with Unmanned Spacecraft, published in 2009; and Infinity Beckoned: Adventuring Through the Inner Solar System, 1969-1989, published in 2016. Both were published through the University of Nebraska Press' Ordway Award-winning series Outward Odyssey: A People's History of Spaceflight. A third book, titled Born to Explore: John Casani's Grand Tour of the Solar System was published in 2025, also as part of the Outward Odyssey series.

== Background and career ==
Gallentine was born in Atlantic City, New Jersey in 1970, and is a graduate of the University of Iowa.

His film work includes serving as an editorial consultant on HBO's documentary Freestyle: The Victories of Dan Gable and an editor on ABC's Open Sesame: The Making of 'Arabian Nights' and The Quiet Storm, an award-winning documentary on dating violence.

Gallentine is a frequent speaker on spaceflight topics, including at venues including IdeaFestival, Spacefest, Society for Technical Communication, and American Institute of Aeronautics and Astronautics events. He has appeared on Travel Channel's Mysteries at the Museum series, Rod Pyle's Cool Space News podcast and the Space & Things podcast.

== Reception ==
Ambassadors from Earth was the winner of the 2009 AAS Eugene M. Emme Award for Astronautical Literature, given annually to a person or persons selected by a panel of reviewers from the American Astronautical Society History Committee to recognize "the truly outstanding book published each year serving public understanding about the positive impact of astronautics upon society." Ambassadors from Earth became the first Outward Odyssey book to win the Emme Award. A copy of the book also appeared briefly in the pilot episode of the 2017 TV series Ghosted.

American Studies wrote that readers of Ambassadors "will enjoy the glimpses of the very-human excitements and frustrations involved in scientific and technological advance," though noted there were limitations to the book's value in an academic setting.

The National Space Society praised the book, saying "What Tom Wolfe did for the astronauts in The Right Stuff, Gallentine does for robotic explorers in this wonderful book."

Publishers Weekly wrote of that book that "many space buffs, especially young ones, should find this a satisfying narrative" but added that "his use of 'egad' makes it sound as if he just stepped out of The Music Man".

Of Infinity Beckoned, former NASA chief historian and Smithsonian associate director Roger D. Launius wrote for the Oxford University Press that the book makes a contribution to space science literature with his efforts to interview mission participants from both the United States and the Soviet Union.

The United States Air Force's academic publisher Air University Press wrote of Infinity Beckoned that "although Infinity Beckoned is a fine historical work, it is perhaps even better as the expression of hope" and that "as a postmortem on a glorious age of solar system exploration that encourages the glory days ahead, it manages both to inform and excite us."

== Bibliography ==
- Ambassadors from Earth: Pioneering Explorations with Unmanned Spacecraft, 2009
- Infinity Beckoned: Adventuring Through the Inner Solar System, 1969-1989, 2016
- The Last-Ditch, Hail-Mary Attempt to Beat Apollo 11 (Conference Presentation), 2019
- Born to Explore: John Casani's Grand Tour of the Solar System, 2025 (ISBN 978-1496206657)
