= Curt Michel =

American astronaut (1934–2015)

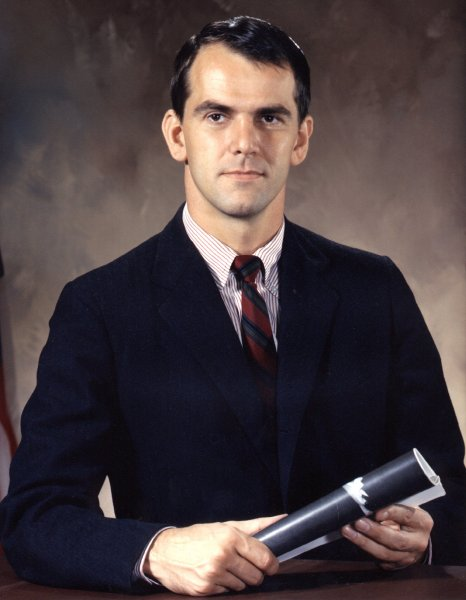
- Michel (c. mid to late 1960s)
- Born: Frank Curtis Michel; June 5, 1934; La Crosse, Wisconsin, U.S.
- Died: February 26, 2015 (aged 80); Houston, Texas, U.S.
- Resting place: Houston National Cemetery
- Education: California Institute of Technology (BS, PhD)
- Awards: Guggenheim Fellow (1979); Humboldt Prize (1983)
- Space career

NASA astronaut
- Selection: NASA Group 4 (1965)
- Retired: August 18, 1969
- Scientific career
- Fields: Astrophysics
- Workplaces: Rice University
- Thesis: The Beta Spectra of the Mass 12 Nuclei (1962)
- Doctoral advisor: Thomas Lauritsen

Frank Curtis Michel (June 5, 1934 – February 26, 2015) was an American astrophysicist; a professor of astrophysics at Rice University in Houston, Texas; a United States Air Force pilot; and a NASA astronaut.

== Personal life ==
Michel was born June 5, 1934, to parents to Frank and Viola Michel. He was married to Bonnie Hausman, a web technical specialist. He had two children, Alice and Jeff with his first wife Beverly, who preceded him in death, and three grandchildren. His hobbies were photography, tennis, handball, and baseball. Michel died at the age of 80 on February 26, 2015. He was buried with full military honors at the Houston National Cemetery.

== Education ==
Michel graduated from C. K. McClatchy High School, located at Sacramento, California, in 1951. In 1955, he received a Bachelor of Science degree with honors in physics, and in 1962 he received a doctorate in physics, both from the California Institute of Technology. His thesis was "Beta Spectra of the Mass 12 Nuclei" and his dissertation advisor was Thomas Lauritsen. Nobel laureate William Alfred Fowler also served on his committee.

While on the faculty of Rice University, Michel oversaw the dissertations of Jerry Modisette, Robert LaQuey, Robert Manka, Cliff Morris, Michael Pelizzari, Jürgen Krause-Polstorff, James Sokolowski, and Steven Sturner.

== Organizations ==
Michel was a fellow of the American Physical Society and a member of the American Geophysical Union, and the American Astronomical Society.

== Experience ==
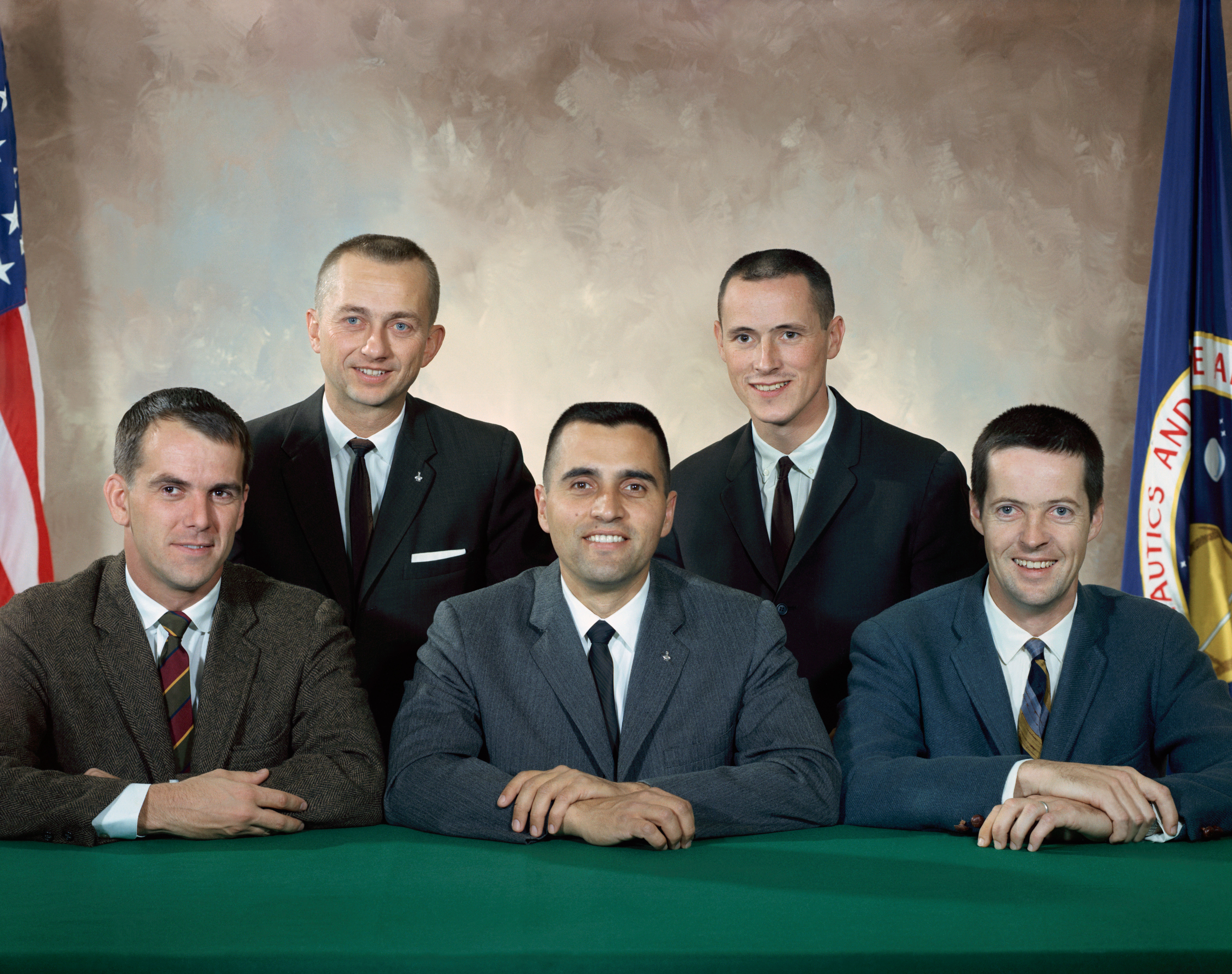
Michel, seated front left, with NASA Astronaut Group 4

Michel was a junior engineer with the Firestone Tire and Rubber Company's guided missile division before joining the Air Force in 1955. As an Air Force Reserve Officer Training Corps (AFROTC) graduate, he received flight training at Marana Air Force Base, Arizona, and at Laredo Air Force Base and Perrin Air Force Base in Texas. During his three years of military service, Michel flew F-86D interceptors in the United States and in Europe (England and West Germany). Michel accumulated 1,000 hours flying time with 900 hours in jet aircraft.

Following his tour of active duty in the United States Air Force, Michel was a graduate student and research fellow at the California Institute of Technology, doing experimental and theoretical work in nuclear physics for Lauritsen and Richard P. Feynman, along with work in theoretical astrophysics for Fowler.

He joined the faculty of Rice University in Houston, Texas in July 1963. Michel's efforts there were directed at researching and teaching space sciences, such as the interaction of the solar wind with the lunar atmosphere.

Michel was selected as a scientist-astronaut in NASA Astronaut Group 4 in June 1965. He resigned from NASA on August 18, 1969 without having been assigned to any spaceflight missions. Michel believed that it was his decision to resign (after it became clear that he would not be given a flight assignment) that motivated the scientific community to demand that his fellow scientist-astronaut Harrison Schmitt be reassigned to Apollo 17 (replacing Joe Engle) after Schmitt's planned mission on Apollo 18 was cancelled.

After his resignation from NASA, Michel returned to teaching and research at Rice, where he also served as chair of the space physics and astronomy department from 1974 to 1979. He was the Andrew Hays Buchanan Professor of Astrophysics from 1974 until his retirement in 2000. Michel was named a Guggenheim Fellow to the École Polytechnique in Palaiseau, France, from 1979 to 1980, and was awarded a Humboldt Prize to study in Heidelberg at the Max Planck Institute for Nuclear Physics, in West Germany, from 1983 to 1984. Following his retirement, Michel spent the 2001–2002 academic year in Japan at the Solar-Terrestrial Environment Laboratory of the University of Nagoya as a visiting professor.

== Research ==
Michel's research spanned many disciplines. In 1964, he predicted the existence of spin "optical rotation" due to parity nonconserving weak interactions. This phenomenon was experimentally confirmed in 1980 and is used to study parity nonconserving weak interactions between neutrons and nuclei. Michel is best known for his work on pulsars and neutron star magnetospheres but his work also included solar wind interactions with the Moon and other bodies, extending to the heliopause. In 2000, Michel officially retired from Rice but he continued to be active in research until his death in 2015.

== Books ==
- Michel is the author of the book Theory of Neutron Star Magnetospheres, University of Chicago Press, 1990 ISBN 9780226523316.
- Michel is the author of the book Handbook of High-Energy Astrophysics Experiments, Springer Verlag, 2015 ISBN 9781441965288 .
- Michel was a contributor to the book NASA's Scientist-Astronauts by David Shayler and Colin Burgess, Springer Praxis, 2007 ISBN 9780387218977

== See also ==
- The Astronaut Monument
