= David Hitt =

American author (born 1975)

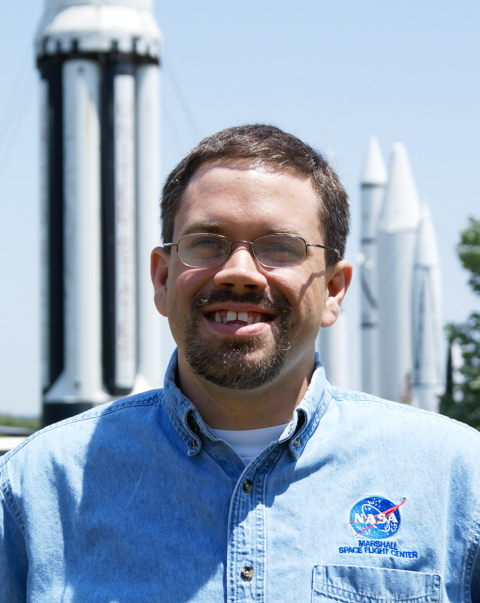
- David Hitt
- Born: William David Hitt; August 7, 1975 (age 51); Huntsville, Alabama, United States
- Education: University of Mississippi
- Occupation: Writer
- Writing career
- Period: 2008–present
- Genre: Science
- Website: davidhitt.net

William David Hitt is an American author specializing in spaceflight history.

Hitt is co-author of Homesteading Space: The Skylab Story, a history of the Skylab program, with NASA astronauts Owen K. Garriott and Joseph Kerwin. Homesteading Space was published in 2008 by the University of Nebraska Press as part of its Outward Odyssey: A People's History of Spaceflight series. Hitt's second book, Bold They Rise: The Space Shuttle Early Years, 1972–1986, also part of the Outward Odyssey series, was published in June 2014.

Homesteading Space was reviewed in the Spring 2009 edition of the National Space Society's Ad Astra magazine, by Rick Sturdivant in Air Power History in Spring 2010, by Roger Lanius in the January 2009 issue of Air & Space Smithsonian Magazine, and by the American Library Association's Booklist in November 2008. It was reviewed also in the Fall/Winter 2009 edition of "Faith & Family Matters" magazine.

== Education and background ==
Hitt was born in 1975 in Huntsville, Alabama. He graduated from Huntsville High School in 1992; received a B.A. in Journalism from University of Mississippi in 1996.

== Career ==
Hitt was a reporter and news editor of The Enterprise-Tocsin, a weekly newspaper in Indianola, Mississippi, from August 1996 until October 1998, and from October 1999 until August 2002. He was employed by Boone Newspapers in Mississippi from 1998 to 1999.

In 2002 Hitt joined the NASA Educational Technology Services web team at NASA's Marshall Space Flight Center in Huntsville, Alabama. In 2012 he joined the Strategic Communications team supporting NASA's Space Launch System.

He has been a volunteer at the U.S. Space & Rocket Center since 2005 and has served as a Policy Committee Member on the National Space Society since 2008. He frequently participates in book signings and gives public talks related to the Skylab program.

Hitt was an actor with Face2Face Improv, Inc. from 2006 to 2012. He is co-founder and director of Comic Science Improv.
