= Duane Graveline =

American physician and astronaut (1931–2016)

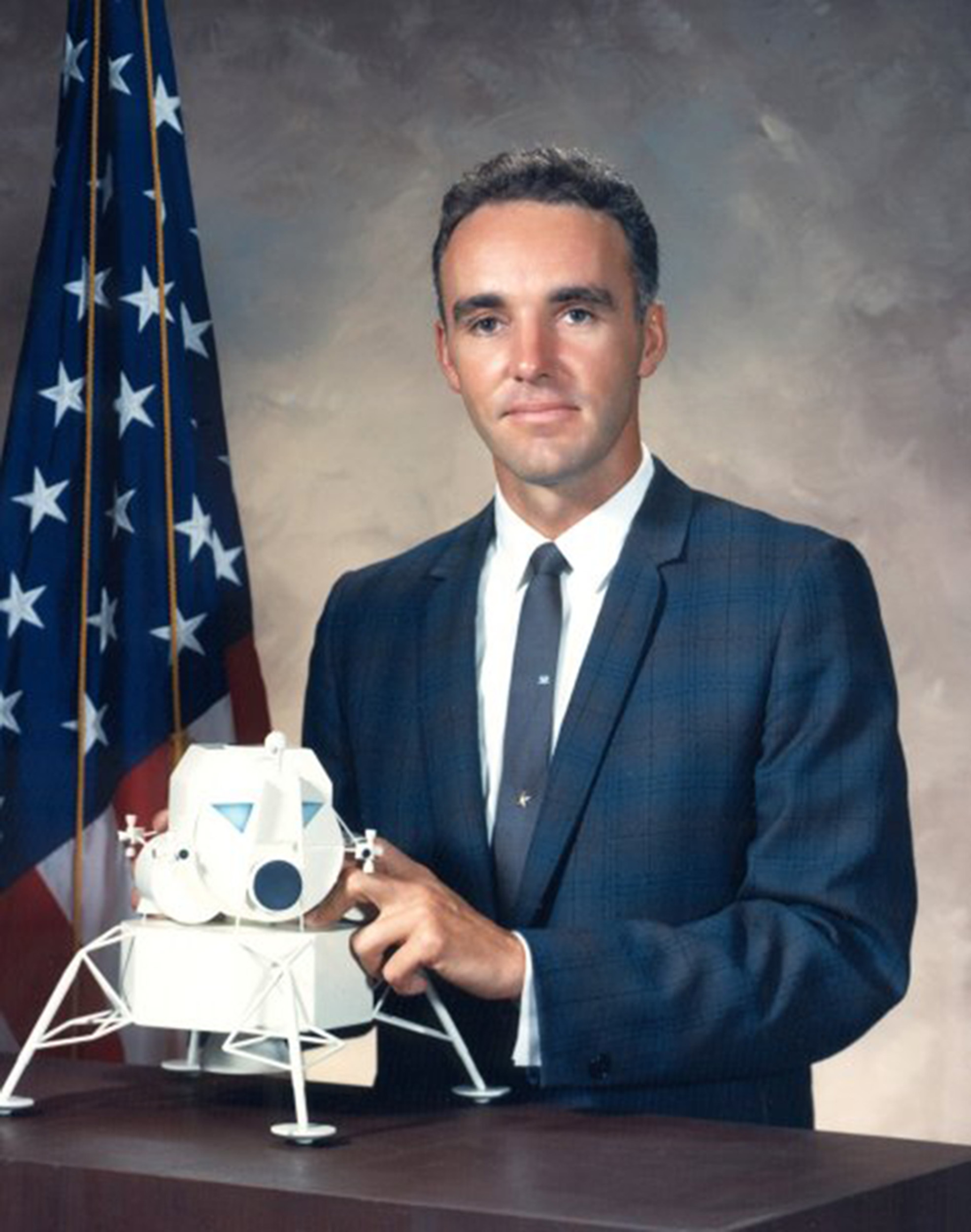
- Born: Duane Edgar Graveline; March 2, 1931; Newport, Vermont, U.S.
- Died: September 5, 2016 (aged 85); Merritt Island, Florida, U.S.
- Resting place: Arlington National Cemetery
- Education: University of Vermont (BS, MD); Johns Hopkins University (MPH)
- Space career

NASA astronaut
- Rank: Major, USAF; Colonel, USA
- Selection: NASA Group 4 (1965)

Duane Edgar "Doc" Graveline (March 2, 1931 – September 5, 2016) was an American physician and NASA astronaut. He was one of the six scientists selected in 1965, in NASA's fourth group of astronauts, for the Apollo program. He was best known for being immersed in water for seven days as part of his zero gravity deconditioning research while working as a United States Air Force (USAF) research scientist.

== Personal life ==
Graveline was born on March 2, 1931, in Newport, Vermont. His hobbies included medical consulting in microgravity deconditioning and galactic cosmic radiation and personal health maintenance.

== Education ==
Graveline graduated from Newport High School in 1948. He received his Bachelor of Science degree from the University of Vermont in 1951 and his Doctor of Medicine degree from the University of Vermont College of Medicine in 1955. Following his internship at Walter Reed, he specialized in aerospace medicine, receiving his Masters in Public Health degree from Johns Hopkins University in 1958.

Graveline married a total of six times. One former wife, who asked that she not be identified, said to The New York Times: “It is a long and sad, sad story — a brilliant, brilliant man who was deeply flawed".

Following his experience with cholesterol drug side effects, Graveline became a critic of the use of statins to treat high cholesterol levels. While on Lipitor, Graveline developed transient global amnesia and could not recognize his family. He slowly recovered after stopping this medication. NASA physicians then prescribed half the dose, but the amnesia returned.

Dr. Duane Graveline died at the age of 85 on September 5, 2016. His ashes were interred on 3rd May, 2017 in Section: 76 Grave: 1046 at Arlington National Cemetery with full military honors.

== Career ==
Graveline entered the United States Air Force Medical Service after graduation from medical college. Following internship he attended the primary course in Aviation Medicine, Class 56C, at Randolph Air Force Base and was assigned to Kelly Air Force Base as Chief of the Aviation Medicine Service.

Graveline was granted the aeronautical rating of flight surgeon in February 1957. From September 1957 to June 1958, he attended Johns Hopkins School of Hygiene and Public Health, where he received his master's degree in Public Health.

He then attended the Aerospace Medical residency at the Air Force School of Aerospace Medicine, completing his residency training in July 1960 at Brooks Air Force Base and receiving his specialty certification by the American Board in Preventative Medicine. At that time he was assigned to the Aerospace Medical Research Laboratory as research scientist with special interest in prolonged weightlessness deconditioning and countermeasures. In July 1962, he returned to Brooks Air Force Base where he continued his research, served as intelligence analyst for Soviet bioastronautics and was active as a NASA flight controller for the Mercury and Gemini missions.

Graveline authored ten professional publications and reports on biological deconditioning and weightlessness countermeasures. His research involved bed rest and water immersion to study deconditioning. While in the USAF he did the original research on both the extremity tourniquet and the prototype lower body negative pressure device for use in prolonged zero gravity missions. NASA's operational lower body negative pressure device has seen use in the Soviet MIR, as well as on the shuttle and station research. His 2004 research on space medicine was studying the effect of galactic "heavies" in the brains of mice, using iron ions and NASA's linear accelerator at Brookhaven, NY.

In June 1965, Graveline was selected with NASA's first group of scientist astronauts and assigned to Williams Air Force Base for jet pilot training. He resigned on August 18, 1965, prior to flying in space. He was the first astronaut to resign prior to being assigned a mission. Although this was ascribed to "personal reasons," it was later disclosed in Deke Slayton's memoir that Graveline resigned due to his impending divorce. According to Slayton, "The program didn't need a scandal. A messy divorce meant a quick ticket back to wherever you came from." His wife Carol had stated in the court papers that her husband had "violent and ungovernable outbursts of temper."

== Post-astronautics career ==
Upon his resignation, Graveline stayed with NASA for three months as a doctor in Houston before returning to civilian life. For nearly 20 years, Graveline practiced medicine as a family doctor in Burlington, Vermont, during which time he also served as a flight surgeon for the Vermont Army National Guard. Graveline took a leave of absence from his medical practice in 1981 to once again take a position at NASA. At the dawn of the Space Shuttle era, Dr. Graveline served as the Director of Medical Operations at Kennedy Space Center (KSC) for the first four Space Shuttle launches. In 1987, the Vermont Board of Medical Practice suspended his license after he was unable to account for "a large number of pills of the narcotic Demerol". He continued practicing medicine during his appeal, culminating in the restoration of his license following remedial action in 1989. However, the state permanently revoked his license in 1994, this time over allegations that he had sexually abused five children who were not among his patients. He waived his right to further proceedings and ceased practicing medicine, later noting in an online biography that he "retired from medical practice at the age of 63".

Thereafter, Graveline became a writer of medical and science fiction thrillers, ultimately authoring 15 fiction books (all of which were self-published) during his retirement.

Graveline was a contributor to the 2006 book NASA's Scientist-Astronauts by David Shayler and Colin Burgess.
