= Aldo da Rosa =

American academic (1917–2015)

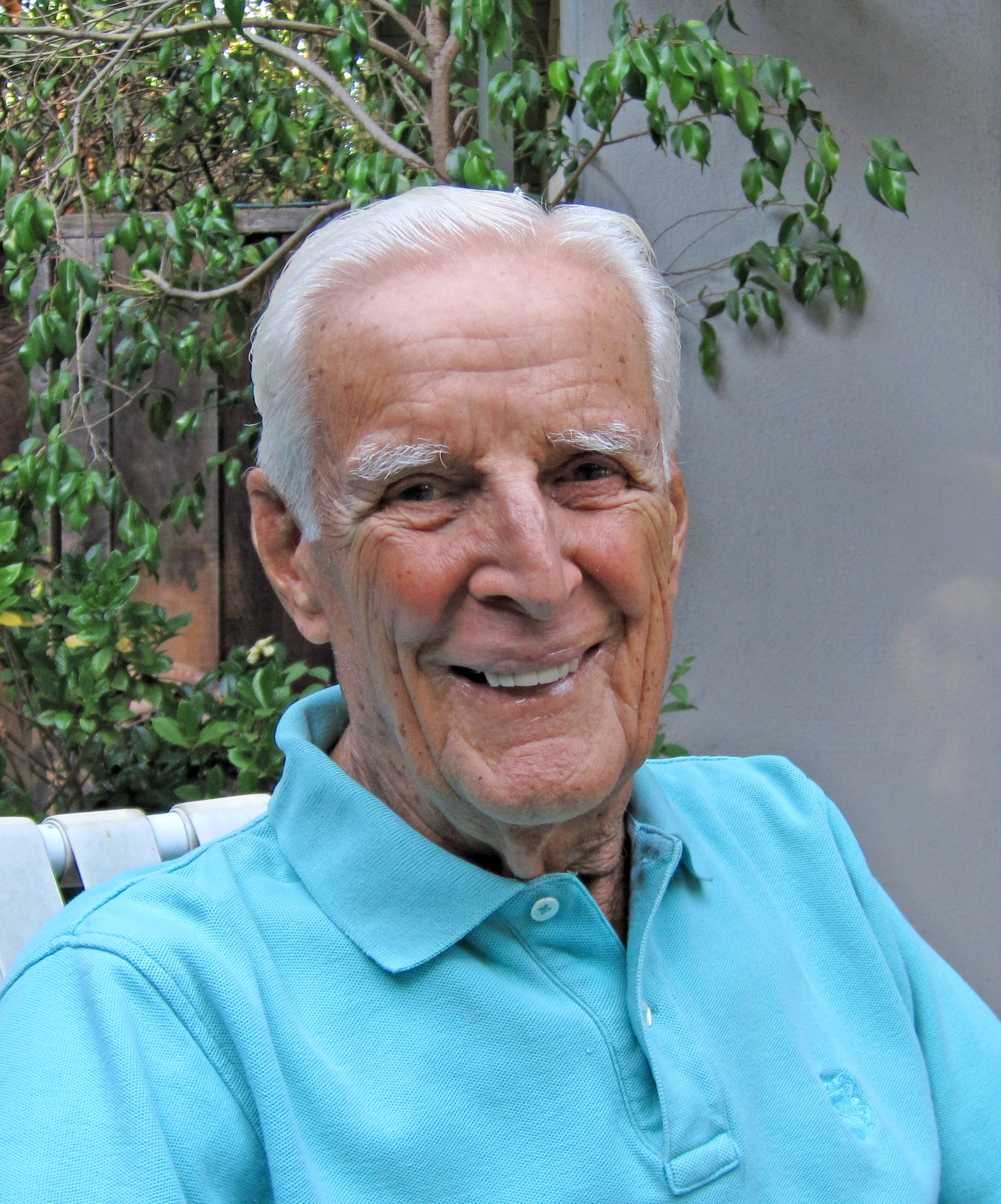
- Da Rosa in 2009
- Born: November 15, 1917; Florianópolis, Brazil
- Died: June 8, 2015 (aged 97); Palo Alto, California, USA
- Education: Stanford University
- Spouse: Aili Ranta (m. 1944)
- Awards: Grand Cross of the National Order of Scientific Merit
- Military career
- Allegiance: Brazil
- Branch: Air Force
- Rank: Brigadier General

Aldo Weber Vieira da Rosa (November 15, 1917 – June 8, 2015) was a professor emeritus of electrical engineering at Stanford University. His research interests were in ionospheric processes, energy processes and renewable energy. He authored Fundamentals of Electronics (1989) and Fundamentals of Renewable Energy Processes (2005). His patent for the process for the production of ammonia expired in 1996.

== Biography ==
Da Rosa was born in Florianópolis, Brazil. After graduating from the Brazilian Military Academy and the Military School of Realengo both in Rio de Janeiro, he entered the Brazilian Air Force. During the 1940s, he was stationed in Washington, D.C., USA and later at Alameda Naval Air Station in the San Francisco Bay Area. He had the opportunity to attend Stanford University while in California; despite not having an undergraduate degree, his technical experience enabled him to be admitted into the electrical engineering graduate program. He finished this degree in 1944 and moved to Harvard University before returning to Brazil the following year. He returned to Stanford to earn his PhD in electrical engineering, which he did so under Owen K. Garriott. He completed the degree in 1966, his research focusing on a full-physics model of the electron distribution in the ionosphere.

For the next twenty years, da Rosa was active in the nascent aerospace industry in Brazil, while still attached to the Brazilian Air Force. Between 1945 and 1951, he served as the first head of the research and standardization division of the Department of Airspace Control's Air Routes Directorate. In 1952 and 1953, he was associate professor of electronics in the Instituto Tecnológico de Aeronáutica's engineering faculty in São José dos Campos. He founded and was the first director of the Instituto de Pesquinas e Desenvolvimento (Institute of Research and Development) in 1954. In 1956, he was chairman of the Brazilian National Research Council but resigned following an injury sustained while gliding in France. He was the first chairman of the National Institute for Space Research from its inception in 1961 to 1963.

In the early 1960s, da Rosa was a helicopter test pilot for the Beija Flor, a helicopter designed by Heinrich Focke. He retired from the Air Force as Brigadier General in 1965. At Stanford in 1966, he became a research associate, then senior research associate in 1968. In 1980, he became a professor of electrical engineering, lecturing on topics of renewable energy with an emphasis on classical physics. He formally retired from teaching in 1983 but continued lecturing on energy processes until 2011. Da Rosa was awarded the Grand Cross of the National Order of Scientific Merit in March 2010.

== Personal life ==
An active masters swimmer, da Rosa broke 99 national records and 44 world records in masters swimming. He currently still holds the world records in the 85-89 age group in the 200 meter IM and 200 meter breast stroke. He was inducted into the International Masters Swimming Hall of Fame in 2004.

Da Rosa married fellow Stanford University student Aili Ranta in 1944. He died in Palo Alto, California at the age of 97 on June 8, 2015.

== Sources ==
- Stanford Bio Page
- Stories About USMS Swimmers
