= Warren J. North =

Warren North
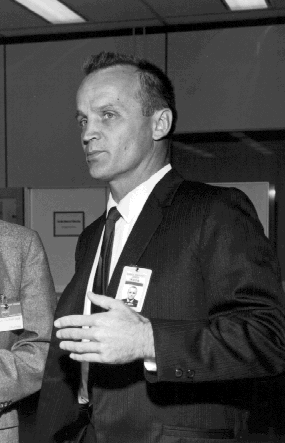
- Warren North at the Manned Spacecraft Center on 14 October 1964
- Born: 28 April 1922
- Died: 10 April 2012 (aged 89)
- Education: Purdue University (BS, 1947); Case Institute of Technology (MS, 1954); Princeton University (MS, 1957)
- Occupations: test pilot, aeronautical engineer
- Awards: NASA Exceptional Service Medal

Warren J. North (28 April 1922 – 10 April 2012) was an American test pilot and aeronautical engineer. He trained fighter pilots during World War II. After the war he studied aeronautical engineering and became a test pilot. He was Chief of the Flight Crew Operations Division from 1962 to 1971, and Assistant Director for Space Shuttle, Flight Operations Directorate at the NASA Manned Spacecraft Center in Houston, Texas, from 1971 to 1985.

== Biography ==
Warren J. North was born on 28 April 1922. He entered the University of Illinois, where he studied mechanical engineering, and enlisted in the Reserve Officer Training Corps (ROTC), in 1940. Before he could graduate, he was drafted into the US Army in 1943, given the rank of sergeant, and sent to Fort Leonard Wood, Missouri, for basic training in the United States Army Corps of Engineers, and then to Fort Belvoir, Virginia, for its Officer Candidate School (OCS).

North was offered an opportunity to transfer to the United States Army Air Forces (USAAF), and did so. He was commissioned as a second lieutenant in November 1944, qualifying as a fighter pilot at Foster Field, in Victoria, Texas. He was posted to Randolph Field, Texas, as an instructor, teaching trainee pilots to fly the AT-6. Fighter pilots were no longer in demand by this time, so the USAAF decided to retrain him as a bomber pilot, on the B-17 Flying Fortress, and the B-29 Superfortress.

Separated from the USAAF after the war ended, North returned to his studies, but this time to Purdue University, as he now wanted to study aeronautical engineering. He graduated from Purdue with his Bachelor of Science degree in 1947, and took a job with the National Advisory Committee for Aeronautics (NACA) at its Lewis Research Laboratory in Ohio, where he served as an aeronautical engineer and test pilot. He flew various aircraft there, including the P-51 Mustang, P-61 Black Widow, F-82 Twin Mustang, B-24 Liberator, B-25 Mitchell and B-29 Superfortress.

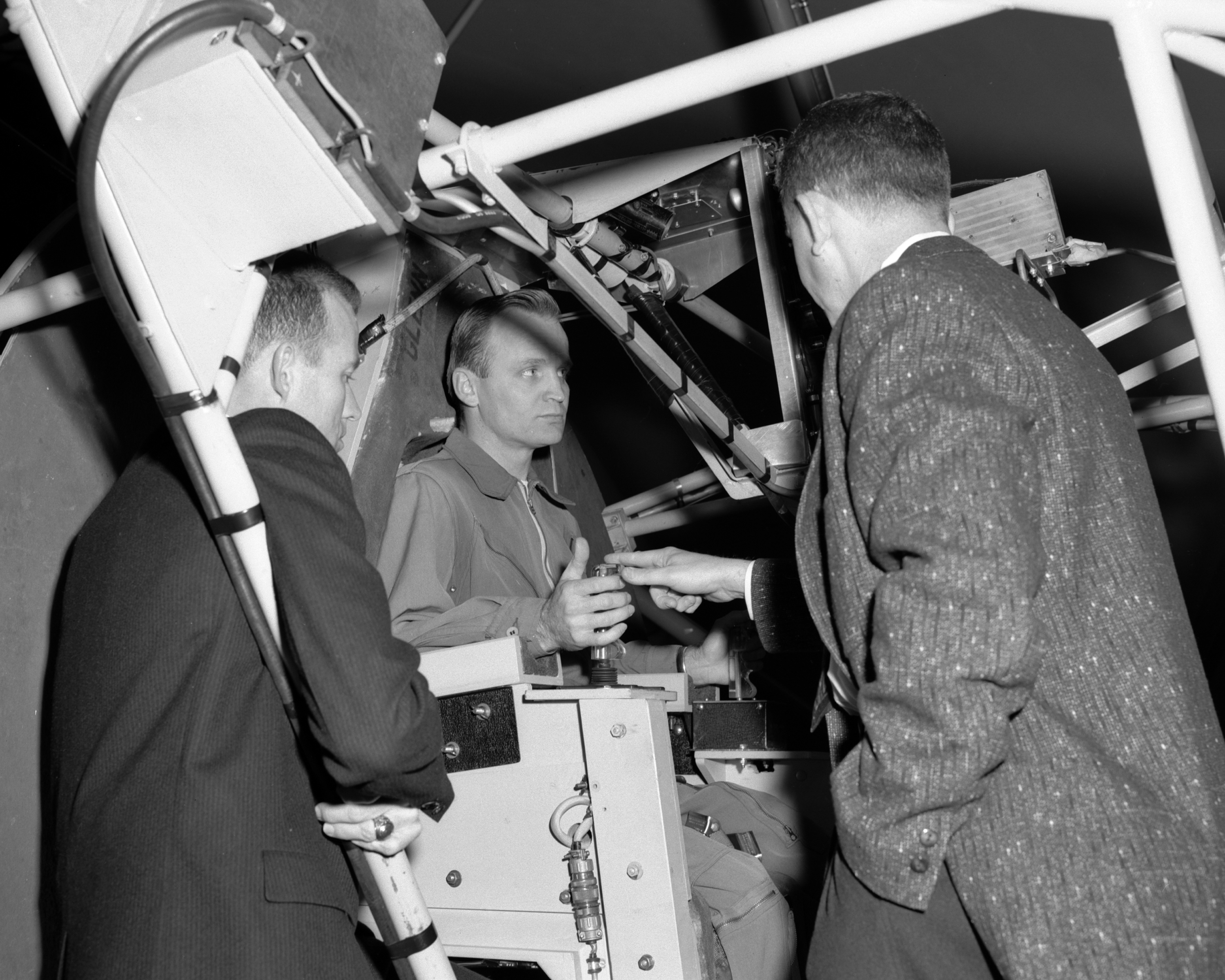
North (in chair) and astronaut Gordon Cooper testing the gimbaling rig in the Altitude Wind Tunnel at NASA Lewis Research Center in Ohio.

North attended night school at Case Institute of Technology, from which he received a Master of Science degree in theoretical aeronautical engineering in 1955. He was then awarded an American Institute of Aeronautics and Astronautics fellowship to study at Princeton University, earning a second Master of Science degree in applied aeronautical engineering in 1957. He was Assistant Chief of the Aerodynamics Noise Branch from 1955 to 1959.

The National Aeronautics and Space Administration (NASA) absorbed NACA when it was formed in 1958, and North was selected to interview and evaluate the astronauts who became the Mercury Seven. He was transferred to Robert R. Gilruth's Space Task Group at the Langley Research Center in Virginia, and moved to the Manned Spacecraft Center (MSC) in Houston, Texas, where he was Chief of the Flight Crew Operations Division from 1962 to 1971.

North participated in the selection of the second, third, fourth and fifth groups of astronauts, and oversaw the development of simulators for astronaut training. His division consisted of about three hundred people, who were divided into three groups: Simulation, Crew Integration, and Flight Planning. He was awarded the NASA Exceptional Service Medal in 1969. From 1971 to 1985, he was the Assistant Director for Space Shuttle. North retired from NASA in 1985. He built his own plane and continued to fly. His aunt, Romalda Spalding, the author of the Spalding Method, a method of teaching children to read, asked him to establish a non-profit foundation to educate teachers in her method. This would occupy him for the next 26 years.

North died on 10 April 2012. He was survived by his wife Mary, and children, James, Mary, and Susan.
