= Bold They Rise =

- Front cover of US first hardcover edition
- Author: David Hitt; Heather R. Smith
- Language: English
- Genre: Science
- Publisher: University of Nebraska Press
- Publication date: July 2014
- Publication place: United States
- Media type: Print (Hardcover)
- Pages: 352 pp (hardcover)
- ISBN: 9780803226487 (hardcover edition)
- Followed by: Wheels Stop

Bold They Rise: The Space Shuttle Early Years (1972-1986) is a 2014 non-fiction book by David Hitt and Heather R. Smith. Bold They Rise tells the story of the Space Shuttle through the personal experiences of the astronauts, engineers, and scientists who made it happen—in space and on the ground, from the days of research and design through the heroic accomplishments of the program to the tragic last minutes of the Space Shuttle Challenger disaster.

The book is part of the Outward Odyssey spaceflight history series by the University of Nebraska Press.

The book title is based on a poem by space historian Colin Burgess.
