= Joseph P. Kerwin =

American astronaut and physician (born 1932)

Joseph Kerwin
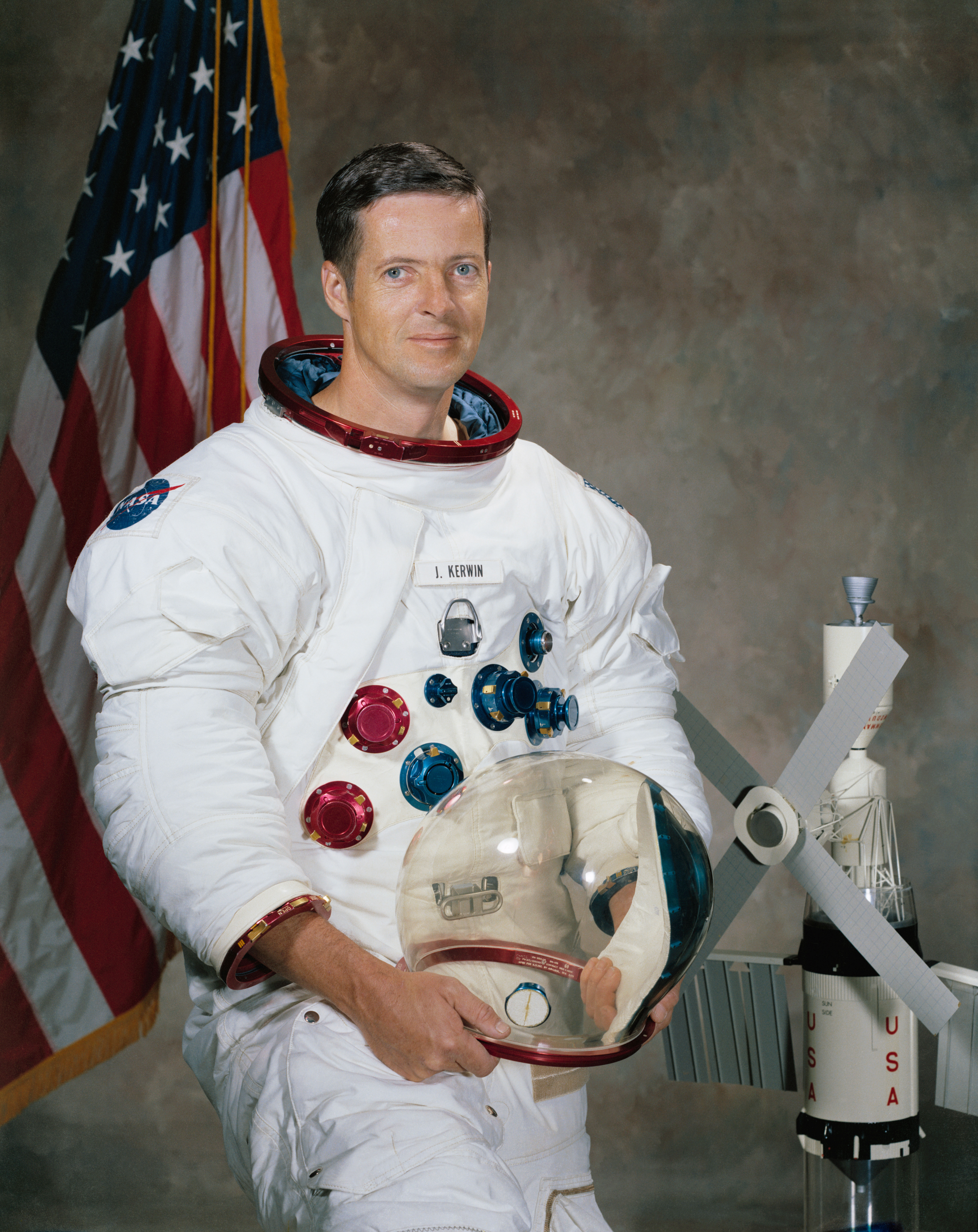
- Kerwin in 1971
- Born: Joseph Peter Kerwin; February 19, 1932 (age 94); Oak Park, Illinois, U.S.
- Education: College of the Holy Cross (BA); Northwestern University (MD)
- Awards: NASA Distinguished Service Medal (1973)
- Space career

NASA astronaut
- Rank: Captain, USN
- Time in space: 28d 0h 50m
- Selection: NASA Group 4 (1965)
- Total EVAs: 1
- Total EVA time: 3h 23m
- Missions: Skylab 2
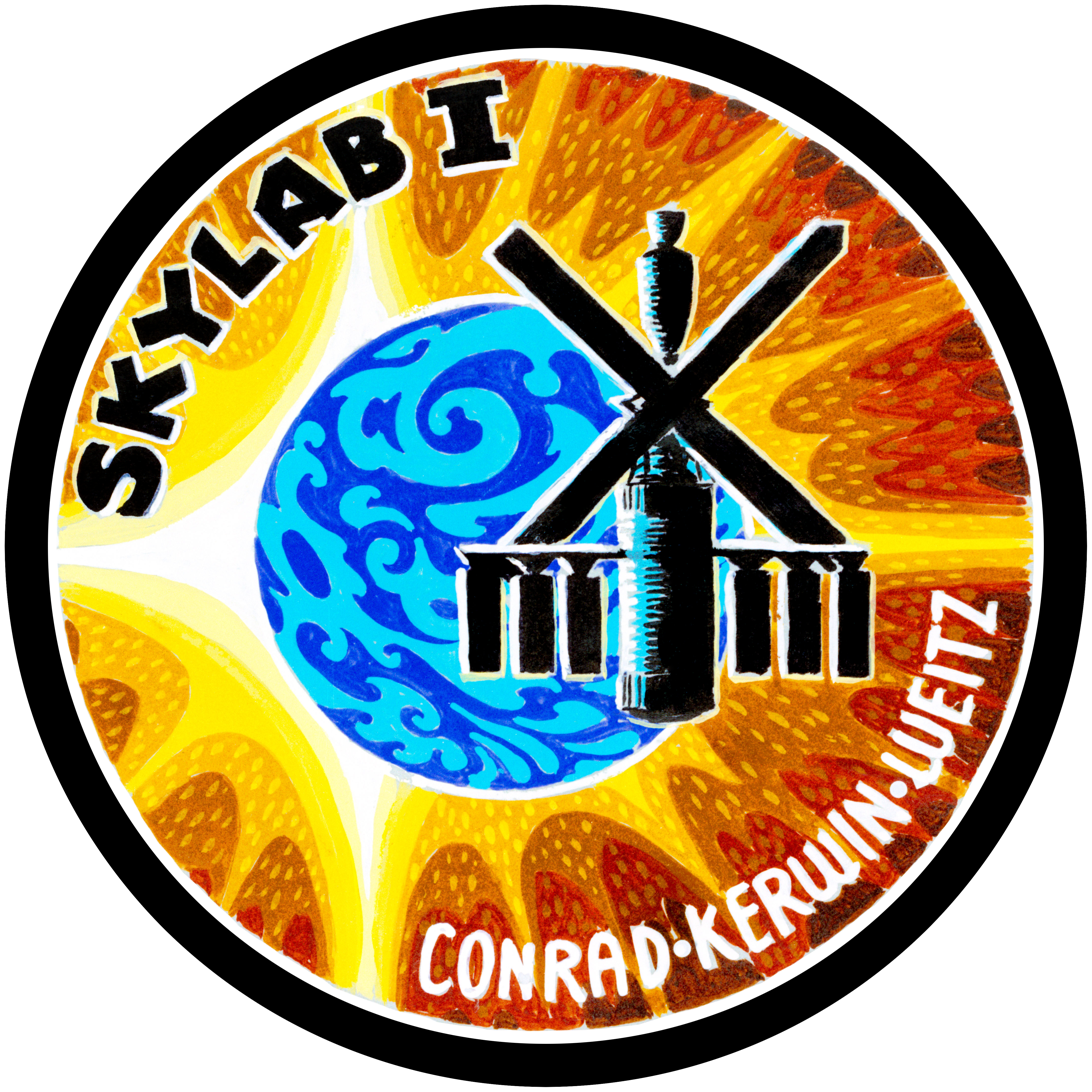
- Mission insignia
- Retired: March 31, 1987

Joseph Peter Kerwin (born February 19, 1932) is an American physician and former NASA astronaut. He served as the science pilot for the Skylab 2 mission from May 25, 1973, to June 22, 1973. He was the first physician to be selected for astronaut training and the first doctor from the United States to enter space.

Kerwin was the one who uttered the words during Apollo 13: "Farewell, Aquarius, and we thank you." He was inducted into the United States Astronaut Hall of Fame in 1997.

== Early life and education ==
Joseph Peter Kerwin was born on February 19, 1932, in Oak Park, Illinois, a suburb of Chicago, and was the seventh child in his family. His father was the senior vice president of E.J. Brach and Sons, a confectionery. Two of his older brothers served in the military during World War II. He graduated from Fenwick High School, a Dominican preparatory school where he learned Latin and German, in 1949.

After high school, Kerwin enrolled at the College of the Holy Cross in Worcester, Massachusetts, and graduated in 1953 with a Bachelor of Arts degree, magna cum laude, in philosophy and pre-medical studies, ranked eighth in his class. During his junior year at Holy Cross, he won a national rhyme contest involving Lucky Strike cigarettes. In his final year, he wrote a senior thesis titled, Psychological Aspects of Competitive Swimming.

In 1957, Kerwin earned his Doctor of Medicine (M.D.) from Northwestern University at the Feinberg School of Medicine. After medical school, he completed an internship at District of Columbia General Hospital in Washington, D.C. During his internship, he was selected for military service through the contemporary physicians' draft system and assigned to the United States Navy. After his internship, he attended the U.S. Navy School of Aviation Medicine.

== Military service ==
Kerwin entered the U.S. Navy Medical Corps in July 1958. He was designated a naval flight surgeon in December 1958. In 1959, he was assigned to the United States Marine Corps at Marine Corps Air Station Cherry Point in North Carolina, where he served for two years as flight surgeon for Marine Aircraft Group 14. Kerwin later served as flight surgeon for Fighter Squadron 101 at Naval Air Station Oceana in Virginia and subsequently as staff flight surgeon for Air Wing 4 at Naval Air Station Cecil Field in Florida.

During his assignment with the Marines, Kerwin became interested in flying and applied to a U.S. Navy program that provided full flight training to a small number of flight surgeons. He was accepted into the program and entered U.S. Navy flight training in 1961, transferring from the U.S. Naval Reserve. He completed flight training at Chase Field in Beeville, Texas, in 1962, qualified as a naval aviator, and was named the most outstanding student in his preflight class.

Following flight training, Kerwin was assigned to an air wing at Cecil Field, where two of the naval aviators he encountered were future astronauts Jim Lovell and Alan Bean. Kerwin later recalled that both men asked him, in his capacity as a physician, to assist them with the medical paperwork for their astronaut applications.

Kerwin remained an officer in the Navy Medical Corps during his career at NASA, ultimately attaining the rank of captain. He retired from the Navy in 1987, the same year that he left NASA. By 2002, he had accumulated approximately 4,500 hours of flying time.

== NASA career ==
Kerwin was selected for NASA Astronaut Group 4 as a scientist-astronaut in June 1965. He was serving as a pilot and a flight surgeon for the Navy at the time of his selection. He was one of the capsule communicators (CAPCOMs) on Apollo 13 (in 1970).

Kerwin served as Science Pilot for the Skylab 2 (SL-2) mission which launched on May 25 and splashed down on June 22, 1973. With him for the initial activation and 28-day flight qualification operations of the Skylab Orbital Workshop were Charles "Pete" Conrad (spacecraft commander) and Paul J. Weitz (Pilot).

Kerwin was subsequently in charge of the on-orbit branch of the Astronaut Office, where he coordinated astronaut activity involving rendezvous, satellite deployment and retrieval, and other Space Shuttle payload operations. Kerwin was part of the NBC broadcasting team for coverage of the launch of STS-1.

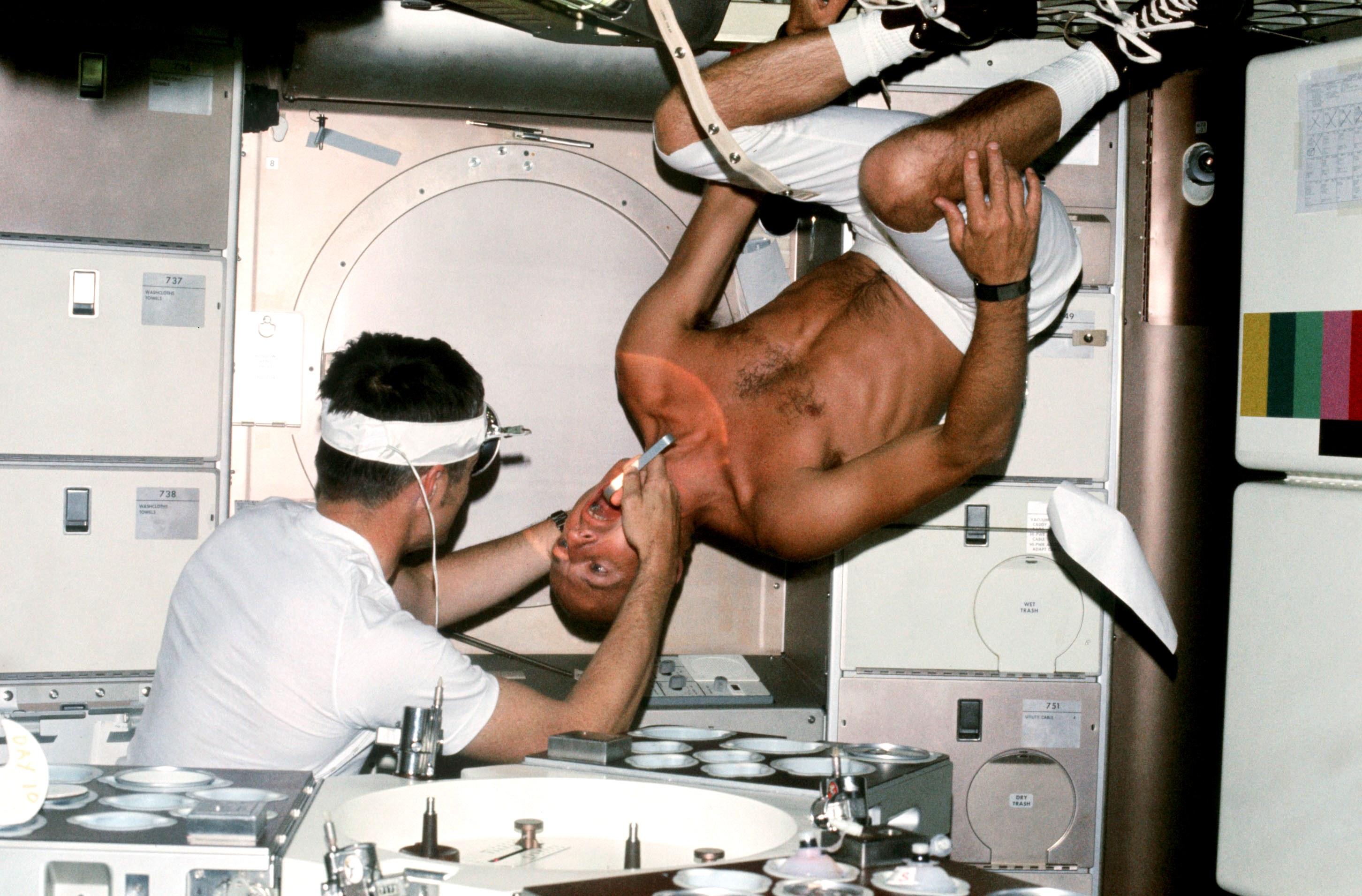
Kerwin administers dental exam to Skylab 2 Commander Charles "Pete" Conrad

From 1982–83, Kerwin served as NASA's senior science representative in Australia. In this capacity, he served as liaison between NASA's Office of Space Tracking and Data Systems and Australia's Commonwealth Scientific and Industrial Research Organisation. During this time, Kerwin was considered to fly on the mission that would become STS-41-C (then known as STS-13), but his assignment in Australia prevented his selection.

From 1984–1987, Kerwin served as Director of Space and Life Sciences at the Johnson Space Center. There, he was responsible for direction and coordination of medical support to operational crewed spacecraft programs, including health care and maintenance of the astronauts and their families; for direction of life services, supporting research and light experiment project; and for managing JSC earth sciences and scientific efforts in lunar and planetary research. In 1986, he issued a report on the deaths of the crew killed in the Challenger disaster to Associate Administrator for Space Flight, Richard H. Truly.

== Post-NASA career ==
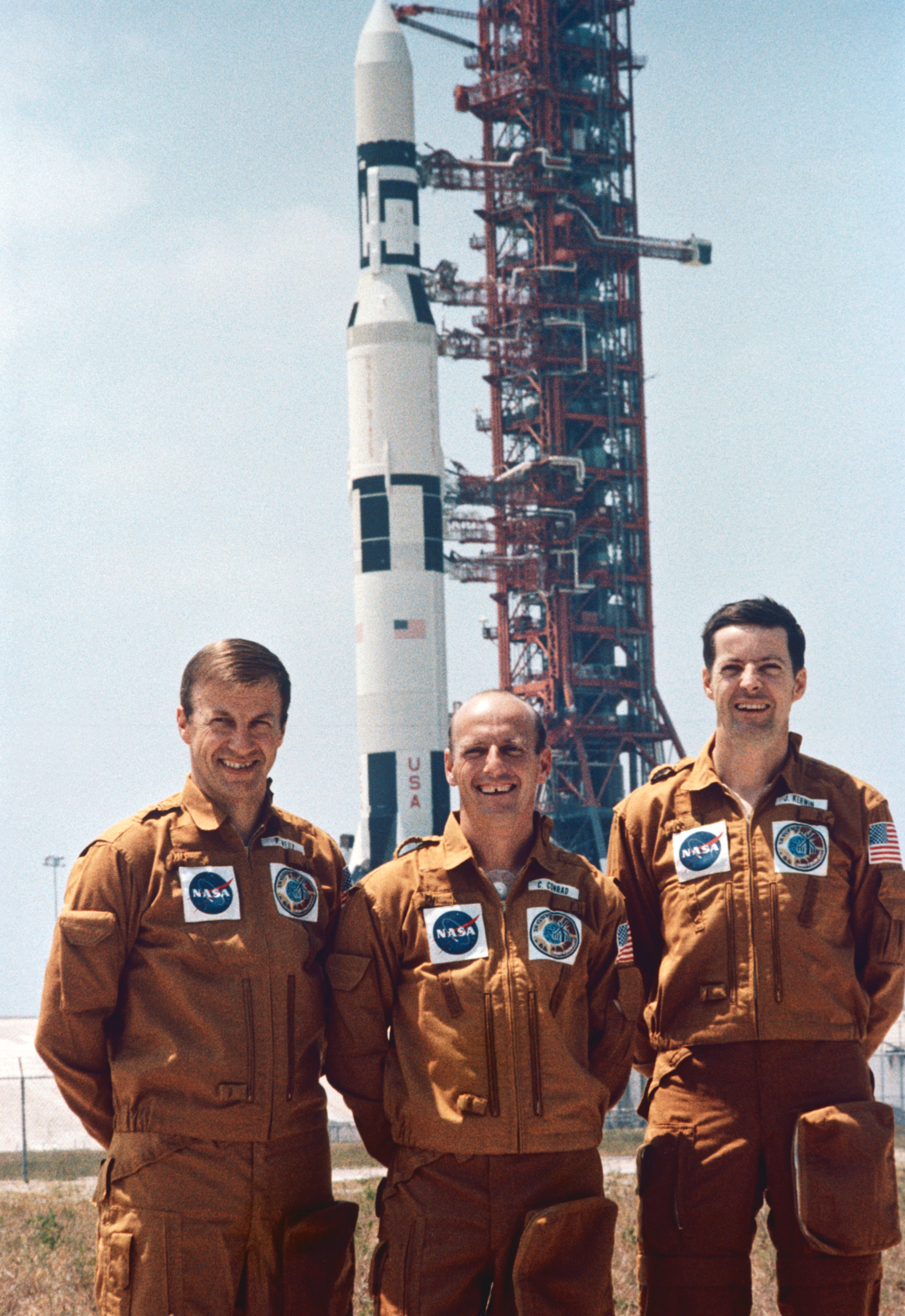
Paul J. Weitz, (left) Charles Conrad Jr. (middle); and Joseph P. Kerwin (right); America's first space station crew would spend 28 days in space

Kerwin retired from the Navy, left NASA, and joined Lockheed in 1987. At Lockheed, he managed the Extravehicular Systems Project, providing hardware for Space Station Freedom, from 1988 to 1990; with Paul Cottingham and Ted Christian invented the Simplified Aid for EVA Rescue (SAFER), first tested for use by space walking astronauts on the International Space Station (ISS) during Space Shuttle flight STS-64. He then served on the Assured Crew Return Vehicle team, and served as Study Manager on the Human Transportation Study, a NASA review of future space transportation architectures. In 1994–95 he led the Houston liaison group for Lockheed Martin's FGB contract, the procurement of the Russian "space tug" which has become the first element of the ISS. He served on the NASA Advisory Council from 1990 to 1993.

He joined Systems Research Laboratories (SRL) in June 1996, to serve as Program Manager of the SRL team which bid to win the Medical Support and Integration Contract at the Johnson Space Center. The incumbent, KRUG Life Sciences, was selected. Then, to his surprise, KRUG recruited him to replace its retiring president, T. Wayne Holt. He joined KRUG on April 1, 1997. On March 16, 1998, KRUG Life Sciences became the Life Sciences Special Business Unit of Wyle Laboratories of El Segundo, California.

In addition to his duties at Wyle, Kerwin serves on the Board of Directors of the National Space Biomedical Research Institute (NSBRI) as an industry representative. He retired from Wyle in the summer of 2004.

== Personal life ==
Kerwin married Shirley Ann née Good of Danville, Pennsylvania in 1960. They have three daughters.

== Organizations ==
He is a fellow of the Aerospace Medical Association, and a member of the Aircraft Owners and Pilots Association.

== Awards and honors ==
The all-Navy crew was awarded the Navy Distinguished Service Medal in 1973 from the Secretary of the Navy. The three Skylab astronaut crews were awarded the 1973 Robert J. Collier Trophy "For proving beyond question the value of man in future explorations of space and the production of data of benefit to all the people on Earth." Gerald Carr accepted the 1975 Dr. Robert H. Goddard Memorial Trophy from President Ford, awarded to the Skylab astronauts. The Skylab crew was awarded AIAA's Haley Astronautics Award for 1974.

He was one of 24 Apollo astronauts who were inducted into the U.S. Astronaut Hall of Fame in 1997.

== Books ==
Kerwin is co-author, along with fellow astronaut Owen K. Garriott and writer David Hitt, of Homesteading Space, a history of the Skylab program published in 2008.

Kerwin authored the book, Finding Eden, A Prehistorical Novel, published by Headline Books (8/1/2024), as J. P. Kerwin.

== In films ==
Kerwin is portrayed by Jack Hogan in the 1974 TV movie Houston, We've Got a Problem.

Joe Kerwin appears as himself in the 2018 documentary film Searching for Skylab.

== See also ==
- List of spaceflight records
- The Astronaut Monument
