= Wheels Stop =

- Author: Rick Houston
- Language: English
- Genre: Science
- Publisher: University of Nebraska Press
- Publication date: December 2013
- Publication place: United States
- Media type: Print (Hardcover)
- Pages: 480 pp (hardcover)
- ISBN: 9780803235342 (hardcover edition)
- Preceded by: Bold They Rise

Wheels Stop: The Tragedies and Triumphs of the Space Shuttle Program, 1986-2011 is a 2013 nonfiction book by Rick Houston. Wheels Stop tells the stirring story of how, after the Space Shuttle Challenger disaster, the Space Shuttle not only recovered but went on to perform its greatest missions.

The book is part of the Outward Odyssey spaceflight history series by the University of Nebraska Press.

Wheels Stop was reviewed in the Air & Space Smithsonian magazine, and by the American Library Association's Booklist.
