= Owen Garriott =

American electrical engineer and astronaut (1930–2019)

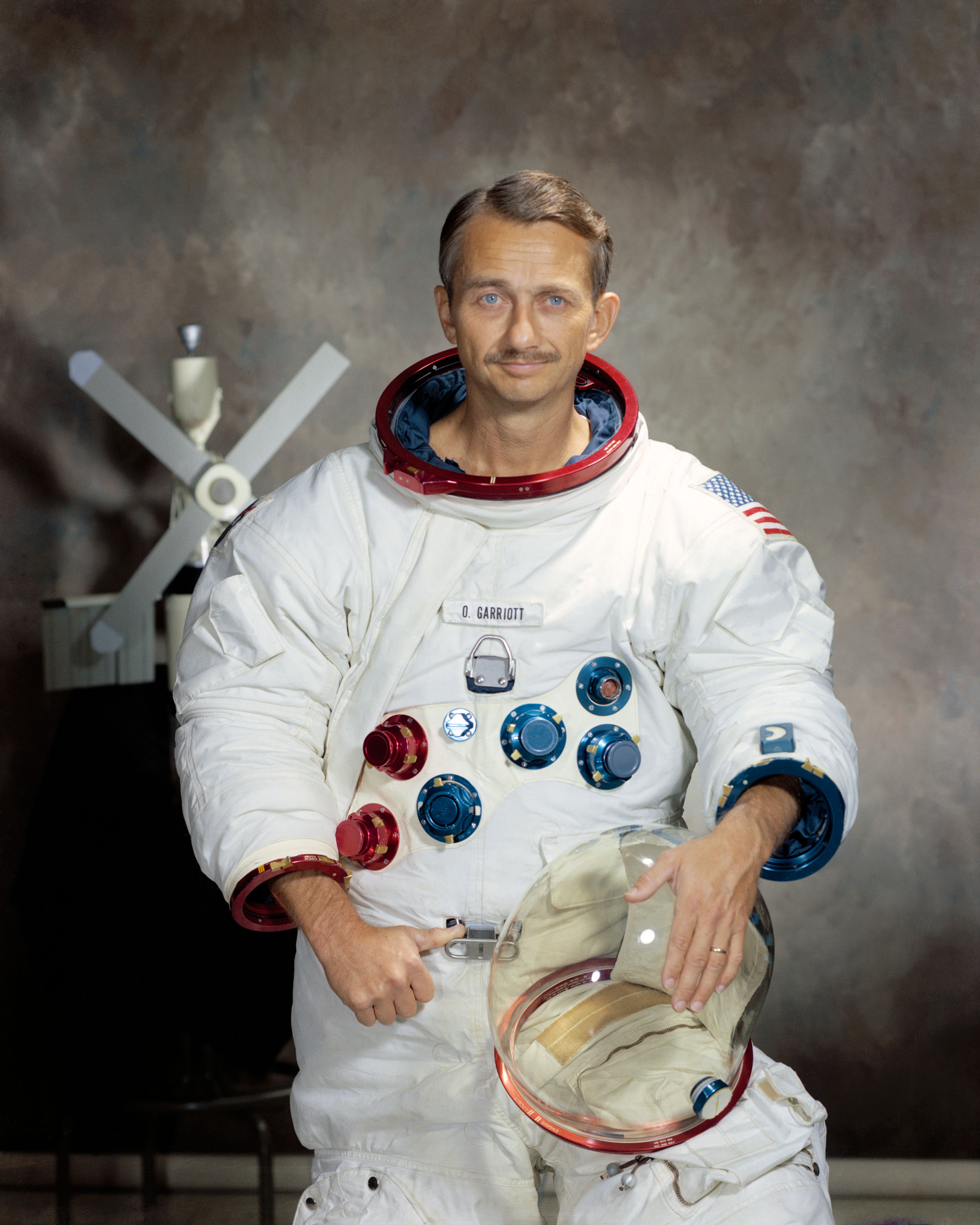
- Garriott in 1971
- Born: Owen Kay Garriott; November 22, 1930; Enid, Oklahoma, U.S.
- Died: April 15, 2019 (aged 88); Huntsville, Alabama, U.S.
- Education: University of Oklahoma (BS); Stanford University (MS, PhD)
- Awards: NASA Distinguished Service Medal
- Space career

NASA astronaut
- Time in space: 69d 18h 56m
- Selection: NASA Group 4 (1965)
- Total EVAs: 3
- Total EVA time: 13h 43m
- Mission: Skylab 3 STS-9
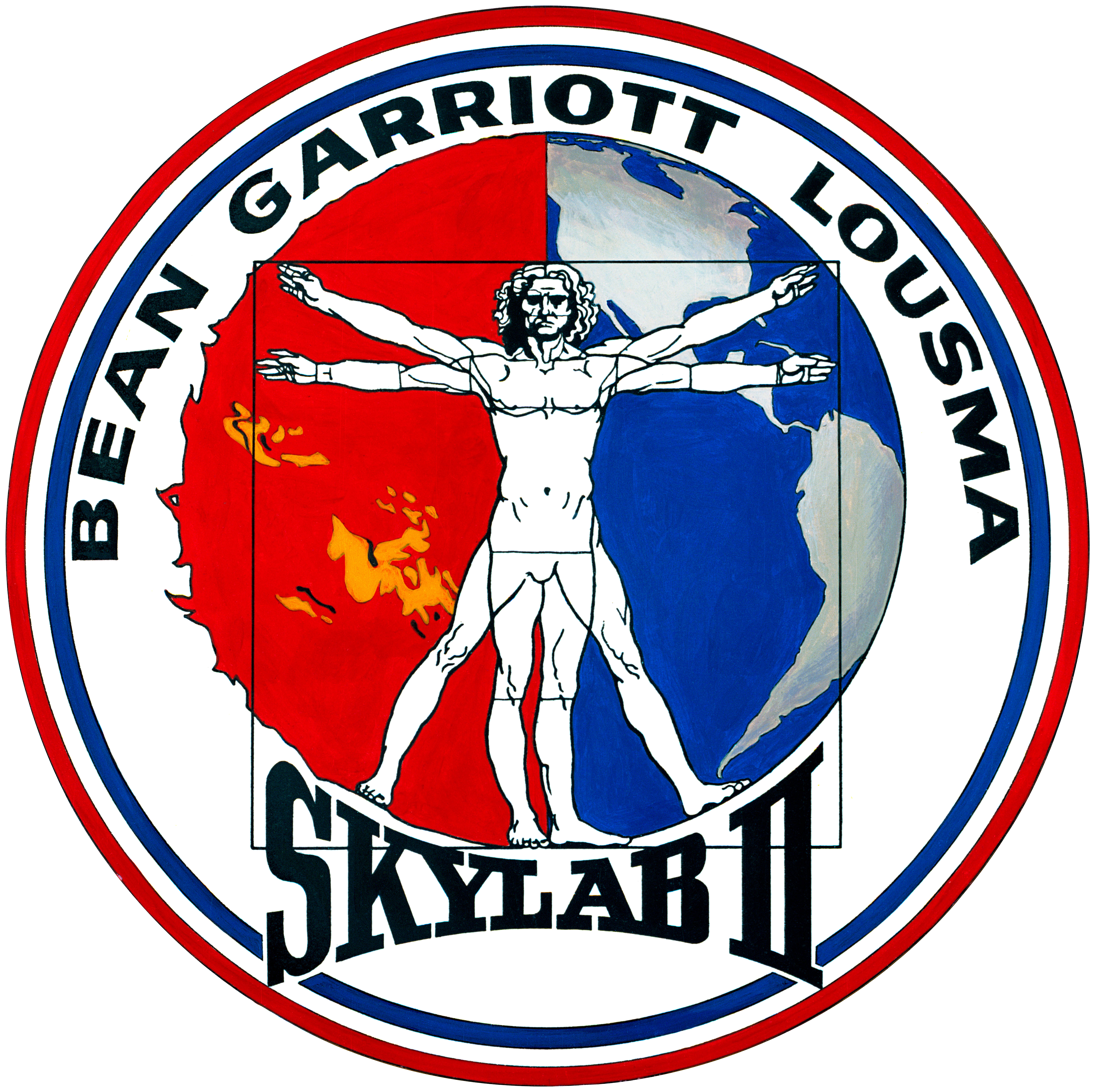
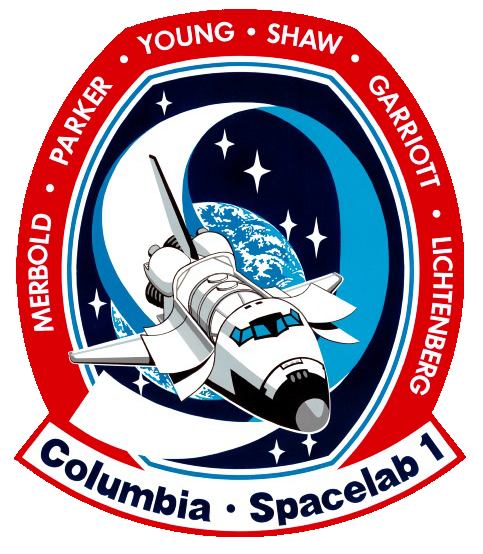
- Mission insignia
- Retired: June 1986
- Scientific career
- Children: Richard Garriott; Robert Garriott
- Thesis: The Determination of Ionospheric Electron Content and Distribution from Satellite Observations (1959)
- Doctoral advisor: Oswald Villard; Allen Peterson
- Doctoral students: Aldo da Rosa

Owen Kay Garriott (November 22, 1930 – April 15, 2019) was an American electrical engineer and NASA astronaut, who spent 60 days aboard the Skylab space station in 1973 during the Skylab 3 mission, and 10 days aboard Spacelab-1 on a Space Shuttle mission in 1983.

After serving in the United States Navy, Garriott was an engineering professor at Stanford University before attending the United States Air Force Pilot Training Program and later joining NASA. After his NASA career, he worked for various aerospace companies, consulted on NASA-related committees, taught as an adjunct professor, and conducted research on microbes found in extreme environments.

== Early life ==
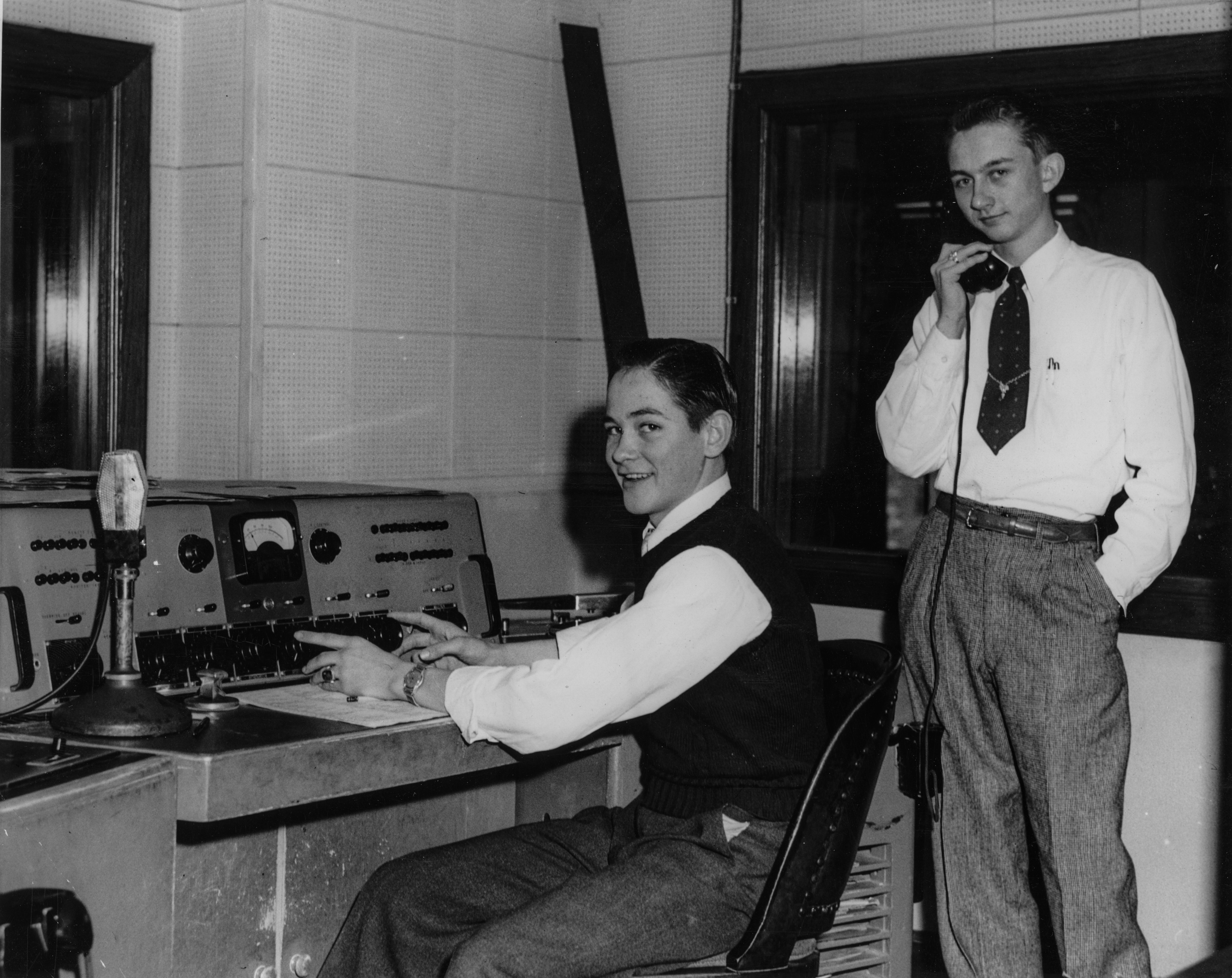
Owen Garriot (standing) worked at a local Enid Oklahoma radio station while in high school, with Robert Miles (seated). Both men went on to serve as electrical technicians in the US Navy, and both attended the University of Oklahoma.

Owen Kay Garriott was born in Enid, Oklahoma, on November 22, 1930, to Owen and Mary Catherine Garriott (née Mellick). Owen's middle name was based on his mother's middle name. He was a Boy Scout (earning the rank of Star Scout), and graduated from Enid High School in 1948, where he served as senior class president and was voted "Most Likely To Succeed." He received a Bachelor of Science degree in electrical engineering from the University of Oklahoma in 1953, where he was a member of Phi Kappa Psi fraternity. He was also the elected president of the senior class. He later earned Master of Science and Ph.D. degrees from Stanford University in electrical engineering in 1957 and 1960, respectively.

== Career ==
=== U.S. military ===
Garriott served as electronics officer in the United States Navy from 1953 to 1956. From 1961 through 1965, he was an assistant professor and associate professor of electrical engineering at Stanford University. He performed research and led graduate studies in ionospheric physics after obtaining his doctorate, and authored or co-authored more than 45 scientific papers, chapters and one book, principally in areas of the physical sciences.

As a prerequisite of the era's scientist-astronaut training, he completed a one-year United States Air Force pilot training program in 1966, receiving qualification as pilot in jet aircraft.

=== NASA ===
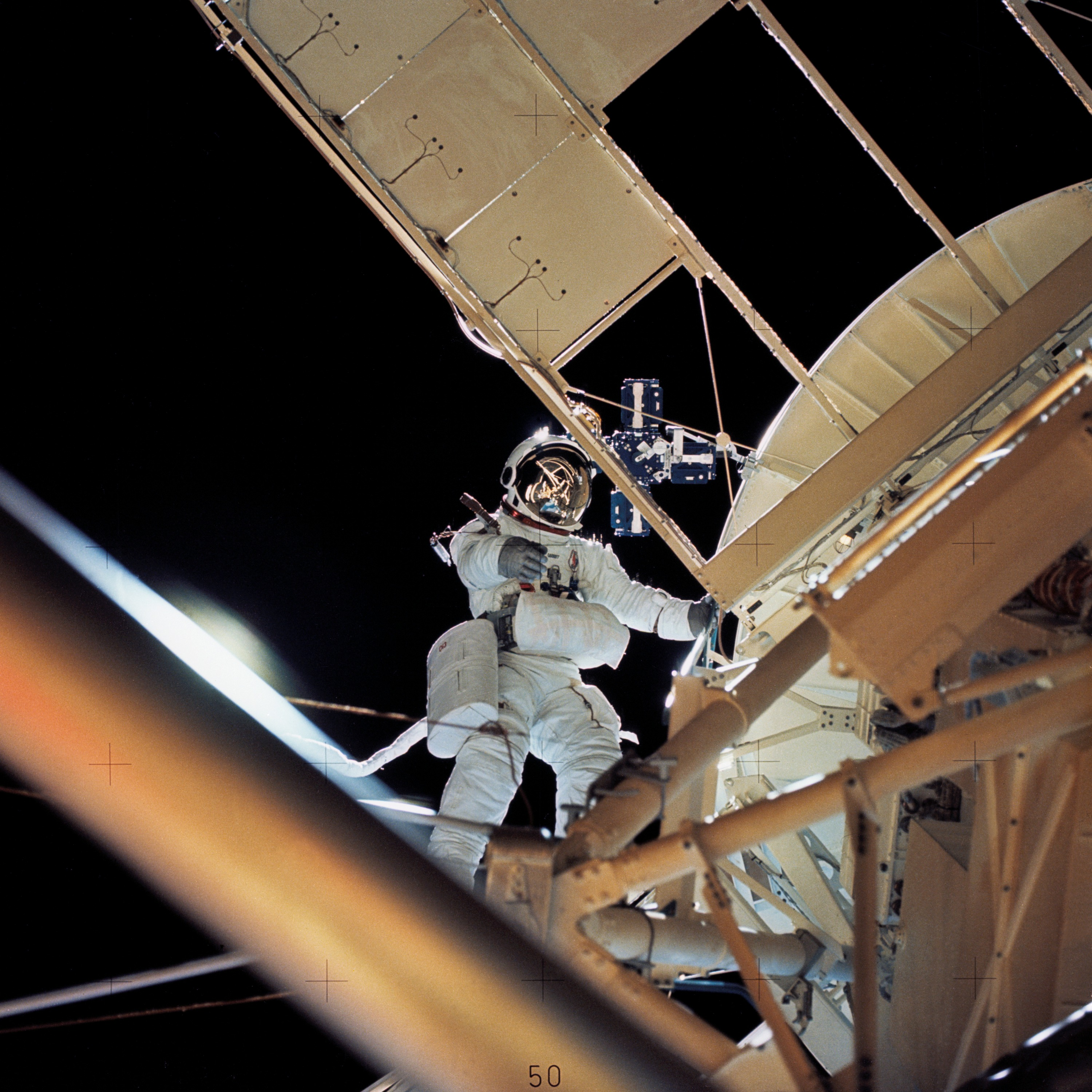
Garriott spacewalking at the Apollo Telescope Mount, after deploying Particle Collection S149 Experiment on an ATM solar panel

In 1965, Garriott was among the six scientist-astronauts selected by NASA. His first spaceflight, the Skylab 3 mission in July–September 1973, set a record for duration of over 59 days, more than doubling the one of the spring's Skylab 2, just to be soon beaten by Skylab 4. Extensive experiments were conducted of the Sun, of Earth resources and in various life sciences relating to human adaptation to weightlessness.

Garriott's second space flight was aboard STS-9 (Spacelab-1) in November–December 1983, a multidisciplinary and international mission of 10 days aboard Space Shuttle Columbia. Over 70 separate experiments in six different disciplines were conducted, primarily to demonstrate the suitability of Spacelab for research in all these areas. Garriott was also an Extra Class amateur radio operator holding call sign W5LFL. He operated the world's first amateur radio station in space and on December 1, 1983 made the first amateur radio contact from space using a Motorola handheld 2-meter radio. Amateur radio subsequently expanded into an important activity on dozens of shuttle flights, Space Station Mir and the International Space Station, with scores of astronauts and cosmonauts participating.

Between these missions, Garriott received a NASA fellowship in the Space Station Project Office. In this position, he worked closely with the external scientific communities and advised the project manager concerning the scientific suitability of the space station design.

Garriott held the distinction of being the NASA astronaut with the earliest-obtained PhD degree, having earned his PhD from Stanford University in 1960, two years before Robert A. Parker from Caltech in 1962.

=== The Skylab "stowaway" prank ===
On September 10, 1973, controllers in Houston were startled to hear a woman's voice beaming down from Skylab. The voice startled capsule communicator (CAPCOM) Robert Crippen by calling him by name, and then the woman explained: "The boys haven't had a home-cooked meal in so long I thought I'd bring one up." After several minutes in which she described forest fires seen from space and the beautiful sunrise, the woman said: "Oh oh. I have to cut off now. I think the boys are floating up here toward the command module and I'm not supposed to be talking to you." As Garriott later revealed, he had recorded his wife, Helen, before the launch, giving descriptions of multiple events that might occur during the mission.

=== Post-NASA career ===
After leaving NASA in June 1986, Garriott consulted for various aerospace companies and served as a member of several NASA and National Research Council Committees.

From January 1988 until May 1993, he was vice president of space programs at Teledyne Brown Engineering. This division, which grew to over 1,000 people, provided payload integration for all Spacelab projects at the Marshall Space Flight Center and had a substantial role in the development of the U.S. laboratory for the International Space Station.

Garriott devoted time to several charitable activities in his hometown, including the Enid Arts and Sciences Foundation of which he was a co-founder in 1992. Later, he accepted a position as adjunct professor in the Laboratory for Structural Biology at the University of Alabama in Huntsville and participated in research activities there involving new microbes he returned from extreme environments such as very alkaline lakes and deep sea hydrothermal vents. Hyperthermophiles were returned from several dives in Russian MIR submersibles to the Rainbow Vent Field at a depth of 2,300 meters near the Azores in the central Atlantic Ocean. Other research activities included three trips to Antarctica from which 20 meteorites were returned for laboratory study. Garriott formed a 501(c)(3) public philanthropic Garriott Family Foundation to finance the aforementioned adventure travel for himself, his wife and other members of his family.

== Personal life and death ==
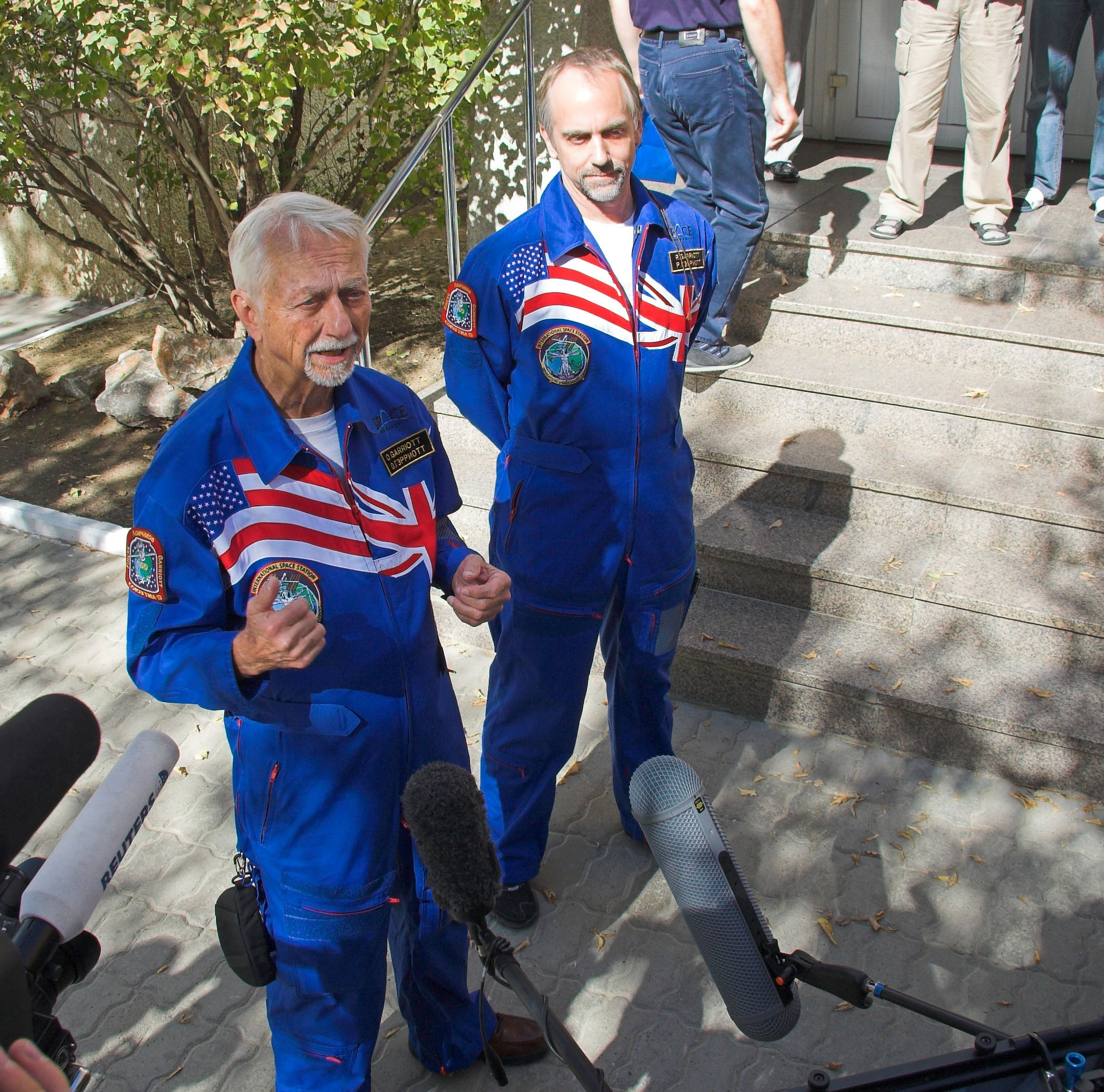
Owen with Richard, prior to his son's spaceflight

Garriott married Helen Mary Walker, his high school sweetheart, in 1952. They had four children, including Robert Garriott and Richard Garriott. After he divorced his first wife, Garriott married Evelyn L. Garriott, who had three children from a previous relationship.

His son Richard was launched as a space tourist on board Soyuz TMA-13 on October 12, 2008, the first American and the second person worldwide to follow a parent into space. Owen Garriott was in mission control at the Baikonur Cosmodrome in Kazakhstan for the launch and was in attendance when his son returned 12 days later.

Garriott died on April 15, 2019, at his home in Huntsville, Alabama.

== Organizations ==
Garriott was a member of the following organizations: American Astronautical Society (fellow), American Institute of Aeronautics and Astronautics (associate fellow), Institute of Electrical and Electronics Engineers, American Geophysical Union, American Association for the Advancement of Science, Association of Space Explorers (Board of Directors), Astronaut Scholarship Foundation (vice president and vice chairman).

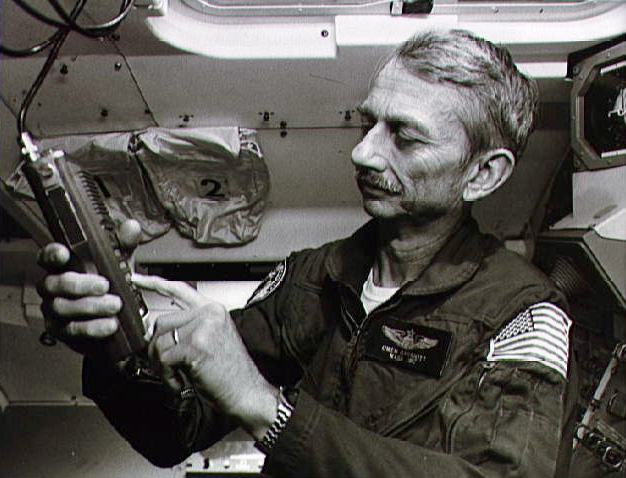
Garriott using an amateur radio during STS-9 training in 1983

== Awards and honors ==
Garriott received the following honors: National Science Foundation Fellowship, 1960–1961; Honorary Doctorate of Science, Phillips University (Enid, Okla.), 1973; NASA Distinguished Service Medal, 1973; Fédération Aéronautique Internationale V. M. Komarov Diploma for 1973; the Octave Chanute Award for 1975; and the NASA Space Flight Medal, 1983.

The three Skylab astronaut crews were awarded the 1973 Collier Trophy "For proving beyond question the value of man in future explorations of space and the production of data of benefit to all the people on Earth." Gerald Carr accepted the 1975 Dr. Robert H. Goddard Memorial Trophy from President Ford, awarded to the Skylab astronauts.

He was one of five Oklahoman astronauts inducted into the Oklahoma Aviation and Space Hall of Fame in 1980, the United States Astronaut Hall of Fame in 1997, the Oklahoma Military Hall of Fame in 2000, and the Enid Public Schools Hall of Fame in 2001.

Garriott was presented an Honorary Doctorate of Science from Phillips University in 1973.

A street named after him in Enid, Oklahoma, serves as one of the city's main thoroughfares. It is part of U.S. Route 412.

== Books ==
Garriott was co-author, with fellow astronaut Joseph Kerwin and writer David Hitt, of Homesteading Space, a history of the Skylab program, published in 2008. He was co-author of Introduction to Ionospheric Physics with Henry Rishbeth. Garriott was also a contributor to the book NASA's Scientist-Astronauts by David Shayler and Colin Burgess. Garriott wrote the foreword to the book.

== See also ==
- List of spaceflight records
- The Astronaut Monument
