= John R. Casani =

American engineer (1932–2025)

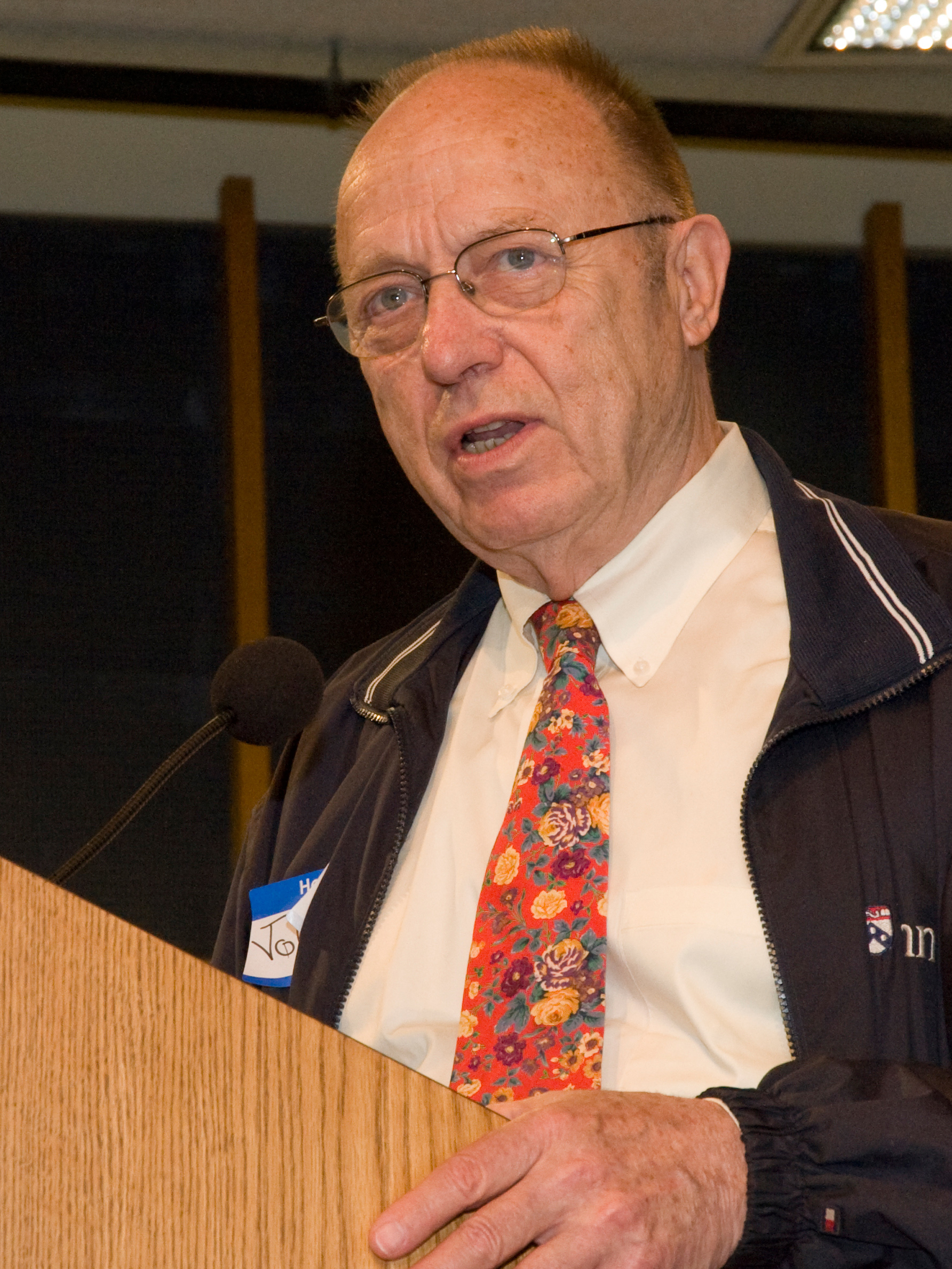
- Casani in 2009
- Born: John Richard Casani; September 17, 1932; Philadelphia, Pennsylvania, U.S.
- Died: June 19, 2025 (aged 92)
- Education: University of Pennsylvania (BS)
- Occupation: Engineer
- Organization: Jet Propulsion Laboratory
- Children: 5 sons
- Awards: NASA Distinguished Service Medal (1991); NASA Exceptional Service Medal (1965); NASA Exceptional Achievement Medal (1999, 2000); NASA Outstanding Leadership Medal (1974, 1981)

John Richard Casani (September 17, 1932 – June 19, 2025) was an American engineer. He worked for the Jet Propulsion Laboratory on NASA projects, where he managed the Voyager, Galileo, Cassini and Prometheus projects.

Casani was elected a member of the National Academy of Engineering in 1989 for pioneering systems engineering of planetary spacecraft and for leadership of spacecraft engineering and science teams.

== Early life ==
John R. Casani was born in Philadelphia, Pennsylvania, on September 17, 1932, to Jack and Julia Casani. He attended St. Joseph's Preparatory School, where he studied no scientific technical subjects. He then entered the University of Pennsylvania with the intention of becoming a liberal arts major. During his sophomore year, he decided that the employment prospects for liberal arts majors were unpromising and decided to join the United States Air Force. When his father objected, he decided instead to major in electrical engineering like his college roommate. The roommate eventually dropped out, but Casani received his Bachelor of Science degree in the discipline in 1955.

== Jet Propulsion Laboratory ==
After graduation, Casani worked at the Rome Air Development Center in New York state. In 1956, he moved to Southern California, where he lived in his fraternity's house at the University of Southern California while looking for work. He was offered a position at North American Aviation working its Navaho missile project, but Jack James convinced him to join the Jet Propulsion Laboratory (JPL), where he worked on the guidance system for the Army Ballistic Missile Agency's Jupiter missile until the Sputnik crisis resulted in a change of priorities.

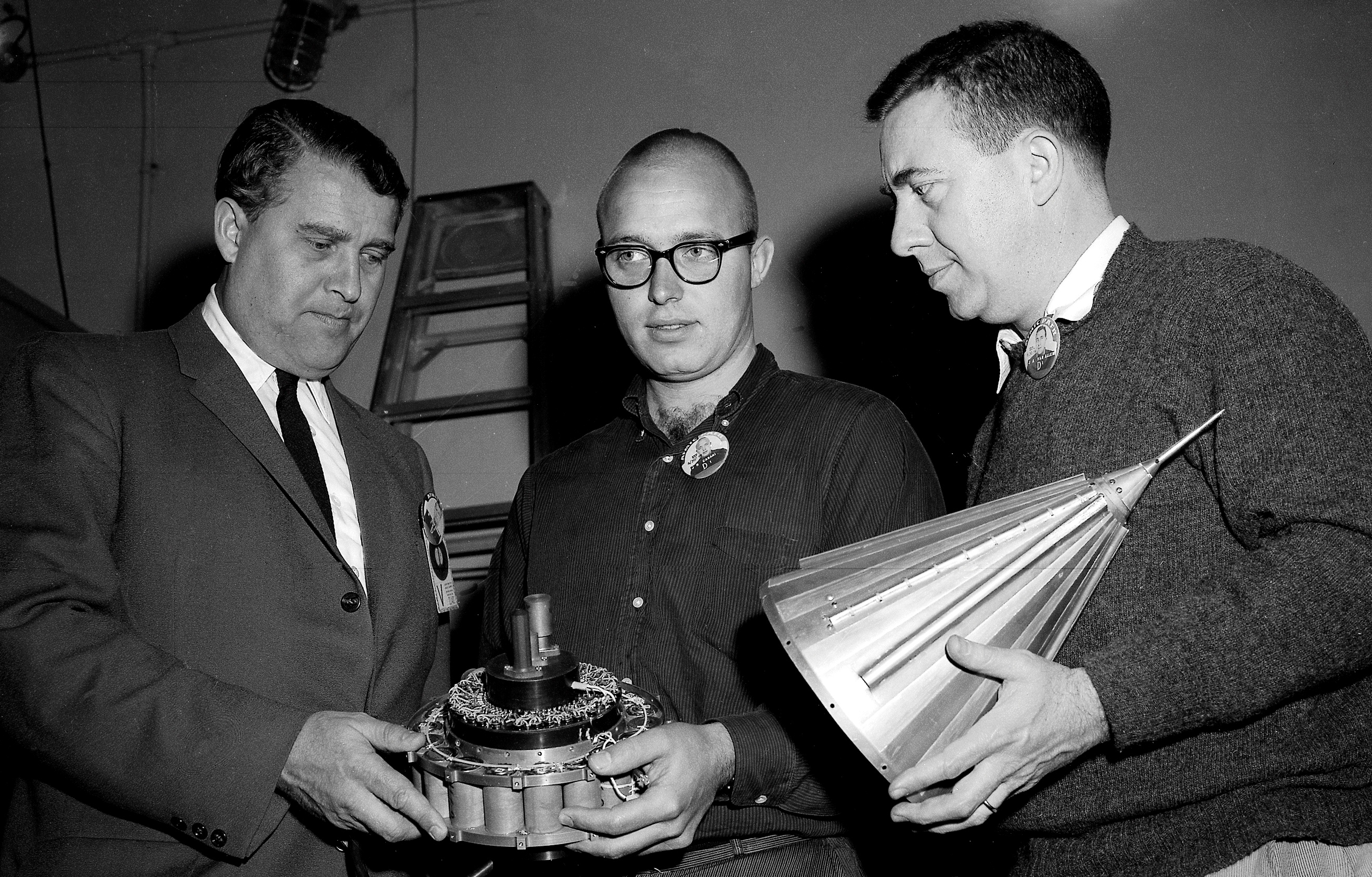
The Pioneer 4 probe is inspected by (left to right) Wernher von Braun, payload engineer John Casani and James Van Allen, 1959

From 1958 to 1959, Casani was a payload engineer working on Pioneer 3 and Pioneer 4. These spacecraft were so small that he carried them in a suitcase to the University of Iowa to have their instruments calibrated. He worked as a spacecraft systems engineer on Ranger 1 and Ranger 2 from 1959 to 1962, and then on the Mariner 3 and Mariner 4 Mars probes from 1962 to 1965. He became the Chief Engineer of the Mariner Mars project in 1965, Deputy Spacecraft System Manager in 1966, Spacecraft System Manager in 1969, and Project Manager in 1970. Early missions to Mars were dogged by failures, which a reporter attributed to the Great Galactic Ghoul. After a hiatus, the Ghoul returned on Mariner 7, and Casani received drawing and paintings of the Ghoul.

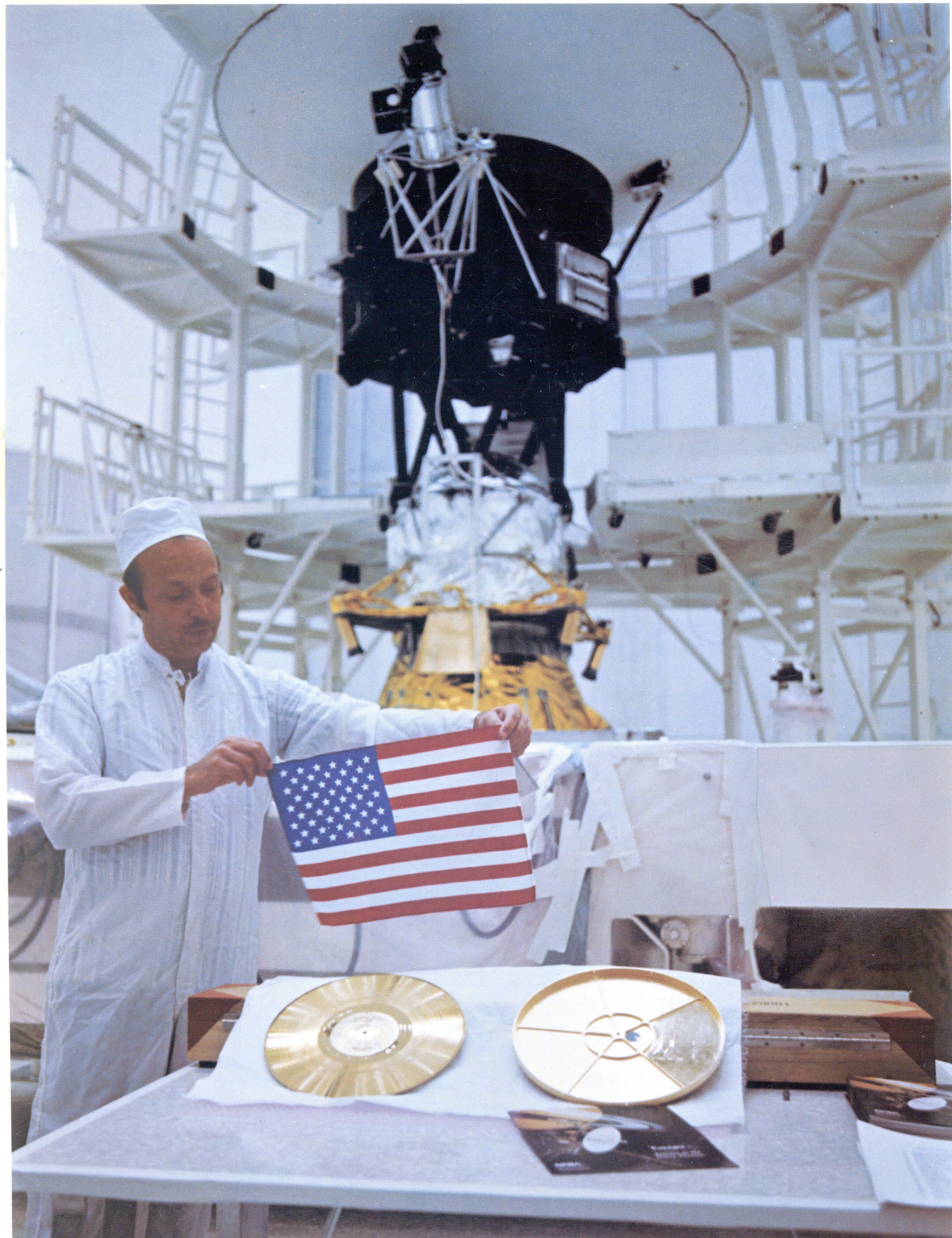
Casani with a small US flag and the Golden Record in front of Voyager 2, 1977

After Mariners, Casani was assigned as a deputy and successor to Mariner Jupiter-Saturn '77 project manager Harris Schurmeier, who was reassigned from the project to head a new program. MJS'77 was a mission developed from the Grand Tour to outer planets mission concept, though NASA approved only flybys of Jupiter and Saturn. Despite it, the MJS'77 team planned the mission to be extended. Casani worked on guidance and control systems, and instructed his team to build the hardware that would work "beyond Uranus and Neptune". Casani thought that the name − MJS'77 − was not suitable for the mission, and proposed to change it, even though the official insignia was already chosen. In the spring of 1976, he held a contest for a new name, with a case of champagne as a prize. Soon, "Voyager" became a winner. Casani also got the idea of an artifact attached to the spacecraft, "a message representing humanity to any alien civilization that might encounter humanity’s first interstellar emissaries." He asked astronomer Carl Sagan to think about it, and the idea evolved into the Voyager Golden Record. Casani served as project manager for the Voyager program from 1975 to 1977, and after its successful launches was promptly reassigned to the Galileo, for which he worked from 1977 to 1988. This project was troubled by multiple delays and changes in configuration due to uncertainty as to how it should be launched on its way to Jupiter, and delays caused by the Space Shuttle Challenger disaster. It was finally launched by the Space Shuttle Atlantis in 1989, and reached Jupiter by a roundabout route in 1995. It remained in orbit around Jupiter until 2003. He became the Deputy Assistant Laboratory Director for Flight Projects in 1988, and Assistant Laboratory Director for Flight Projects in 1989. In 1994, he became Project Manager of the Cassini project. He became Chief Engineer at JPL in 1994.

Casani was described as a "good-natured" man, but was an autocratic project manager, nicknamed "Ayatollah Casani" by his colleagues.

Casani retired in 1999, but the retirement was a brief one; he was recalled two weeks later to work with the Johnson Space Center on a problem that could have caused the loss of the Shuttle Radar Topography Mission. He then headed up an internal JPL investigation of the loss of the Mars Climate Orbiter, Mars Polar Lander and Deep Space 2 probes, launched under cost-reduced "faster, better, cheaper" period, and was project manager for Project Prometheus until its termination in 2005. In 2000, he was invited to lead an independent commission for the British-European Beagle 2 Mars lander program. Casani retired from JPL in 2012.

== Personal life and death ==
Casani was married for 39 years to Lynn Casani; she died in 2008. They had five sons. He died on June 19, 2025, at the age of 92. His papers are held by the Jet Propulsion Library and Archives.

== Awards ==
Over a long career at JPL, Casani received many awards, including the NASA Distinguished Service Medal in 1991, the NASA Exceptional Service Medal in 1965, the NASA Exceptional Achievement Medal in 1999 and 2000, and the NASA Outstanding Leadership Medal in 1974 and 1981. He received the Management Improvement Award for the Mariner Venus Mercury mission in 1974, the American Institute of Aeronautics and Astronautics' Space Systems Award in 1979, and the National Aerospace Club's Astronautics Engineer Award in 1981 for the Galileo project. He was also awarded the von Karman Lectureship in 1990, the American Astronautical Society Space Flight Award in 1989 and William Randolph Lovelace II Award in 2005, and the National Air and Space Museum Trophy for Lifetime Achievement in 2009. He received an honorary doctorate from the University of Pennsylvania in 2000, and from the University of Rome La Sapienza in 2000 for his work on Voyager, Galileo and Cassini.

== Selected publications ==
- Casani, John (1966). "Use of Failure-Mode Effect Analysis for Improving Spacecraft Reliability". Stepping Stones to Mars Meeting. doi:10.2514/6.1966-2051.
- Casani, John R. (January 1986). Galileo − Responses to the Challenger accident (Report).
- Casani, John R. (1987). Galileo's new route to Jupiter (Report). Bibcode:1987spmp.conf..313C.
- Casani, John (1991). "Countdown to the 21st century in planetary exploration". 29th Aerospace Sciences Meeting. doi:10.2514/6.1991-1.
- Brace, Richard; Casani, John; Farquhar, Robert; Haynes, Norm; Jordan, Frank; Kohlhase, Charles; Mitchell, Robert; Polutchko, Robert J.; Schallenmuller, Al; Slonski, John P.; Tolson, Robert H. (November 11, 1999). Report on the loss of the Mars Climate Orbiter Mission : JPL special review board (Report).
- Albee, Arden; Battel, Steven; Brace, Richard; Burdick, Garry; Casani, John; Lavell, Jeffrey; Leising, Charles; MacPherson, Duncan; Burr, Peter; Dipprey, Duane (2000). Report on the Loss of the Mars Polar Lander and Deep Space 2 Missions (Report).
- Casani, John (June 2004). "A New Spin". ASK Magazine (18).
- Casani, John (June 2004). "Engineering Memos". ASK Magazine (18).
- Casani, John R. (2004). "William Hayward Pickering". Physics Today. 57 (11): 86–87. Bibcode:2004PhT....57k..86C. doi:10.1063/1.1839390.
- Lehman, D.H.; Clark, K.B.; Cook, B.A.; Gavit, S.A.; Kayali, S.A.; McKinney, J.C.; Milkovich, D.A.; Reh, K.R.; Taylor, R.L.; Casani, J.R.; Griebel, T. (2006). "Experiences in Managing the Prometheus Project". 2006 IEEE Aerospace Conference. pp. 1–12. doi:10.1109/AERO.2006.1656163. ISBN 0-7803-9545-X.
- Casani, John (August 20, 2010). James Webb Space Telescope (JWST) Test Assessment Task (TAT): Briefing to the NASA Science Mission Directorate (Report).
- A Small Fission Power System for NASA Planetary Science Missions (Report). December 2011.
- Sotin, Christophe J.; Oleson, Steven R.; McClure, Patrick R.; McCarty, Steven L.; Elliott, John O.; Poston, David I.; Gibson, Marc A.; Strange, Nathan J.; Casani, John R. (January 30, 2020), Enabling a new generation of outer solar system missions: Engineering design studies for nuclear electric propulsion
- Casani, John R. (January 30, 2020). Kilopower-nuclear electric propulsion for outer solar system exploration (NEP Benefits Study) (Report).
