= Nikolai Tsymbal =

Soviet and Russian air force officer

- Николай Андреевич Цымбал
- Born: Nikolai Andreyevich Tsymbal; 20 January 1925; Nastashka, Rokytne Raion, Belotserkovsky Okrug, Kiev Governorate, Ukrainian SSR, USSR
- Died: 15 January 2020 (aged 94); Moscow, Russia
- Military career
- Allegiance: USSR; Russia
- Branch: Soviet Air Forces
- Service years: 1941–1988
- Rank: General-Lieutenant of Aviation
- Awards: Order of the Red Banner; Order of the Red Banner of Labour; Order of the Red Star (2); Order of the Patriotic War, 1st and 2nd classes Order "For Service to the Homeland in the Armed Forces of the USSR", 2nd and 3rd classes Order of Friendship

Nikolai Andreyevich Tsymbal (Russian: Николай Андреевич Цымбал; 20 January 1925 – 15 January 2020) was an officer of the Soviet Armed Forces. He worked in the force's political branch and reached the rank of General-Lieutenant of Aviation.

Born in 1925, Tsymbal served during the Second World War and saw action in several theatres. He was assigned to serve in the armed forces' political wing after the war, gradually rising through the ranks and eventually reaching the posts of deputy head of the Soviet Air Force's political department and deputy head of the Gagarin Air Force Academy. In retirement he was deputy chairman of the Soviet, and after 1991, the Russian Committees of war veterans, and wrote and contributed to several books. He died in 2020, having received a number of awards over his career, including the Order of the Red Banner, the Order of the Red Banner of Labour, and the Order of Friendship.

== Early life and wartime service ==
Tsymbal was born on 20 January 1925, in the village of Nastashka, in Rokytne Raion, Belotserkovsky Okrug. At the time this was part of Kiev Governorate, in the Ukrainian SSR, and a part of the Soviet Union. He volunteered for service in the Red Army after the Axis invasion of the Soviet Union in 1941, and rose from being a cadet, to platoon commander, and then deputy company commander of the 2nd Moscow Military Infantry School. He transferred to a Komsomol infantry regiment in 1942, and saw action with a heavy self-propelled artillery regiment on the 1st Belorussian Front and 2nd Baltic Front. Over the period of the war he served on the Kalinin, Western, 1st Belorussian, 1st and 2nd Baltic Fronts, and was twice wounded.

== Post war ==
After the war Tsymbal studied at the V. I. Lenin Military-Political Academy, and on graduating was assigned to serve in the political wing of the armed forces, rising steadily from the assistant to the head of the political department of a corps to that of an army, and then as assistant head of the political department of the Baku Air Defence District with responsibility for Komsomol work. He then became head of the political department of the bomber division, and then deputy commander of the Group of Forces in the Arctic.

Tsymbal graduated from the Military Academy of the General Staff in 1966, and from then until 1972 served as a member of the Military Council of the 1st Special Far Eastern Air Army. From 1972 until 1981 he was first deputy head of the political department of the Soviet Air Force, and then from 1981 until his retirement in 1988, was deputy head of the Gagarin Air Force Academy. After retiring, Tsymbal was deputy chairman of the Soviet, and after 1991, the Russian Committees of war veterans, until 1995. He remained an advisor to the chairman of the union until his death. Tsymbal twice served in the Civic Chamber of the Russian Federation.

Tsymbal also pursued academic interests, being a candidate of historical sciences and an associate professor. He wrote and contributed to several books, including Commissars in the Line of Fire. 1941 – 1945, and The First Cosmonaut of Planet Earth. The latter work, edited by Tsymbal, was published in English as First Man In Space: The Life and Achievement of Yuri Gagarin: A Collection. His work was later cited by other scholars, including Francis French and Colin Burgess in their 2007 work Into That Silent Sea. Tsymbal kept abreast of military affairs during his retirement, and as late as February 1995 was commenting on developments during the First Chechen War, observing that "Soldiers and even officers [,] that is, professional military men, are surrendering by the dozens. One can judge the morale of our troops by this alone." Commenting in Izvestia on the conflict, Tsymbal argued that "no army in the world could fight under the conditions created for our army."

Over his career Tsymbal had received a number of awards, including the Order of the Red Banner, the Order of the Red Banner of Labour, two Orders of the Red Star, the Order of the Patriotic War First and Second classes, the Order "For Service to the Homeland in the Armed Forces of the USSR" Second and Third classes, and the Order of Friendship. In retirement he lived in Moscow, and died there on 15 January 2020 at the age of 94. Krasnaya Zvezda, the official newspaper of the Russian Ministry of Defence published his obituary, noting that "The blessed memory of Nikolai Andreyevich Tsymbal, a faithful son of the Fatherland, will be preserved in the hearts of colleagues, veterans and soldiers of the Russian air forces." The head of the Union of Veterans, General Mikhail Moiseyev, also expressed his condolences.
