= CollectSPACE =

Online community for space history enthusiasts

collectSPACE.com

- Screenshot of collectSPACE on Dec. 5, 2009
- Website type: space history reference
- Available in: English
- Owner: Robert Pearlman
- Creator: Robert Pearlman
- Website: www.collectspace.com
- Commercial: supported by advertisements
- Registration: required only on forums
- Launched: July 20, 1999
- Current status: online

collectSPACE is an online publication and community for space history enthusiasts featuring articles and photos about space artifacts and memorabilia, information on past, current, and upcoming space events, space history collecting resources, and links to other space-related websites. It also provides an array of message boards where registered members can discuss various aspects of space history and the space collecting hobby; buy, sell, or trade items; or pose "what if?" historical questions. Users often abbreviate the website's name as "cS," and members often refer to each other as "cSers."

collectSPACE, founded and edited by Robert Pearlman, has published articles and reviews by authors Andrew Chaikin (A Man on the Moon), Kris Stoever (For Spacious Skies), James Oberg (Red Star in Orbit), Frederick Ordway III (Imagining Space), Francis French (In the Shadow of the Moon), David Hitt (Homesteading Space), Russell Still (Relics of the Space Race), Colin Burgess (Into That Silent Sea), Jay Gallentine (Ambassadors From Earth) and Apollo astronaut Walt Cunningham, among others.

== History ==
The website's intended name was spacememorabilia.com, for which a logo had been designed; however, the URL was owned (though not in use) by former Gemini and Apollo astronaut Pete Conrad. Pearlman instead bought the URL collectSPACE.com, which came online on July 20, 1999, the 30th anniversary of the Apollo 11 Moon landing (Conrad died unexpectedly from internal injuries from a motorbike accident on July 8).

collectSpace originally contained a photo gallery, drawing on Pearlman's personal collection; "Sightings," a calendar of astronaut appearances; and a short article about Apollo 11 anniversary toys. "Sightings" was chosen to show up in Internet searches for Sightings, a TV series about UFOs. The site's original tagline was "memorabilia from the conquest of the final frontier," which became "The Source for Space History & Artifacts."

collectSPACE earned national media attention later in 1999 for its role in halting a controversial eBay auction for Space Shuttle Challenger debris. In September 1999, it first covered a space memorabilia auction—Christie's East—followed by Superior Galleries of Beverly Hills, California the following month. collectSPACE was the first to webcast space memorabilia auctions, providing live audio (and one year, video) from Superior Gallery's auction floor, as well as live hammer results (auction houses subsequently added their own webcast capabilities or partnered with eBay for live online bidding).

The site's message board went online in November 1999. Among those posting and replying to messages have been former Apollo (EECOM flight controller) Sy Liebergot; Stephen Clemmons, a member of the Apollo 1 ground support crew; Project Mercury astronaut Scott Carpenter's daughter Kris Stoever; astronaut Pete Conrad's son, Pete Conrad, III; National Air and Space Museum curator Allan Needell, space historian Dwayne A. Day, Who's Who in Space authors Michael Cassutt and Rex Hall, Kraig McNutt of "Today In Space History," and The Surfaris' former bassist Andrew Lagomarsino, among others. A number of astronauts are cS readers.

collectSPACE was nominated for The Houston Chronicle's best blog in its Ultimate Houston Readers Pick for 2005.

In 2006, collectSPACE was the first to reveal the name of NASA's next planned crewed spacecraft, Orion, and publish its logo; as well as the name Altair for the next planned lunar lander.

== Charitable auctions ==
In the wake of the 9-11 terrorist attacks, collectSPACE organized Heroes Helping Heroes, an online auction benefiting the American Red Cross. In partnership with Yahoo! Auctions, the site offered bidders the chance to have an item of their choice signed by one of 22 retired astronauts, who volunteered to participate. $12,686 was raised.

Between 2003 and 2006, collectSPACE hosted annual silent auctions benefiting the Astronaut Scholarship Foundation. The astronaut experiences and artifacts auctions have raised more than $180,000 for exceptional college students seeking degrees in science and engineering.
