= Alfred Worden =

American astronaut (1932–2020)

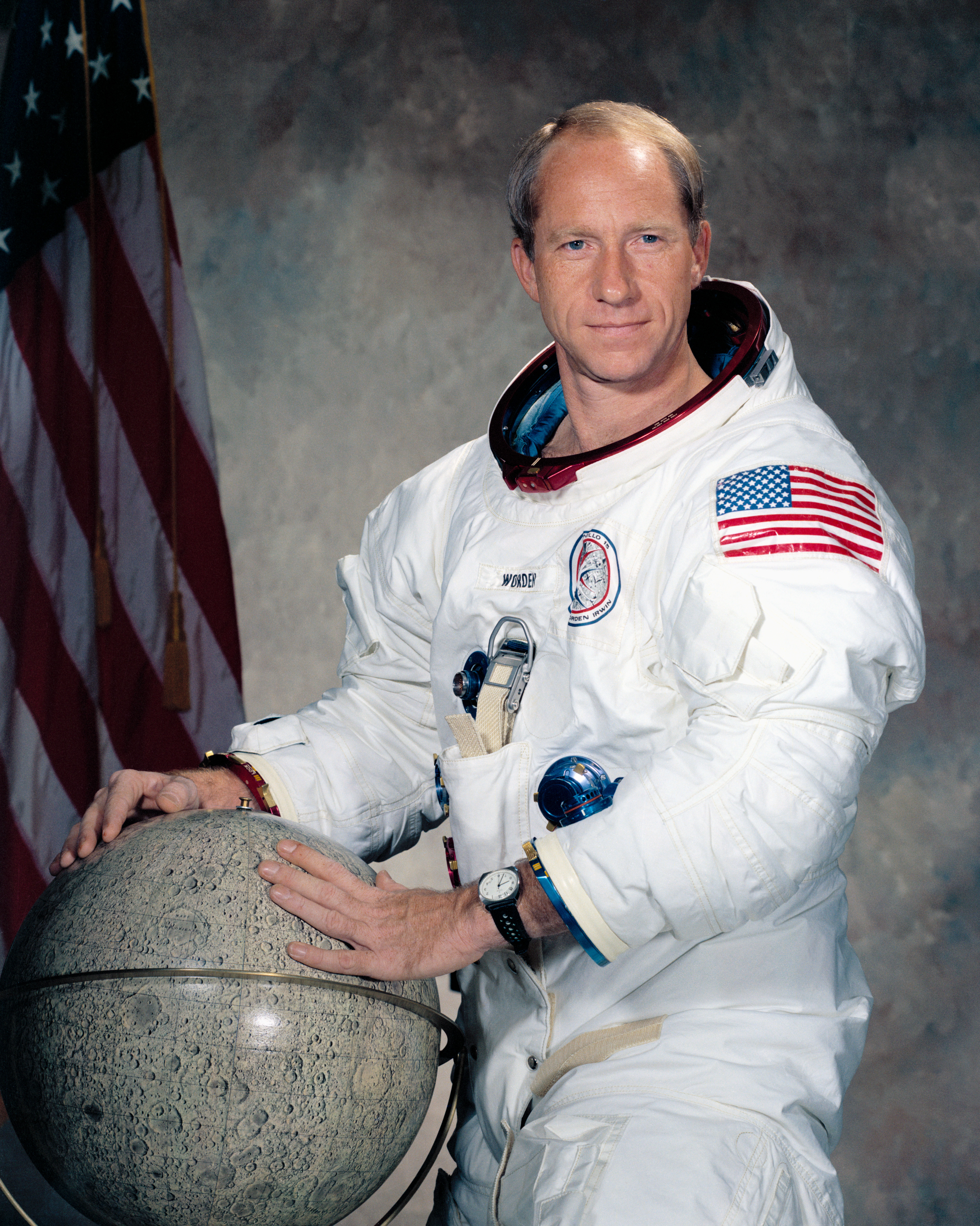
- Worden in 1971
- Born: Alfred Merrill Worden; February 7, 1932; Jackson, Michigan, U.S.
- Died: March 18, 2020 (aged 88); Sugar Land, Texas, U.S.
- Education: United States Military Academy (BS); University of Michigan (MS)
- Spouse(s): Pamela Vander Beek (m. 1955; div. 1969) Sandra Lee Wilder (m. 1974; div. 1980) Jill Lee Hotchkiss (m. 1982; died 2014)
- Children: 2
- Awards: NASA Distinguished Service Medal
- Space career

NASA astronaut
- Rank: Colonel, USAF
- Time in space: 12d 7h 12m
- Selection: NASA Group 5 (1966)
- Total EVAs: 1
- Total EVA time: 38m
- Mission: Apollo 15
- Retired: September 1, 1975
- Website: Official website

Alfred Merrill Worden (February 7, 1932 – March 18, 2020) was an American test pilot, engineer and NASA astronaut who was command module pilot for the Apollo 15 lunar mission in 1971. One of the 24 Apollo astronauts to reach the Moon, he orbited it 74 times in the command module (CM) Endeavour.

Worden was born in Michigan in 1932; he spent his early years living on farms and attended the University of Michigan for one year, before securing an appointment to the United States Military Academy at West Point, New York. Graduating in 1955, he elected to be commissioned in the United States Air Force, though he had no piloting experience. He proved adept at flying fighter planes, and honed his skills, becoming a test pilot before his selection as a Group 5 astronaut in 1966. He served on the support crew for Apollo 9 and the backup crew for Apollo 12 before his selection for the Apollo 15 crew in 1970, with David Scott as commander and James Irwin as lunar module pilot.

After Apollo 15 reached lunar orbit, and his crewmates landed on the Moon, Worden spent three days alone in the CM, becoming in the process the individual who traveled the farthest from any other human being, a distinction he still holds. He took many photographs of the Moon and operated a suite of scientific instruments that probed the Moon. During Apollo 15's return flight to Earth, Worden performed an extravehicular activity (EVA), or spacewalk, to retrieve film cassettes from cameras on the exterior of the spacecraft. It was the first "deep space" EVA in history, and as of 2026 remains the one that has taken place farthest from Earth.

After their return, the crew became involved in a controversy over postal covers they had taken to the Moon; they were reprimanded by NASA and did not fly in space again. Worden remained at NASA until 1975 at the Ames Research Center, then entered the private sector. He engaged in a variety of business activities, and had a longtime involvement with the Astronaut Scholarship Foundation, serving as chair of its board of directors from 2005 until 2011. He made many public appearances, promoting a renewed space program and education in the sciences, before his death in 2020.

== Early life and education ==
Alfred Merrill Worden was born February 7, 1932, in Jackson, Michigan, the son of Merrill Bangs Worden and Helen Garnett Worden (née Crowell). The second of six children, and the oldest of the four boys, Alfred Merrill Worden lived on his family's farm outside the city of Jackson, though the family stayed part of the time at his maternal grandparents' farm near East Jordan. Worden attended Dibble, Griswold, Bloomfield and East Jackson grade schools and graduated from Jackson High School, where he became the student council president. He was a Boy Scout and earned the rank of First Class Scout.

His family was not wealthy, so Worden sought a scholarship to enable his studies. He was able to secure one to the University of Michigan, but it was good for only one year. Seeing the U.S. service academies as his road to an education, Worden took an entrance examination and was offered appointments both to the United States Military Academy at West Point, New York, and to the United States Naval Academy at Annapolis, Maryland. He selected West Point and began his studies there in July 1951. Worden later stated, "There was no way I was going to live the rest of my life on a farm. That kind of got me started down the path that led to NASA."

Worden came to like the demanding life at West Point, especially once he passed the initial stages of his military education and was given greater responsibility within the Corps of Cadets. In addition to his studies, he participated in cross country running, gymnastics and cheerleading. He received a Bachelor of Science degree in military science from West Point in 1955, finishing 47th out of 470 in his class.

== Military service ==
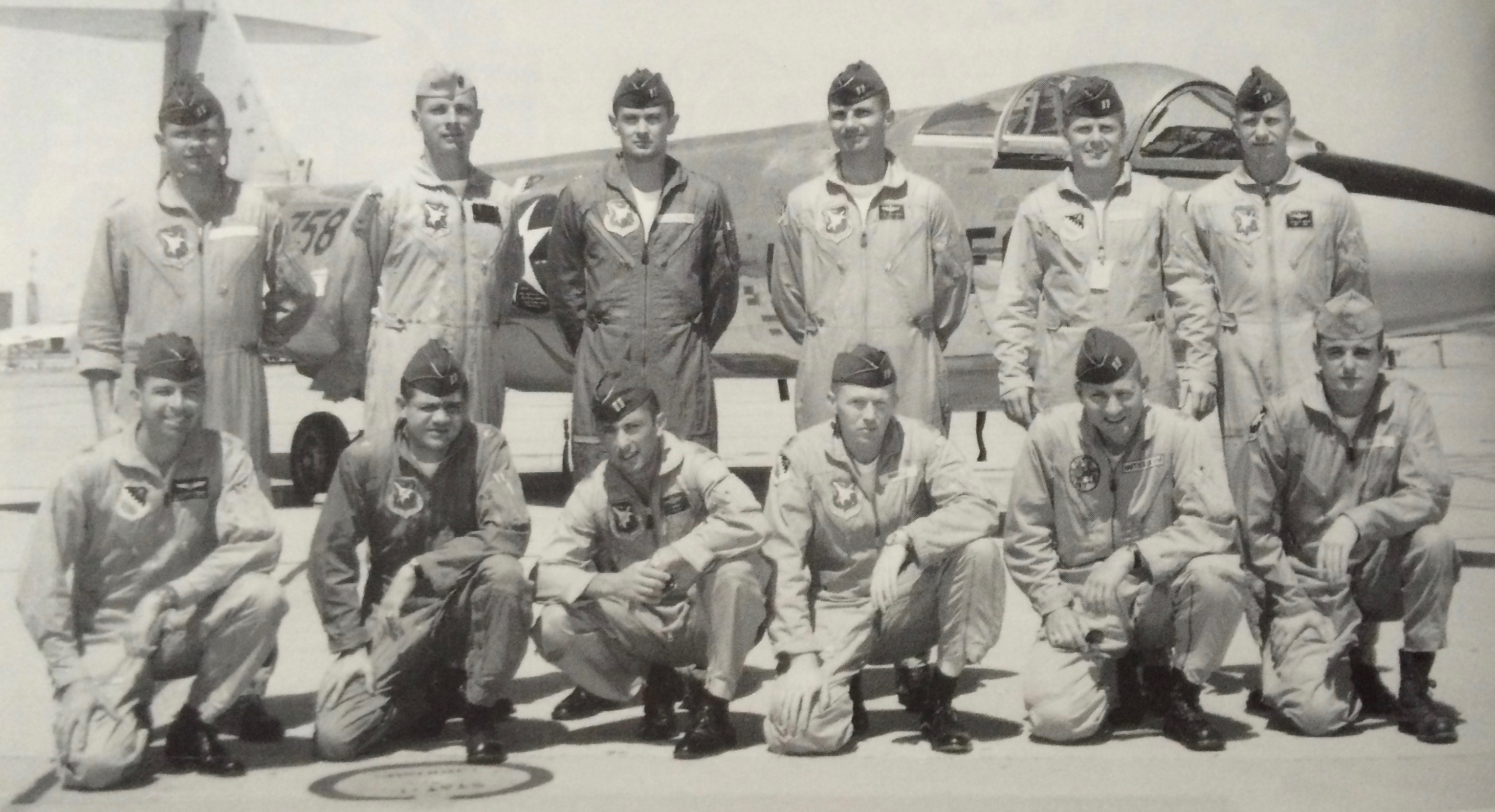
Worden's graduating class at the Aerospace Research Pilot School, 1965. Worden is standing furthest right.

At the time Worden graduated from West Point, he had no piloting experience. The United States Air Force Academy was not yet graduating cadets, and would not until 1959. Graduates of West Point and Annapolis were permitted to choose to be commissioned in the Air Force, and some of Worden's instructors urged this course upon him. He chose the Air Force, thinking promotion would be faster, something he subsequently learned was not the case.

Worden received primary flight training at Moore Air Force Base, Texas, where he learned to fly on Beechcraft T-34 trainer aircraft, coming to love piloting. Worden advanced for training at Laredo Air Force Base, Texas, on Lockheed T-33 jet trainers, and after eight months went on to Tyndall Air Force Base, Florida, for Air Defense Command training, flying F-86D Sabres. Worden first post-training assignment was with the 95th Fighter Interceptor Squadron at Andrews Air Force Base, near Washington, D.C., where he flew F-86Ds, and later, F-102 Delta Daggers. In addition to serving as a pilot there from March 1957 until May 1961, he was his squadron's armament officer.

Seeking both to advance his career and to benefit the Air Force, Worden in 1961 asked to be sent to study aerospace engineering at the University of Michigan. He earned Master of Science degrees in aerospace engineering and instrumentation engineering from the University of Michigan in 1963.

After graduation, Worden applied for U.S. Air Force Test Pilot School, but to his surprise, he was not selected. He learned that his superiors wanted him to be part of an exchange program with Britain's Royal Air Force and be trained at the Empire Test Pilots' School in Farnborough, England. Since that course would not begin for six months, Worden spent the time at the Randolph Air Force Base Instrument Pilots Instructor School. After successfully completing the course at Farnborough, second in his class, Worden returned to the U.S. He then served as an instructor at the Aerospace Research Pilot School (ARPS), to which he was ordered at the specific request of its commandant, Colonel Chuck Yeager, and from which he graduated in September 1965.

== NASA career ==
=== Selection ===
In 1963, Worden put his name in for selection to NASA Astronaut Group 3 but was told that though NASA was interested in him even without test pilot experience, he was ruled out by his pending orders to Farnborough, with which the agency could not interfere. Worden thought he would be beyond NASA's age limit for new astronauts when next free to consider such a career option, and so believed he would never be an astronaut.

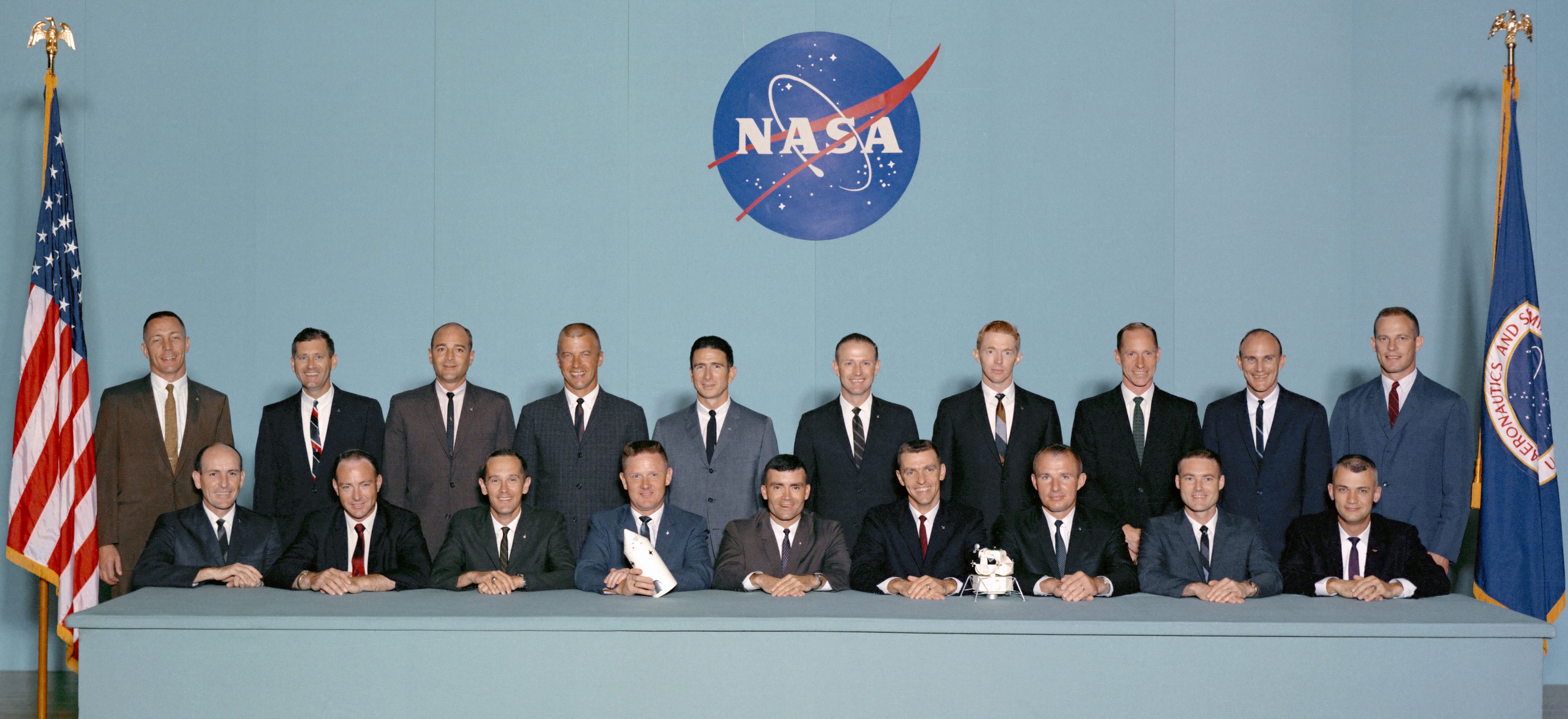
The Group 5 astronauts. Worden stands third from right.

NASA's recruitment for its fifth group of astronauts took place in 1965, at the same time the Air Force was seeking to recruit for its program, the Manned Orbiting Laboratory, with qualified pilots in the Air Force free to apply for either or both. Believing, as proved correct, that the Air Force program would never get off the ground, Worden chose to apply only to NASA, which he did in September 1965. Worden wrote in his first book of memoirs that "professionally, I figured it couldn't get any better than that. Even being a test pilot couldn't compare with being an astronaut and making a spaceflight." Under the selection criteria, candidates had to be born on or after December 1, 1929, raising the age limit from 34 to 36. Worden, aged 34 when selected, was one of the 19 candidates chosen by NASA in April 1966, together with his ARPS classmates Stuart Roosa and Charles Duke; four others were previous graduates.

Having been urged by NASA superiors to have plenty of astronauts available for the many hoped-for Apollo and Apollo Applications missions, Director of Flight Crew Operations Deke Slayton, the astronauts' supervisor, hired all the Group 5 candidates he considered qualified. Budget cuts and the diversion of funds to other programs meant there would be relatively few flights, and Worden perceived some resentment at the new intake from more senior astronauts as the competition for spots on Apollo missions intensified.

=== Early assignments ===
On October 3, 1966, Chief Astronaut Alan Shepard assigned Worden and four other Group 5 selectees, Ken Mattingly, Jack Swigert, Ronald Evans and Vance Brand, to the astronaut team dealing with the Block II command module (CM), headed by Pete Conrad. The Block I command modules were intended only for Apollo's initial Earth-orbit flights, and in fact never flew in space on a crewed mission; the Block II modules would go to lunar orbit. The following month, Worden was assigned as part of the support crew for the second crewed Apollo mission, along with Fred Haise and Edgar Mitchell. Apollo support crews were to do the things that the prime and backup crews did not have time for. Worden took the assignment as an indication that NASA management, including Slayton, was pleased with him.

Worden was at North American Aviation's plant in Downey, California, where the Block II command module was being built, on January 27, 1967, when he received an urgent phone call from Slayton, informing him that all three Apollo 1 astronauts had been killed in a fire at the launch pad, where a test was under way. Worden informed the other astronauts on-site and they flew back to Houston. He was especially saddened by the fact that the three accomplished pilots who were to make up the first Apollo space crew died on the ground, rather than flying. During the complete safety review that followed, Worden spent much of his time in Downey working on the Block II CM, seeking (with other CM specialists such as Swigert) to remove potential combustibles and other hazards. After the pause, he remained on the support crew for the second Apollo mission, which was to include testing of the CM and Lunar Module (LM) in Earth orbit.

This mission was initially designated Apollo 8. There were delays in the development of the LM and in August 1968, NASA official George Low proposed that if Apollo 7 in October went well, Apollo 8 should go to lunar orbit without a LM, so as not to hold up the program. The Earth-orbit test would become Apollo 9. The crew who had been scheduled for Apollo 8, led by Jim McDivitt, became the Apollo 9 crew, and Worden became part of that mission's support crew along with Mitchell and Jack Lousma.

Worden was named as backup command module pilot (CMP) for the Apollo 12 flight. Apollo 9's CMP had been David Scott, who became, by the normal rotation of crews instituted by Slayton, the backup commander of Apollo 12 and the prospective commander of Apollo 15, with Worden likely to be the CMP of Apollo 15's prime crew. Jim Irwin was named backup lunar module pilot (LMP) for Apollo 12, with similar prospects of flying on Apollo 15. Slayton, in his memoirs, mentioned that Worden had been on the support crew for Apollo 9, and deemed him a "logical choice". Worden wrote in his own autobiography that he and Irwin had learned of their selection for Apollo 12 at a meeting in Scott's office.

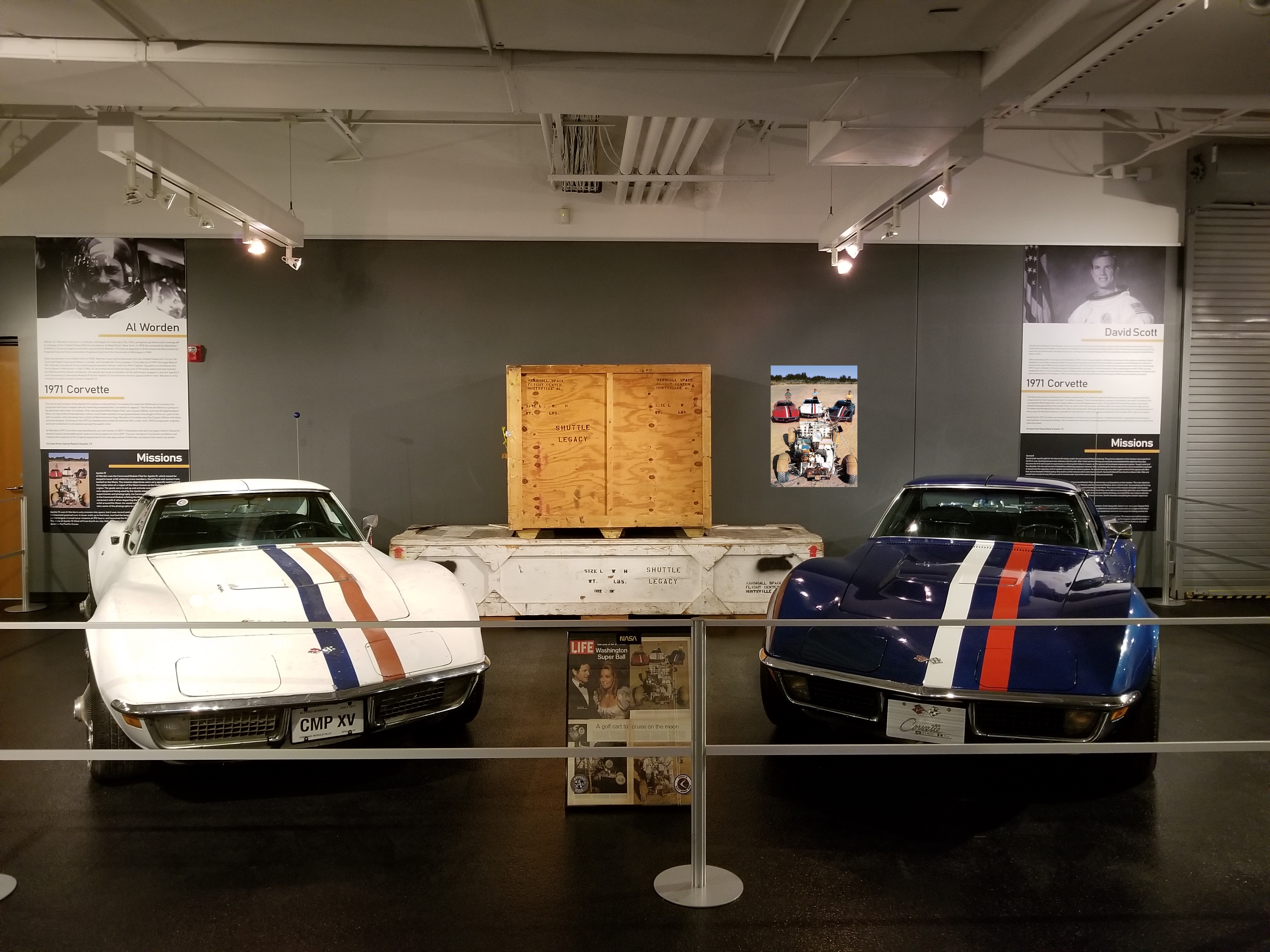
The Corvettes owned by Worden (left) and Scott, as photographed in 2019

As Apollo 12's backup command module pilot, Worden forged a close, lifelong friendship with the prime crew's CMP, Dick Gordon, with whom he trained. Worden remembered, "Dick was my buddy. We flew together and worked together for a year and a half when he was training for Apollo 12 and I was his backup. We just went everywhere together. We worked really hard but it was also a lot of fun." Gordon and Worden learned navigational techniques for space so that if communications with Mission Control failed, the CMP could bring the craft home. Worden remembered that the Apollo 12 prime crew, led by Pete Conrad, had a close bond and drove matching black and gold Chevrolet Corvettes at Kennedy Space Center (KSC). In reaction, the backup crew secured a red one for Irwin, white for Worden, and a blue car for Scott, both emphasizing their individuality within the crew and making them less conspicuous at times when they did not want to be recognized as astronauts, especially since the three cars were rarely seen together. (Note: Former race car driver Jim Rathmann owned a Cocoa Beach car dealership, and was friendly with many astronauts, for whom he got discount prices on General Motors automobiles. See Chaikin 1995, p. 249.)

=== Apollo 15 ===
==== Preparation and launch ====
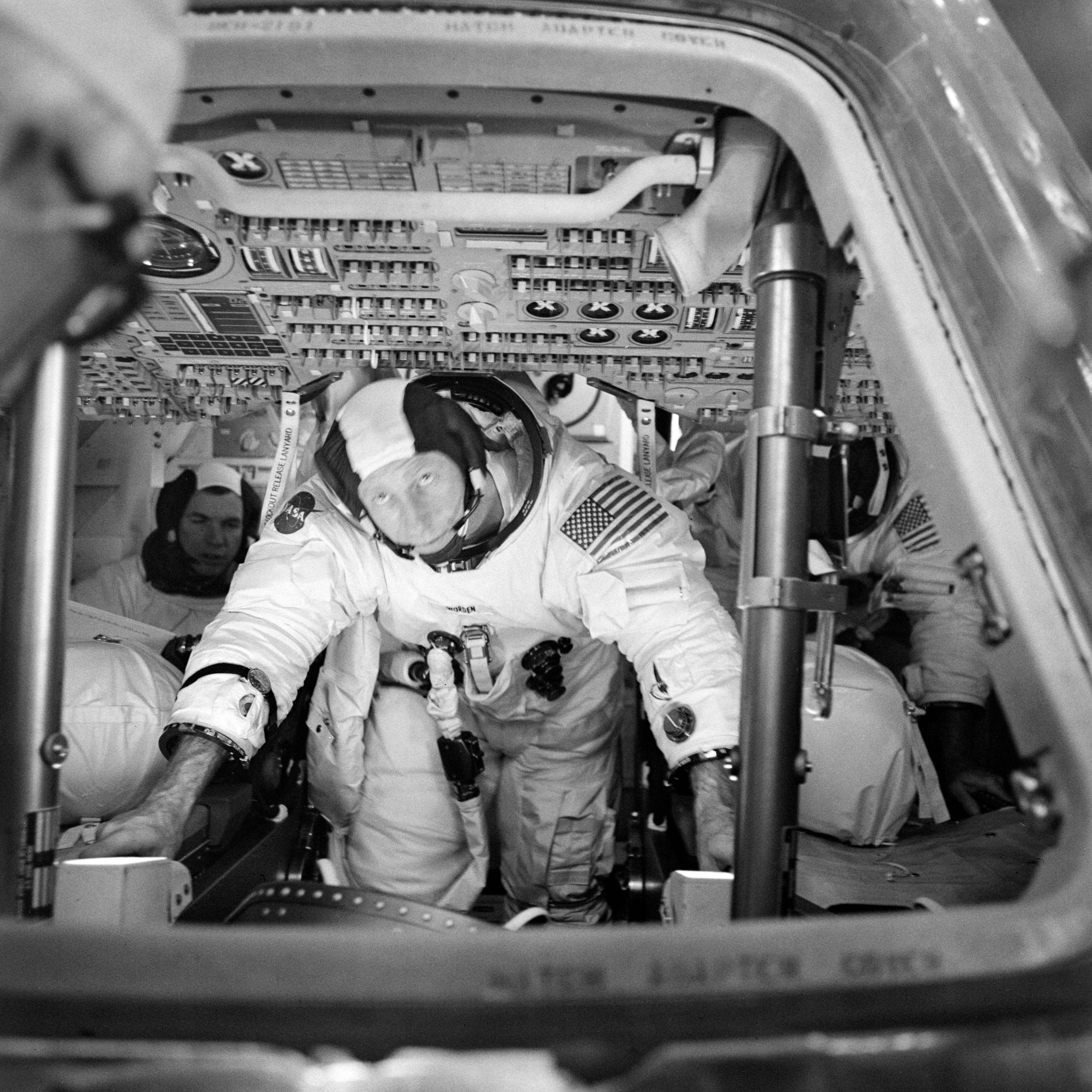
Worden in the command module during training

Scott, Worden, and Irwin were publicly named as the crew of Apollo 15 on March 26, 1970. Apollo 15 was originally scheduled to be an H mission, with a limited stay of 33 hours on the Moon and two moonwalks, but the cancellation of two Apollo missions in mid-1970 meant the flight would be a J mission, with three moonwalks during its three-day stay, the first Lunar Roving Vehicle (LRV), and in the service module (SM) a suite of scientific instruments to probe the Moon. It was Worden's job, as his crewmates walked on the Moon, to operate these devices. For the first time, observations from lunar orbit were made a formal mission objective, and, like the CMPs of Apollo 13 and Apollo 14, Worden worked with geologist Farouk El-Baz during training, learning to interpret what he saw as he flew over the mountains and deserts of the western United States. Worden found El-Baz to be an enjoyable and inspiring teacher. He also accompanied his crewmates on geology training which took them to places where they walked over terrain resembling the Moon's, including sites in Hawaii, Mexico, and Iceland. He trained for the possibility he might have to return without Scott and Irwin or rescue them if the LM launched into the wrong orbit. When he was not busy with that or other training, Worden spent much of his time at North American Rockwell's facilities at Downey, supervising the construction and testing of Apollo 15's command and service module (CSM).

Before leaving on his mission, Worden appeared on the children's television show Mister Rogers' Neighborhood. He felt NASA needed to do more to engage children, members of a generation whose support would one day be necessary for the space program. Fred Rogers was planning to do shows on parents going away on trips, and felt Worden's appearance would mesh well with that. Worden appeared on the show before going to the Moon and answered several children's questions: he wrote down some others and took them with him on the spacecraft, promising to think about them on the trip, and after the mission, appeared again on the program to answer them.

Apollo 15 took off on its lunar journey from KSC on July 26, 1971. Once trans-lunar injection had been achieved, placing the spacecraft on a trajectory towards the Moon, explosive cords separated the CSM, Endeavour, from the booster as Worden operated the CSM's thrusters to push it away. Worden then maneuvered the CSM to dock with the LM, Falcon, which was mounted on the end of the S-IVB (the booster that had supplied the thrust for TLI), and the combined craft was then separated from the S-IVB by explosives.

==== Lunar orbit ====
After the mission arrived in lunar orbit, Scott and Irwin entered Falcon while Worden remained in Endeavour. When the two craft failed to separate to allow Falcon and its crew to prepare for the Moon landing, Worden went into the docking tunnel and reconnected a loose umbilical, fixing the problem. Worden, in Endeavour, was able to listen as Scott and Irwin descended toward and landed on the Moon, but was unable to spot Falcon until a later orbit, though he passed over the targeted site at the moment of planned landing. He had executed a burn of the CSM's main engine, the Service Propulsion System, to send Endeavour from the lower orbit in which the two craft separated, to an orbit of 65.2 nautical miles (120.8 km; 75.0 mi) by 54.8 nautical miles (101.5 km; 63.1 mi) in preparation for his scientific work.

I didn't come to any conclusions. I still don't know what is out there. What I strongly sensed is that we as a species have not yet experienced enough of the universe. Whatever we believe now is probably not accurate. We have developed our ideas based only on what we can see, touch, and measure. Now I was having a glimpse into infinity and could only dimly sense, not understand, the journey ahead for humans.

— Alfred M. Worden

Worden began what amounted to a separate mission from his crewmates, with a separate CAPCOM and mission controllers. His main tasks while alone in lunar orbit were photography, and operating the instruments in the SIM bay. Filling previously unused space in the service module, the SIM bay contained a gamma-ray spectrometer, mounted on the end of a boom, an X-ray spectrometer and a laser altimeter, which failed part way through the mission. A stellar camera and a metric camera together comprised the mapping camera, which was complemented by a panoramic camera, derived from the long-classified Corona spy technology. Also present were an alpha particle spectrometer, which could be used to detect evidence of lunar volcanism, and a mass spectrometer, also on a boom in the hope it would be unaffected by contamination from the ship. He supplemented the photographs with verbal descriptions; Endeavour's inclined orbit caused it to pass over features never seen before in detail as Worden watched. Each time Endeavour's orbit passed from the far side of the Moon to a view of the Earth and renewed communications with Mission Control, Worden greeted it with the words, "Hello, Earth. Greetings from Endeavour", expressed in different languages. Worden and El-Baz had come up with the idea, and had collaborated on translations.

Busy as he was, he still had time to savor the experience. Knowing he was unlikely to come back to the Moon, Worden was determined to absorb the entire experience. He did not need all the rest periods for sleep, and spent part of that time in contemplation of what was outside his craft, and what it all meant. Through Endeavour's windows, he watched the Moon, the Earth, and the stars – he could see many more stars, and more intensely, than Earthbound observers. He concluded it was naive to believe Earth had the only life in the universe, and he wondered if space exploration was part of humanity's survival instinct to avoid being trapped in a single solar system.

Worden has been listed in the Guinness Book of World Records as the "most isolated human being" during his time alone in Endeavour. Orbiting the Moon alone, he was at his greatest distance from Scott and Irwin in Falcon, 2,235 miles (3,597 km) away from any other human beings. He later stated he enjoyed his "three wonderful days in a spacecraft all by myself", and that he was used to being alone as a fighter pilot. Worden remembered, "On the back side of the Moon, I didn't even have to talk to Houston and that was the best part of the flight."

==== Return ====
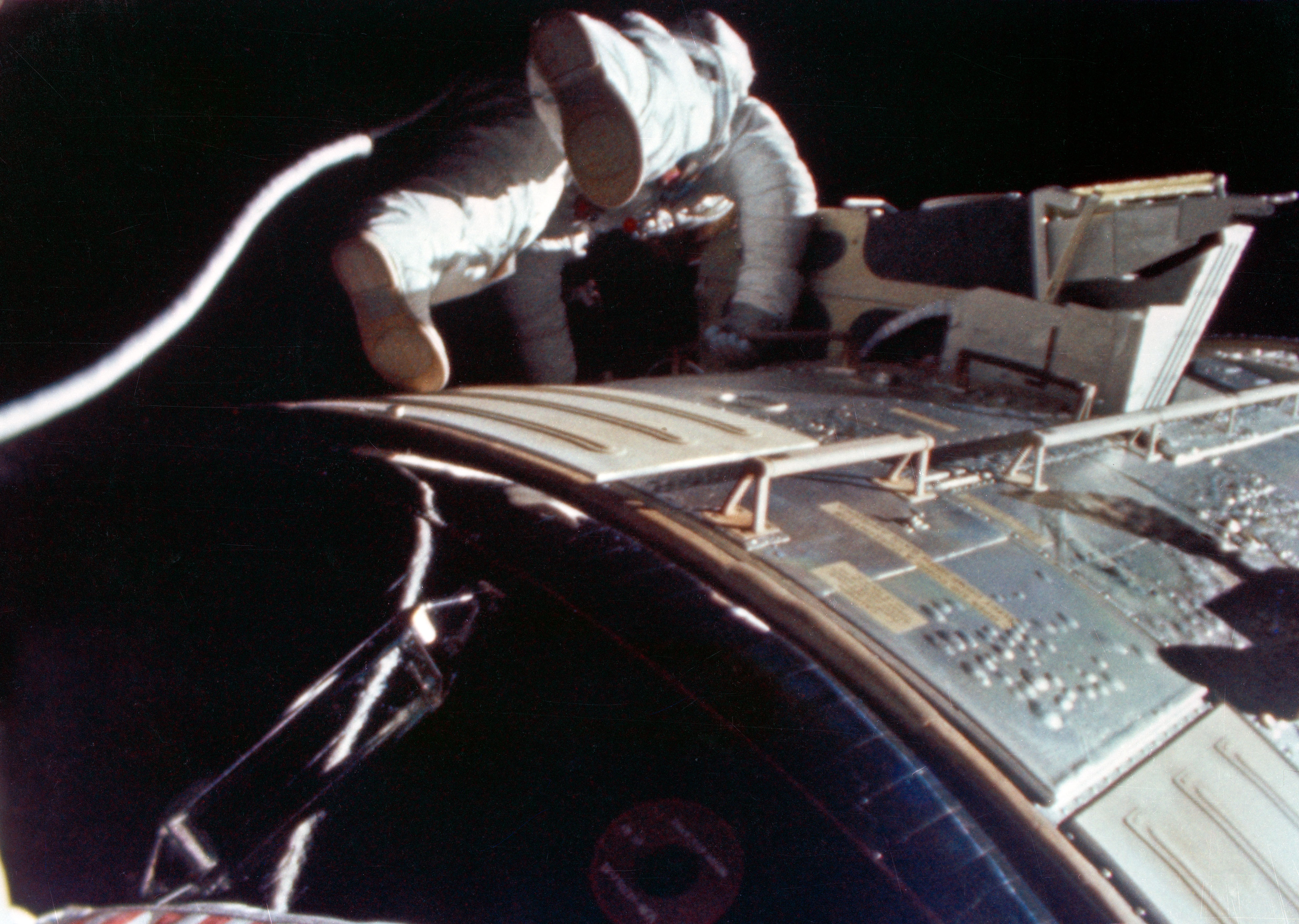
Worden performing the first deep-space EVA during Apollo 15's homeward journey (1971)

As Falcon took off from the Moon, Worden played a recording of the Air Force Song ("Off we go, into the wild blue yonder"), intending it to be heard only in Mission Control; somewhat to his chagrin, it was relayed to the LM, to the annoyance of Scott. Worden piloted the CSM as Scott maneuvered the LM, bringing them together in a direct rendezvous, on the first lunar orbit, the second time a first-orbit rendezvous had been accomplished (after Apollo 14).

Endeavour completed 74 lunar orbits prior to trans-Earth injection (TEI), the burn to take the astronauts home. On the way back to Earth, Worden did a spacewalk to retrieve film from the spacecraft's cameras. He took 38 minutes in extravehicular activity (EVA) outside Endeavour to accomplish this, three times venturing from outside the hatch to the exterior of the SIM bay of the SM. In retrieving the film cassettes from the panoramic and mapping cameras, Worden performed the first deep-space EVA, and reported his personal observations of the general condition of equipment housed there. Worden remains, as of 2020, the record-holder for the spacewalk performed furthest from Earth. Apollo 15 concluded with a Pacific splashdown and subsequent recovery by the amphibious assault ship USS Okinawa. In completing his flight, Worden logged 295 hours and 11 minutes in space.

=== Covers incident ===
The crew had, before the mission, agreed with an acquaintance named Horst Eiermann, who was working on behalf of a West German stamp dealer, Hermann Sieger, to carry 100 postal covers to the Moon in exchange for approximately $7,000 to each astronaut. The astronauts added 100 more for each crew member, though two covers were unaccounted for, leading to a total of 398. These were carried aboard Endeavour prior to launch by Scott in his spacesuit's pocket, were transferred into Falcon and spent three days on the lunar surface inside the lander. After the return, 100 covers were sent to Eiermann in West Germany, and the astronauts received the agreed payments. NASA rules required that personal items carried aboard Apollo flights be manifested for weight and other reasons and approved by Slayton; this was not done. The astronauts stated their intent had been to set up trust funds for their children, and that they intended that the covers not be sold or otherwise publicized until the Apollo program was over and they had left NASA and the Air Force. Astronauts were forbidden by standards of conduct issued in 1967 from using their position for financial gain for themselves or other people.

In addition to the 398 carried by Scott, Worden took 144 covers into space, at the instigation of F. Herrick Herrick, a retired movie director and a stamp collector. These had, as required, been approved by Slayton, who did not ask where Worden had gotten them. After the flight Worden sent 100 of them to Herrick, who sold some. These sales prompted an inquiry to NASA, alerting Slayton, who warned Worden to avoid further commercialization. Worden wrote an angry letter to Herrick, stating that the sales were putting his career at risk.

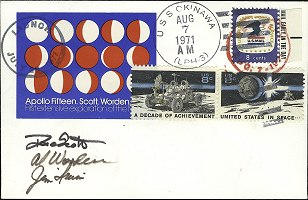
One of the covers created for Herrick

The 100 covers Scott sent to West Germany were put on sale to Sieger's customers in late 1971 at a price of about $1,500 each. After receiving the agreed payments, the astronauts returned them, and in the end, took no compensation. Slayton heard about the Sieger covers, and he spoke with Worden and Irwin; both referred him to Scott. Slayton, knowing Worden was a stamp collector, became suspicious that he had arranged both deals, and this led to repeated phone calls asking for details. In April 1972, Slayton met with Scott and Worden and learned from them that unauthorized covers had been flown. Worden remembered what hurt the most about that meeting was having disappointed Slayton, a man he greatly admired.

The Apollo 15 crew had been recycled as the backup crew for Apollo 17, the final Apollo mission, as using fully-trained astronauts was easier than training a fresh backup crew who would have no prospect of being the prime crew on a later lunar Apollo mission. But in May 1972, as Worden remembered, Slayton called him while Worden was preparing for geological training, instructing him to clear out his office and go back to the Air Force. Slayton had prevailed on Irwin to retire, letting NASA assign a new backup crew. Worden did not clear out his office but began looking into ways of staying at NASA, even if outside the Astronaut Corps. Slayton said at the time that he had to reduce the number of astronauts, that Irwin and Mitchell were eligible for retirement from the military, and the astronaut he could most easily do without after that was Worden; the postal covers incident had played a part in that determination.

The matter became public in June 1972 and the three astronauts were reprimanded for poor judgment on July 10. Concerned about commercialization of Apollo 15, the Senate Committee on Aeronautical and Space Sciences set a hearing for August 3, 1972; among those who testified were the astronauts, Slayton, NASA Administrator James C. Fletcher and Deputy Administrator George Low. Slayton wrote of the astronauts' testimony, "they came clean and took their lumps but I was still pretty pissed off about it."

This still left Worden trying to find a job at NASA; he testified before the committee that he had been told he could stay if he came to an agreement with whoever he was to work for. He found an ally in Associate Administrator for Manned Space Flight Dale D. Myers, who helped Worden get a position at the Ames Research Center in California. According to Low, NASA was aware that the reprimands made the astronauts essentially unpromotable in the Air Force, which would not have jobs for them worth their abilities, and it was decided that though the crew was removed from flight status, they would be given positions elsewhere in NASA. At Ames, Worden served as a Senior Aerospace Scientist, and from 1973 to 1975, chief of the Systems Study Division. He retired from NASA and the Air Force, with the rank of colonel, in 1975.

In his first book of memoirs, Worden took responsibility for making "a decision that fucked up my life completely, utterly, and irreversibly", but felt Scott did not take enough of the blame on himself. In a second book, published posthumously in 2021, Worden expressed his belief that Slayton would not have fired him from the Astronaut Corps if given the chance, but that Slayton's superior, Christopher C. Kraft, wanted him fired. Apollo 10 commander Thomas P. Stafford wrote an epilogue to Worden's first book and stated, "Al should not have his efforts degraded by the decades-old, short-lived publicity surrounding some postal covers carried on board." Worden later stated, "We probably didn't do the smartest thing in the world, but we didn't do anything that was illegal. We didn't do anything that anybody else hadn't done, but the consequences were rather severe to us."

== Post-NASA activities ==
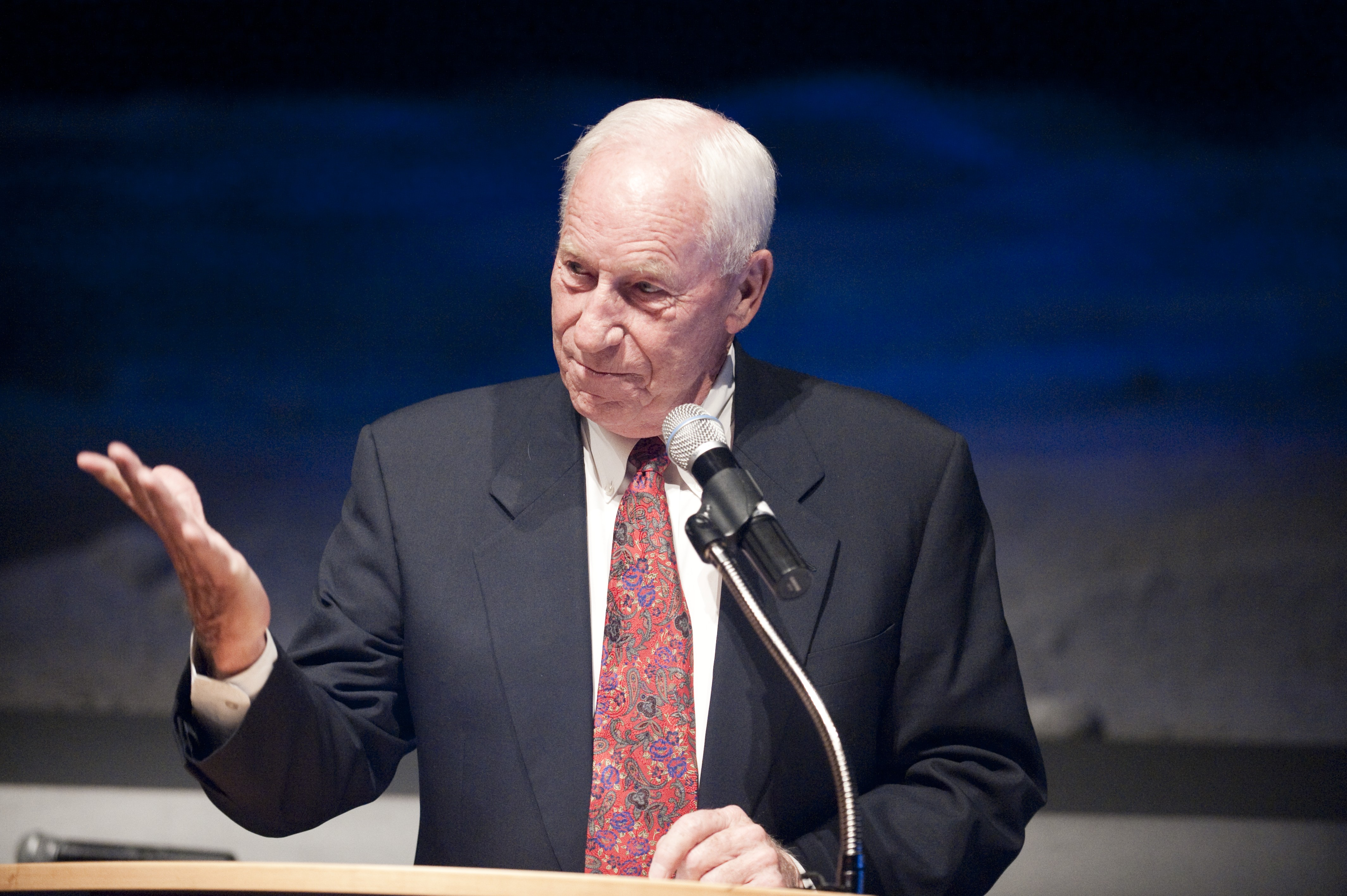
Worden receiving NASA's Ambassador of Exploration Award in July 2009

After leaving the Air Force and NASA, Worden founded Alfred M. Worden, Inc., then served as the director of Energy Management Programs at the Northwood Institute in Midland, Michigan. In 1982, Worden ran for the United States House of Representatives in Florida's 12th congressional district but lost the Republican primary to state senator Tom Lewis. Despite the loss, Worden referred to his run as the high point of his life, "I thought that was a very important thing to do. I put everything into it and lost, but that is okay."

The Apollo 15 astronauts had been required to turn in, and NASA had retained, 298 of the postal covers carried aboard by Scott, as well as 61 more envelopes from the deal with Herrick; they were transferred to the National Archives in August 1973. It had been Worden's understanding that the covers would be returned once NASA's investigation was over, and in 1983 he sued the government. Believing it could not win, the government returned the covers and the 298 were divided by the three astronauts. Worden sold some of them to pay debts from his unsuccessful run for Congress.

Worden still believed other former astronauts looked at him askance because of the postal covers incident. In 1984, he began to involve himself with the Mercury Seven Foundation, set up by the original astronauts to provide scholarships for promising students in the sciences. Worden was at the time living near KSC and as the Mercury Seven aged, he and other later astronauts took on greater responsibilities. The organization's name was changed to the Astronaut Scholarship Foundation, and in 2005, Worden was elected to chair its board of directors. He served in that capacity until 2011.

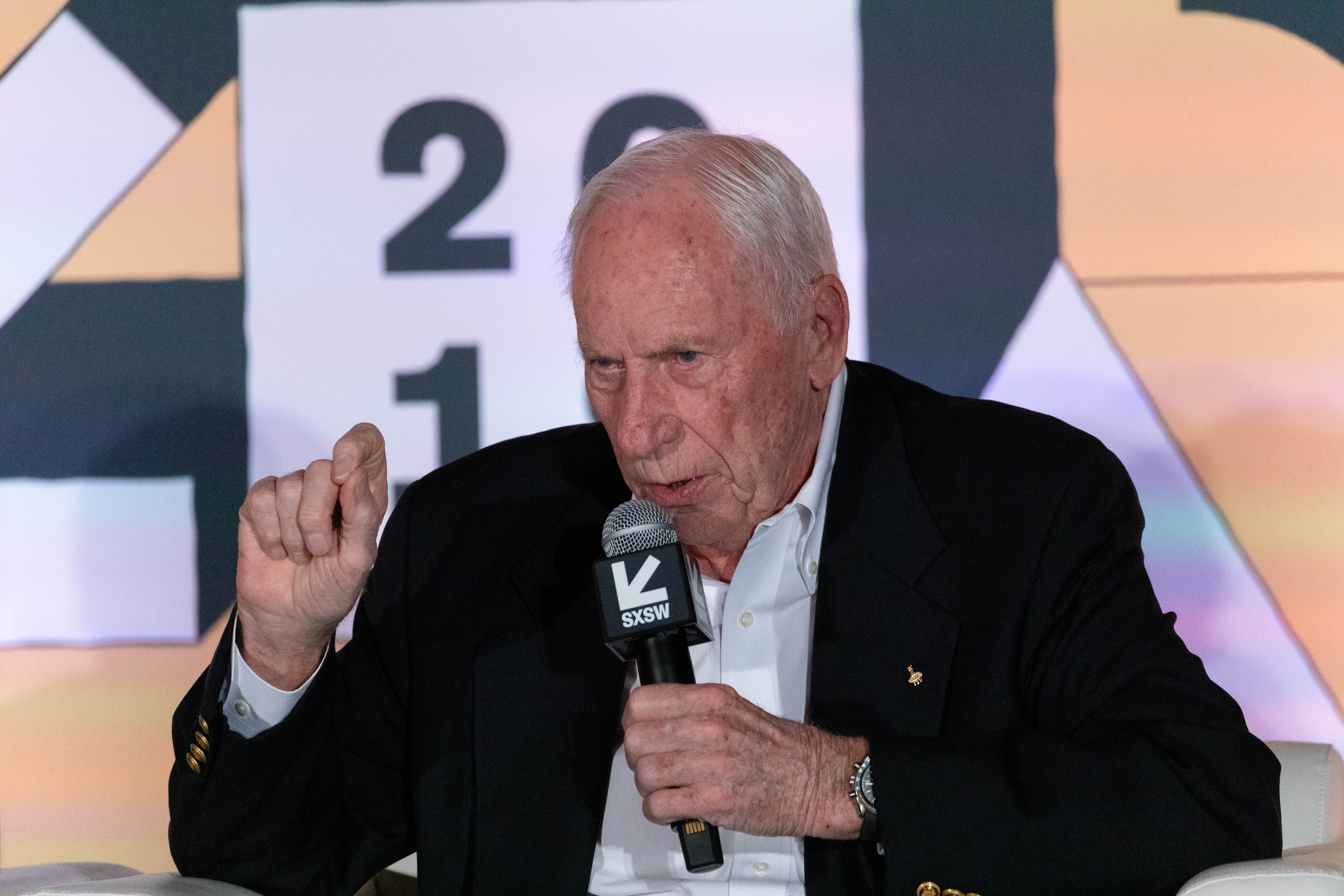
Worden in March 2019

Worden held executive positions with Jet Electronics and Technology, Inc., and with B.F. Goodrich prior to his retirement from the business world in 1996. In 2011, Worden's autobiography, Falling to Earth: An Apollo 15 Astronaut's Journey to the Moon made the top 12 of the Los Angeles Times Bestseller list. He also wrote Hello Earth: Greetings from Endeavour (1974), a collection of poetry, in 1974, and a children's book, I Want to Know About a Flight to the Moon (1974).

Widely known as "Al", Worden made many public appearances, and was one of the most approachable of the former astronauts, ready to chat over a vodka on the rocks. In 2018, Worden joined the Back to Space organization as an Astronaut Consultant with the goal of using film to inspire the next generation to go to Mars. Worden was a technical consultant to the 2018 film First Man, a biopic of Apollo 11's Neil Armstrong. 2019 saw the establishment of the Astronaut Al Worden Endeavour Scholarship to send "aspiring young space explorers" and their teachers to U.S. Space Camp in Alabama.

== Awards and honors ==
Worden received the NASA Distinguished Service Medal in 1971. He entered the International Space Hall of Fame in 1983. He was inducted into the United States Astronaut Hall of Fame in 1997. In 2009, Worden was honored with the NASA Ambassador of Exploration Award. He was inducted in 2016 into the International Air & Space Hall of Fame at the San Diego Air & Space Museum.

Worden and the other Apollo 15 crew members received the first United Nations Peace Medal in 1971. They also received the Robert J. Collier Trophy (1971), the Kitty Hawk Memorial Award (1971) and the AIAA Haley Astronautics Award (1972). He received an Honorary Doctor of Science degree in Astronautical Engineering from the University of Michigan in 1971.

== Personal life and popular culture ==
Worden married Pamela Vander Beek, whom he met on a blind date while a cadet, in June 1955. The couple divorced in December 1969, just before Worden was selected to fly on Apollo 15. Worden became the first astronaut to divorce during the program and thereafter fly in space. (Note: Irwin had also had a divorce; no divorced astronaut flew in space before Apollo 15.) Al and Pamela Worden lived across the street from each other following the separation, and he remained involved in their daughters' lives. He was initially shunned by the Astronaut Wives Club but in time this ended.

In September 1974 he married Sandra Lee Wilder; they divorced in January 1980. Worden married Jill Lee Hotchkiss in July 1982. She died in May 2014. He had two daughters with Pamela Worden, Merrill and Alison, and one stepdaughter, Tamara, from his third marriage. Worden's recreational interests included bowling, water skiing, golf, racquetball and playing the piano.

In the 1998 HBO miniseries From the Earth to the Moon Worden was played by Michael Raynor.

== Death ==
Hello Earth! Your life is finite.
Does the answer lie out here?
If we don't resolve our problems,
Life on Earth may be too dear.

— Alfred M. Worden

Alfred Worden died on March 18, 2020, at an assisted living center in Sugar Land, Texas. He was 88 years old. Worden had been suffering from an infection at home in League City, Texas for which he was hospitalized at Texas Medical Center in Houston. He was convalescing at the Sugar Land facility at the time of his death.

The tributes to Worden upon his death were many. NASA Administrator Jim Bridenstine stated, "Al was an American hero whose achievements in space and on Earth will never be forgotten." Apollo 11's Buzz Aldrin, a fellow West Point graduate, tweeted, "'Line of Grey, Be Thou at Peace!' Godspeed Al." Tom Kallman, president of Kallman Worldwide, Inc., with whom Worden had worked in setting up the Astronaut Al Worden Endeavour Scholarship Foundation, noted, "Though he was focused on STEM, Al's principal message was always to 'follow your passion, wherever that leads you'." Mike Pence, Vice President of the United States, stated, "We stand on the shoulders of space pioneers like Al, and America will always marvel at his achievements and look to him for inspiration as we strive to go farther and faster than ever before."

A celebration of Worden's life took place on September 19, 2020. This was originally to be a hybrid in-person/online event, but due to the COVID-19 pandemic was postponed and made online only. Those paying tribute to Worden included fellow Group 5 astronauts Duke, Haise and Jack Lousma.

== Books ==
- Hello Earth; Greetings from Endeavour, Nash Publishing (1974), ISBN 978-0-8402-1343-3
- I Want to Know About a Flight to the Moon, Doubleday (1974), ISBN 978-0-385-05837-7
- Falling to Earth: An Apollo 15 Astronaut's Journey to the Moon with Francis French, Smithsonian Books (2011), ISBN 978-1-58834-309-3
- Astronaut Al Travels to the Moon with Francis French, Illustrated by Michelle Rouch, Bookpress Publishing (2021), ISBN 978-1-94730-527-4
- The Light of Earth: Reflections on a Life in Space with Francis French, University of Nebraska Press (2021), ISBN 978-1-49622-865-9

== See also ==
- List of spaceflight records
- The Astronaut Monument

== Sources ==
- Chaikin, Andrew (1995) [1994]. A Man on the Moon: The Voyages of the Apollo Astronauts. New York, NY: Penguin Books. ISBN 978-0-14-024146-4.
- French, Francis; Burgess, Colin (2010) [2007]. In the Shadow of the Moon. Lincoln, NE: University of Nebraska Press. ISBN 978-0-8032-2979-2.
- Jurek, Richard (2019). The Ultimate Engineer: The Remarkable Life of NASA's Visionary Leader George M. Low. Lincoln, NE: University of Nebraska Press. ISBN 978-1-4962-1847-6.
- Orloff, Richard W.; Harland, David M. (2006). Apollo: The Definitive Sourcebook. Chichester, UK: Praxis Publishing Company. ISBN 978-0-387-30043-6.
- Scott, David; Leonov, Alexei (2004). Two Sides of the Moon: Our Story of the Cold War Space Race. New York: Thomas Dunne Books. ISBN 978-0-7434-5067-6.
- Shayler, David J.; Burgess, Colin (2017). The Last of NASA's Original Pilot Astronauts: Expanding the Space Frontier in the Late Sixties. Chichester, UK: Springer. ISBN 978-3-319-51014-9.
- Slayton, Deke; Cassutt, Michael (2011) [1994]. Deke! (First E-book ed.). New York: Forge. ISBN 978-1-466-80214-8.
- Ulman, Leon (1981), "78-64 Memorandum Opinion for the Assistant Attorney General, Civil Division", in Ulman, Leon (ed.), Opinions of the Office of Legal Counsel (January 11, 1978 – December 31, 1978), vol. 2, Washington, DC: United States Government Printing Office, pp. 281–289, ISBN 978-0-936502-00-7
- United States Senate Committee on Aeronautics and Space Sciences (August 3, 1972). "Commercialization of Items Carried by Astronauts". United States Senate.
- Winick, Les (1973). "The Apollo 15 Cover Story". COMPEX. Chicago, IL: Combined Philatelic Exhibition of Chicagoland, Inc.: 71–89.
- Worden, Al; French, Francis (2011). Falling to Earth: An Apollo 15 Astronaut's Journey to the Moon. Washington, DC: Smithsonian Books. ISBN 978-1-58834-310-9.
- Worden, Al; French, Francis (2021). The Light of Earth: Reflections on a Life in Space (eBook ed.). Lincoln, NE: University of Nebraska Press. ISBN 978-1-4962-2865-9.
