= In the Shadow of the Moon =

In the Shadow of the Moon may refer to:

- Shadow of the Moon
- In the Shadow of the Moons, 1998 autobiographical account of life among the family of Sun Myung Moon
- In the Shadow of the Moon (book), 2007 nonfiction account of U.S. and Soviet lunar research programs
- In the Shadow of the Moon (2007 film), British documentary about U.S. missions to the Moon
- In the Shadow of the Moon (2019 film), science fiction thriller
