= Melanie Fullerton =

American actress

- Born: Melanie Lorene Fullerton; August 29, 1962 (age 63); Kansas City, Missouri, United States of America
- Occupation: Actress
- Years active: 1969 - 1974
- Spouse: Brett Kerr (1991)

Melanie Fullerton (born August 29, 1962) is an actress in the late 1960s and early 1970s. She co-starred in Night of the Lepus (1972) with Stuart Whitman and in To Rome With Love (1969-1971) with John Forsythe, Vito Scotti, Joyce Menges, and Susan Neher.

Fullerton was born in Kansas City, Missouri.

== Filmography ==
Year	Title	Role	Notes
1969-1971	To Rome With Love	Pokey Endicott	48 episodes
1972	Night of the Lepus	Amanda Bennett	
1974	The Gun and the Pulpit	Emma Underwood	TV movie, Uncredited, (final appearance)
