= To Rome with Love =

To Rome with Love may refer to:

- To Rome with Love (TV series), an American sitcom
- To Rome with Love (film), a 2012 magical realist romantic comedy film
