= The Naked Island (book) =

Memoir by Russell Braddon

The Naked Island is a 1952 memoir by Russell Braddon about his time as a prisoner of war in Changi, Singapore during World War II. It sold over two million copies and has come to be regarded as a classic of Australian literature. It was also adapted into a play and led to a sequel. The book was illustrated by Ronald Searle, who had himself been a Japanese prisoner of war.

== Play ==
The play version debuted at the Union Theatre in Sydney on 18 January 1962 as part of a series of three new Australian plays under the auspices of the Australian Elizabethan Theatre Trust. The others were Shipwreck by Douglas Stewart and The Break by Philip Albright.

Critical reception was mixed.

== Radio ==
The novel was adapted for radio on the ABC in 1961 and 1963.

== TV Adaptation ==
The novel was adapted for British television in 1965.

It screened in the US in June 1970.

=== Premise ===
The time is August 1945, the place is the infamous Changi Jail in Japanese occupied Singapore. In the last few days of the war five Australian POW's are faced with summary execution. It is their job to pass on the news to the rest of the camp to ensure the success of a planned breakout.

=== Cast ===
- Ray Barrett as Jacko
- James Bolam as Magpie
- John Breslin as Oscar
- Lewis Fiander as Ken
- Burt Kwouk as Yamomoto
- Barry Lowe as Robbie
- Alan White as Mum
