= Hugh V. Clarke =

Australian writer

Hugh Vincent Clarke (27 November 1919 – 28 November 1996) was an Australian soldier, public servant and author, specialising in military history.

Born in Brisbane, Queensland, on 27 November 1919, Clarke was a cadet surveyor with the Queensland Main Roads Commission. He left the commission to enlist in the 2/10th Field Regiment, 8th Division in July 1940. He served as a bombardier in Malaya and in Singapore before being taken prisoner by the Japanese after the fall of Singapore in February 1942. He was imprisoned in Changi Prison and also forced to work on the infamous Thai-Burma Railway.

After the war, Clarke joined the Commonwealth Public Service and became Director of Information and Public Relations for the Department of External Affairs in Canberra. He retired because of ill health in 1976. He was married with five children.

== Bibliography ==
- — (1963). The Tub. Brisbane: Jacaranda Press. ISBN 1-86340-265-9.
- — (1965). Fire One! Midget Submarines Attack Sydney and Mass Breakout at Cowra. Sydney: Horwitz Publications. ISBN 0-207-13620-3.
- —; Yamashita, Takeo (1966). To Sydney By Stealth. Melbourne: Horwitz.
- — (1974). The Long Arm: A Biography of a Northern Territory Policeman. Canberra: Roebuck Society. ISBN 0-909434-03-4.
- — (1982). The Broke and the Broken: Life In the Great Depression. Spring Hill, Queensland: Boolarong. ISBN 0-908175-43-4.
- — (1984). Last Stop Nagasaki!. Sydney: George Allen & Unwin. ISBN 0-868614-12-2.
- — (1985). Twilight Liberation: Australian Prisoners of War between Hiroshima and Home. Sydney: Allen & Unwin. ISBN 0-868615-18-8.
- — (1986). A Life for Every Sleeper: A Pictorial Record of the Burma-Thailand Railway. Sydney: Allen & Unwin. ISBN 0-049090-23-2.
- —; Colin, Burgess; Russell, Braddon (1988). Prisoners of War. Sydney: Time-Life Books. ISBN 0-949118-25-7.
- — (1990). When the Balloon Went Up: Short Stories from a War. Illustrations by Verdon Morcom. Sydney: Allen & Unwin. ISBN 0-044422-09-1.
- —; Colin, Burgess (1992). Barbed Wire and Bamboo: Australian POWs in Europe, North Africa, Singapore, Thailand and Japan. St Leonards, New South Wales: Allen & Unwin. ISBN 1-86373-313-2.
- — (1994). Escape to Death: The Japanese Breakout at Cowra, 1944. Milson's Point, New South Wales: Random House Australia. ISBN 0-091827-76-0.
