= When the Enemy Is Tired =

1968 novel by Russell Braddon

- Front cover (publ. Michael Joseph)
- Author: Russell Braddon
- Language: English
- Publisher: Michael Joseph
- Publication date: 1968
- LC Class: PZ4.B7979 Wh

When the Enemy Is Tired is a 1968 novel by Russell Braddon.

== Plot ==
Colonel Anthony Russell, an officer in the Australian Army, is captured on a mission in China along with his squad of seven men. As the Chinese are excited by the possibilities of Russell defecting and broadcasting Communist propaganda, they assign Major Lim, a Chinese propaganda officer with a bitterness towards westerners – it is revealed later on that his parents were killed by a British soldier. Lim forces Russell to write his life story, in order to find out information that he will use in his efforts to brainwash him. In order to convince Russell he is serious, Lim drugs him into a sedated state, which makes Russell believe that he is witnessing the execution of his men. After it becomes clear that Russell will not broadcast and, following prompting by the Australian Government, Russell is sent back to Australia. As he leaves the plane he is intercepted by government officials and placed under arrest on suspicion of being a Communist spy. It is revealed that while he was a prisoner in China, he was subconsciously taught Russian; as a result of this, further suspicion falls on him. The book ends with the officials telling Russell to write his life story.

== Characters ==
Colonel Anthony Russell, the book's protagonist, was incarcerated in Changi Prison in the second world war and was prompted to join the Australian Army in the 70s after the death of his son in Vietnam.

Major Lim – Officer in the Chinese Army, he claims to have been educated in Australia.

== Critical reception ==
According to a review in the El Paso Times by Bart Lanier Stafford III, the book is "a relentlessly gripping novel by a master story teller."
