= Who's Minding the Store? =

1963 film by Frank Tashlin

- Directed by: Frank Tashlin
- Written by: Frank Tashlin; Harry Tugend
- Produced by: Paul Jones
- Starring: Jerry Lewis; Jill St. John; Agnes Moorehead; Ray Walston; Kathleen Freeman; John McGiver
- Cinematography: W. Wallace Kelley
- Edited by: John Woodcock
- Music by: Joseph J. Lilley
- Distributed by: Paramount Pictures
- Release date: November 28, 1963
- Running time: 90 minutes
- Country: United States
- Language: English
- Box office: 1,414,588 admissions (France)

Who's Minding the Store? is a 1963 American comedy film directed by Frank Tashlin and starring Jerry Lewis, Jill St. John, Agnes Moorehead, Ray Walston, Kathleen Freeman, and John McGiver. It was released on November 28, 1963, by Paramount Pictures.

== Plot ==
Rich Mrs. Phoebe Tuttle is upset that her daughter Barbara is engaged to a man beneath their social status, Norman Phiffier. Barbara has been keeping her heiress status to the Tuttle Department Store fortune a secret from Phiffier, knowing he is a proud person who refuses to marry her until he can afford to buy her a home.

Phiffier, a dog walker, is as awkward socially as he is physically. Mrs. Tuttle despises Phiffier but arranges for him to get a job at one of her stores. She directs the store manager, Quimby, to assign Phiffier a series of impossible and outrageous tasks, hoping he will become frustrated and quit, proving to her daughter that he is worthless. Instead, even though he suffers a series of hilarious mishaps, Phiffier becomes more driven and determined, and Quimby realizes that "he's a man of character". Phiffier also meets and befriends John Tuttle, Phoebe's henpecked husband, with neither suspecting each other's identity.

After a final spectacular failure involving a super-strong vacuum cleaner and a dog trapped inside it, Barbara's identity as an heiress is revealed. Disappointed by the Tuttles' deception, Phiffier breaks off the engagement and quits, returning to his previous job as dog walker. In this way he finally proves his worth to Mrs. Tuttle and, after she, John and Barbara temporarily join the dog-walking service to deliver their apologies to Phiffier, he and the Tuttles reconcile.

== Cast ==
- Jerry Lewis as Norman Phiffier
- Jill St. John as Barbara Tuttle
- Ray Walston as Mr. Quimby
- John McGiver as Mr. John P. Tuttle
- Agnes Moorehead as Mrs. Phoebe Tuttle
- Francesca Bellini as Shirley Lott
- Peggy Mondo as Lady wrestler
- Nancy Kulp as Emily Rothgraber
- John Abbott as Mr. Orlandos
- Isobel Elsom as Hazel, a Dowager
- Kathleen Freeman as Mrs. Glucksman
- Fritz Feld as Irving Cahastrophe, the Gourmet Manager
- Milton Frome as Francois, the Driver
- Mary Treen as Mattress Customer
- Dick Wessel as Traffic Cop (credited as Richard Wessel)

French actor Christopher Lambert appeared in an uncredited role in this movie.

== Production ==
Who's Minding the Store? was filmed from March 25 to May 22, 1963.

The scene in which Fritz Feld feeds Lewis a delicacy of fried ants actually contained genuine fried ants, a fact that Lewis was unaware of until after the scene was over.

In 2022, Jill St. John told Vanity Fair:

Comedy has always been my favorite medium. I was thrilled to be cast opposite Lewis…. Like many, I considered him a comedy genius. Still do. Unfortunately, one should not confuse the artist with the man. Making the film was an extremely unhappy and disappointing experience. Rather than detail my previous bitterness about filming with someone no longer on this planet, and who cannot rebut, I prefer to say that a good time was not had by all.

== Reception ==
On Rotten Tomatoes, the film holds a 40% rating based on 5 reviews, with an average rating of 4.80/10.

== Home media ==
The film was released on DVD and Blu-ray Disc on March 27, 2012.

== Legacy ==
- The film's poster can be seen in the background of Lewis's film The Patsy, when Ina Balin gets into a phone booth to call his character, Stanley Belt.
- "The Typewriter" sequence became a regular part of Lewis' live stage repertoire and he performed it frequently when hosting The Muscular Dystrophy Telethon.
