= Getting Together =

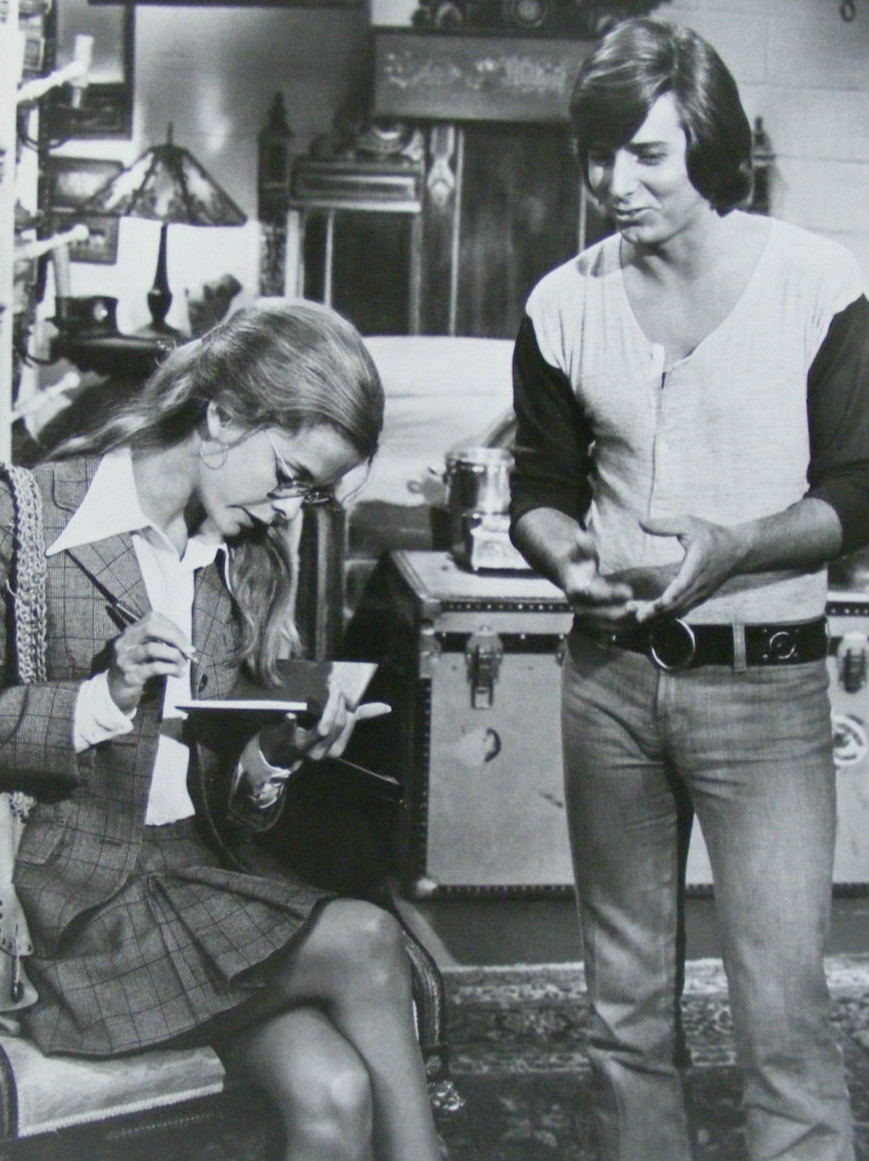
- Bobby Sherman and Diana Ewing (1971).
- Also known as: A Knight in Shining Armor
- Genre: Sitcom
- Created by: Bernard Slade
- Developed by: Charles Shyer; Alan Mandel
- Written by: Richard Baer; Dick Bensfield
- Directed by: Lou Antonio; Jerry Belson
- Starring: Bobby Sherman; Wes Stern; Jack Burns; Susan Neher; Pat Carroll
- Composer: George Duning
- Country of origin: United States
- Original language: English
- No. of seasons: 1
- No. of episodes: 14

Production
- Executive producer: Bob Claver
- Producer: Paul Junger Witt
- Running time: 30 minutes
- Production companies: Thornhill Productions; Screen Gems

Original release
- Network: ABC
- Release: September 18, 1971 – January 8, 1972

Related
- The Partridge Family

Getting Together is an American musical sitcom that aired on ABC during the 1971–72 U.S. television season. It starred Bobby Sherman and Wes Stern as Bobby Conway and Lionel Poindexter, a songwriting duo. The pilot for the series had aired the previous spring as the first-season finale episode of The Partridge Family named "A Knight in Shining Armor", in which Lionel and Bobby were introduced to each other by the Partridges. The unaired version of this episode, entitled "Words And Music", ran 33 minutes, and featured Farrah Fawcett and Pat Boone. The eight extra minutes of footage were filmed on March 15, 1971.

Sherman's and Stern's characters were reportedly based on the real-life songwriting team of Boyce and Hart, who had written hits for the Monkees ("Last Train to Clarksville", "Valleri"), Jay and the Americans ("Come a Little Bit Closer") and others. New music was a staple of the series, provided by much of the same team that had created the Partridge Family music. Most of these songs were from Sherman's album Getting Together, though a few songs were from his other albums (and some songs have never been released).

== Cast ==
- Bobby Sherman as Bobby Conway
- Wes Stern as Lionel Poindexter
- Susan Neher as Jennifer Conway
- Jack Burns as Officer Rudy Colcheck
- Pat Carroll as Rita Simon

== Episodes ==
No.	Title	Directed by	Written by	Original release date
1	"Jenny, Jenny"	Richard Kinon	Charles Shyer & Alan Mandel	September 18, 1971
Bobby is named his sister Jenny's legal guardian, but she runs away when she thinks that her presence is breaking up both his friendship and partnership with Lionel.
2	"Cathy's Clown"	Unknown	Unknown	September 25, 1971
Bobby decides that Lionel needs a new girlfriend in order to inspire his lyricist partner to write a better love song.
3	"All Shook Up"	Lou Antonio	Steve Zacharias	October 2, 1971
Bobby is shaken when he discovers that his younger sister Jenny is going to have her first date.
4	"Where Are You, Little Star?"	Ralph Senensky	Dennis Klein	October 9, 1971
When Bobby goes to Lionel's high school reunion, he discovers that Lionel has exaggerated the degree of their Hollywood success.
5	"Singing the Blues"	Jerry Bernstein	John D. F. Black	October 16, 1971
Bobby discovers a 10-year-old potential rock superstar, not realizing the pitfalls that await him.
6	"Why Do Fools Fall in Love?"	Richard Kinon	Richard Bensfield & Perry Grant	October 23, 1971
Bobby and Lionel try to convince Rita that she does not love a blind date that they have arranged for her.
7	"Beep, Beep"	Unknown	Unknown	October 30, 1971
Bobby and Lionel have opposite views of an accident they have witnessed and their arguments endanger their songwriting future.
8	"I Want You, I Need You, I Love You"	Hal Cooper	William S. Bickley	November 13, 1971
Unwittingly, Bobby double-crosses his partner by introducing Sandra to a rock superstar.
9	"Memories Are Made of This"	Roger Duchowny	Jack Winter	December 4, 1971
Because they need money to rent tuxedos, Bobby and Lionel enroll as human guinea pigs in a strange university experiment.
10	"Those Oldies But Goodies Remind Me of You"	Ralph Senensky	William S. Bickley	December 11, 1971
Nostalgia causes Bobby to give away his best song to an old rock and roll group (whose only hit was "Teenage Heaven") who are trying to make a comeback.
11	"Blue Christmas"	Jerry Bernstein	Richard Bensfield & Perry Grant	December 18, 1971
Bobby's plans to give Jenny an old-fashioned Christmas go awry.
12	"The Great Pretender"	Unknown	Unknown	December 25, 1971
After he meets an encyclopedia saleswoman, Bobby learns he should not have read his horoscope, which predicted he would fall in love.
13	"Breaking Up Is Hard to Do"	Lou Antonio	Richard Baer	January 1, 1972
Bobby and Lionel break up their songwriting partnership because of a misunderstanding.
14	"Broken-Hearted Melody"	Unknown	Unknown	January 8, 1972
When Lionel sells Bobby's bed to a pretty photographer, Bobby has to agree to get his hair cut for a commercial in order to get the bed back.

== Reception ==
Airing in the same time slot as breakout CBS hit All in the Family, the show never gained sufficient ratings and was canceled at midseason after 14 episodes. Though Getting Together is a spin-off of The Partridge Family, the series is not included in the parent show's DVD collections.
