= The Year of the Angry Rabbit =

1964 novel by Russell Braddon

- First edition
- Author: Russell Braddon
- Language: English
- Genre: Science fiction novel, Satire, horror, black comedy
- Publisher: Heinemann
- Publication date: 1964
- Publication place: Australia
- Media type: Print
- Pages: 180 pp

The Year of the Angry Rabbit is a science fiction novel by Australian author Russell Braddon, in which giant mutant rabbits run amok in Australia while the Prime Minister uses a new superweapon to dominate the planet.

The pulp narrative was played for laughs, and designed as an indictment of war, nationalism and capitalism. The novel was also notable as being part of a small revival of Australian science fiction in the 1960s. Its comic-horror tone was well received, and a movie version was released in 1972 titled Night of the Lepus – a straight-faced monster movie that dropped the humor of the book.

== Summary ==
Sir Alfred – who engineered Fitzgerald's election to prime minister – calls Fitzgerald one evening with a complaint: his Bludgerton property has been infested with rabbits that are immune to myxomatosis. Fearing another rabbit epidemic, Fitzgerald tasks Professor Welch and his scientists with inventing super myxomatosis, or Supermyx, to control the growing rabbit population. They test the first batch of Supermyx on a male and female rabbit, with disastrous results: Supermyx does not kill rabbits, and merely makes them savage, as if infected with rabies. Supermyx is, however, instantly lethal to humans, as demonstrated when Sir Alfred is brutally killed by the test cases, which then escape and turn the entire rabbit brood into flesh-rending Supermyx carriers.

In a temporary lapse of brilliance, Sir Alan Jacks suggests that Fitzgerald weaponize Supermyx and conquer the world. Fitzgerald does just that: after nuking the Bludgerton property to prevent the rabbit outbreak (and having the scientists committed so that word of the threat never comes to light), he has Supermyx bombs planted in every country; as a demonstration of power, he wipes out the entire populations of two countries who refuse to stop warring with each other. This results in total nuclear disarmament, the exile of all nuclear physicists to a doomed island, and an eventual end to conventional warfare. Wars soon become harmless arena games, heavily promoted like the Olympics. Fitzgerald has all weapon factories shut down, but this quickly threatens the world economy, so he decrees the factories continue producing weapons of warfare, which are then summarily dumped into the ocean. Surprisingly, Fitzgerald's seemingly ridiculous plans actually work: world peace finally becomes a reality for three years.

As Supermyx can’t travel over water, Australia is completely safe from its own superweapons; however, the Supermyx-carrying Bludgerton Rabbits (now giant from atomic radiation) refuse to go away, and keep resurfacing time and again, threatening to overwhelm Australia and wipe out its population. The rabbits eventually become too numerous to contain, and Australia wages a one-sided war against the numberless brood. Fitzgerald is killed, and the entire continent is evacuated, leaving Australia to the aborigines, who eventually summon a flood to destroy the rabbits. The novel ends with the implication that the remaining Supermyx bombs will detonate, wiping humanity from the face of the earth.

== Characters ==
Kevin Sean Aloysius "Ella" Fitzgerald: Prime Minister of Australia, and the novel's protagonist. An archetypal scheming politician.

Major General Sir Alan Jacks: Notoriously incompetent Minister of Defence whose predictions are always wrong, except for one temporary lapse of brilliance when he suggests using Supermyx as a world-dominating weapon.

Sir Alfred Hill G.C.B.: Wealthy landowner, habitual blackmailer, and the story's catalyst. After discovering oil on his property he used his wealth to dominate two boroughs (pocket boroughs), which won Fitzgerald the last election by a two-seat majority. When rabbits begin spawning on his property, Alfred threatens to use the same trick to lose Fitzgerald the next election if he can't find a way to get rid of the rabbits.

Professor Welch: Leader of the team that is tasked to develop Supermyxomatosis, in the hope of annihilating the rabbit plague on Sir Alfred's ranch.

Les Dorfmann: Welch's second-in-command, who becomes a hunted fugitive, and later becomes Fitzgerald's last hope at defeating the deadly rabbits.

Dr Miller: Assistant to professor Golovin, who helps Dorfmann escape the authorities, and later marries him.

Flo Hill, AKA "Ladyill": Wife of Sir Alfred, who Fitzgerald was once infatuated with.

Major Gary Cooper Hill: Son of Ladyill and Sir Alfred. Military man in the Australian army.

The Bludgerton Rabbits: Initially normal rabbits infesting Sir Alfred's Bludgerton property, they become savage plague-carriers when infected with Supermyx. They are the only thing that threatens Australia's total world dominance, and each time they resurface, they are larger, nastier, and more numerous.

== Background ==
Braddon said he wrote the book "as a joke" and said it took him four weeks to complete.
