= Peggy Mondo =

American actress (1927–1991)

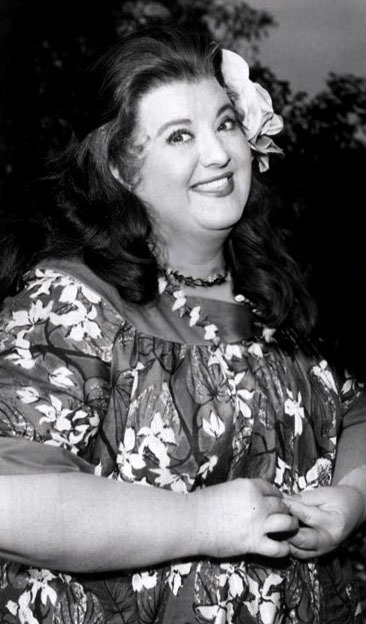
- Mondo as Little Flower in McHale's Navy (1963)
- Born: Marguerite Gloria Mondo; August 12, 1927; New Haven, Connecticut, United States
- Died: February 19, 1991 (aged 63); Los Angeles, United States
- Resting place: Forest Lawn Memorial Park, Hollywood Hills
- Occupation: Actress
- Years active: 1957–1980
- Spouse: John Stevens (m. 1962)

Peggy Mondo (born Marguerite Gloria Mondo; August 12, 1927 – February 19, 1991) was an American actress. Her early background included training as an opera singer before making her Broadway theatre debut in the 1957 musical The Music Man and later appeared in the 1962 film adaptation. Overweight since childhood, Mondo was typecast into roles that emphasized her obesity.

Having little success in losing weight, Mondo eventually embraced her figure and continued to play overweight characters. As well as several films, her work also spanned various television series, including The Addams Family, McHale's Navy, and To Rome with Love. Her career continued into the 1980s with her performance as cousin Tessie in the film Fatso.

== Early life and family ==
Mondo was born on August 12, 1927, in New Haven, Connecticut, United States. Her parents were Vincent Mondo and Emma Mondo (née Spignesi). Her father Vincent studied at the Yale School of Art, while her apartment was furnished with his many paintings, which he continued to create into his 70s. Mondo was of Italian ancestry and trained as an opera singer before becoming an actress.

== Career ==
Mondo made her theatrical debut on Broadway in the musical The Music Man, which had opened in December 1957, and later in the 1962 film version. She felt that her role in the productions typecast her into roles that emphasized her weight. Mondo had previously fought against her weight, in one year managing to lose 54 pounds (24 kg) through strict dieting. During filming of a scene in Who's Minding the Store?, where Mondo played a heavy wrestler, she was required leap over a sales counter onto a prosthetic dummy of co-star Jerry Lewis; however she nearly fell on top of him as he did not move away quickly enough. Mondo, who reportedly weighed 200 pounds (91 kg) at the time, appeared larger than usual due to wearing knee pads and additional protective gear.

By 1966 and weighing around 250 pounds (110 kg), Mondo had embraced her figure, remarking that she believed there was a niche for actresses who did not fit the conventional Hollywood mold; she considered there was competition for acting roles requiring "skinny actresses" and that she may lose work if she lost weight. She found acting opportunities on The Addams Family and McHale's Navy, the latter of which she appeared in 35 episodes. Other smaller roles included the daughter of an Indian chief in the 1966 Western television series Laredo. Mondo felt she was under-appreciated and was hopeful of being recognised by producers as a potential star. Contrary to her belief that overweight actresses attempted to disguise their figure, she embraced bright dresses, including sometimes wearing more than one at once. She was a regular cast member in the 1969 sitcom To Rome with Love, where she played the role of an Italian landlady Mama Vitale. She remarked that it was "the greatest role in the world to keep in shape for", referring to a desire to maintain an ample waist-line to suit the character. On one occasion, she cooked an Italian-style lunch of baked lasagna for the programme's cast and crew of around 61 people.

According to an obituary, her last professional performance was playing cousin Tessie in the 1980 film Fatso.

== Personal ==
Mondo married John Stevens in May 1962. They lived in a large 10-room Hollywood apartment with old-fashioned decor. The couple did not have any children. Mondo was close friends with fellow actor Ernest Borgnine.

Mondo died on February 19, 1991 of a heart attack in her Los Angeles home. She was interred in Forest Lawn Memorial Park in Hollywood Hills (her grave marker erroneously gives her birth year as 1940). She was survived by her brothers Peter, Louis and Vincent.

== Filmography and performances ==
Partial credits

- The Music Man (Theatre, 1957)
- The Music Man (1962)
- McHale's Navy (Television, 1962)
- Who's Minding the Store? (1963)
- The Addams Family (Television, 1964)
- Laredo (Television, guest appearance, 1966)
- Tammy (1966, one episode]
- To Rome with Love (Television, 1969–1971)
- Fatso (1980)
