= Francis French (author) =

English book and magazine author

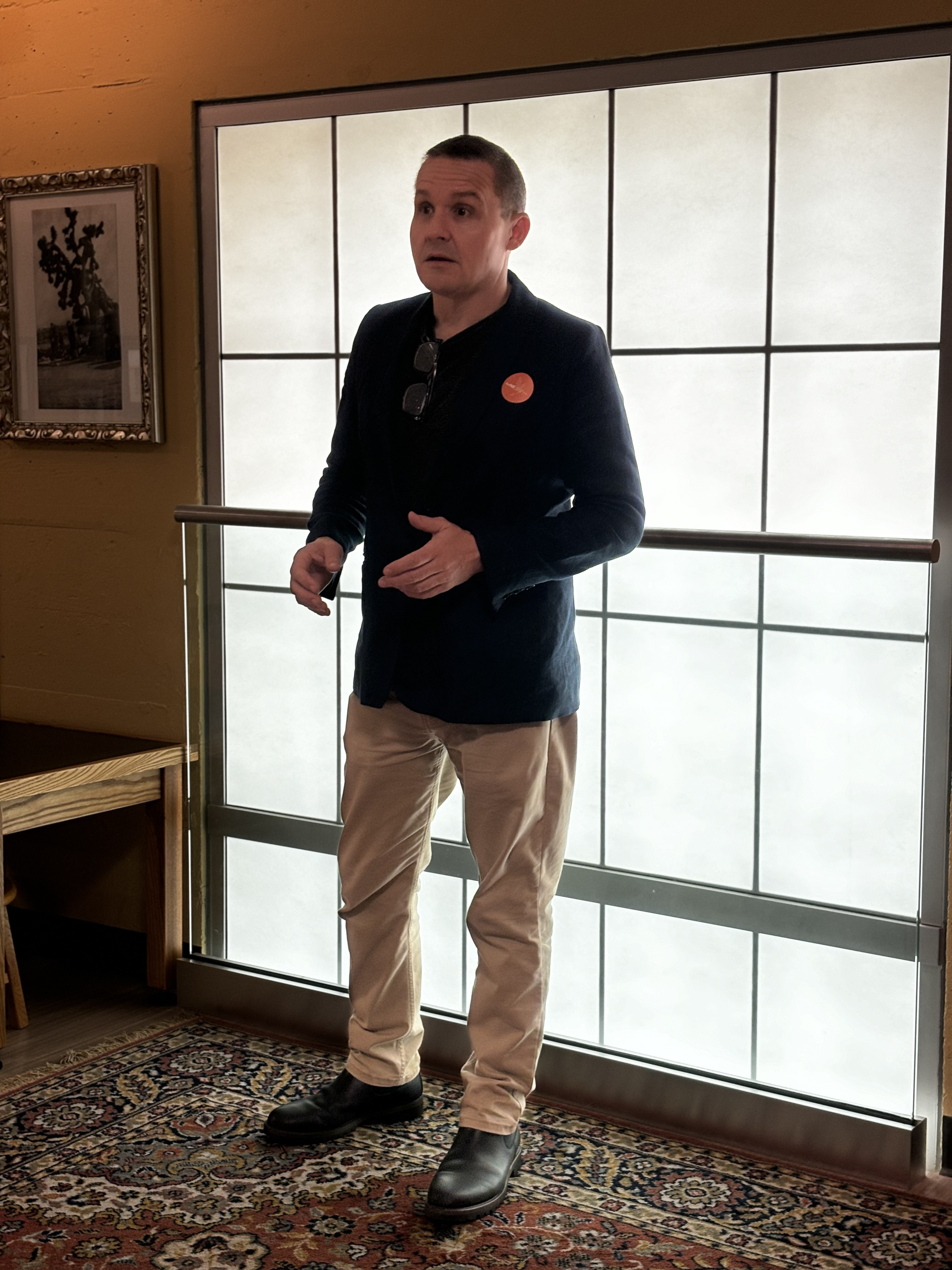
Francis French in December 2023

Francis French (born 1970) is a book and magazine author from Manchester, England, specialising in space flight history. He is a former director of events for Sally Ride Science, and a director at the San Diego Air & Space Museum.

French's space history books have been reviewed by the Smithsonian's Air & Space Magazine, The San Diego Union-Tribune, Jeff Foust of The Space Review, Student Life newspaper, Popmatters, Quest: The History of Spaceflight, Blogcritics, Space Times, Oxford Journals, Air Power History, Technology and Culture, Journal of Cold War Studies, Michelle Evans of the National Space Society, readers of collectSPACE, and Hugo Award nominee Steven H Silver of Silver Reviews, hosted by SF Site.

French's space history writing is noted for the amount of personal interviews with astronauts and cosmonauts, including Wally Schirra, Gordon Cooper, Scott Carpenter, and Pavel Popovich. In addition, French is a contributor to the magazine of the British Interplanetary Society, and is a Fellow of the society. In 2005, astronaut Wally Schirra personally inducted French into the astronaut branch of the Ancient Order of Turtles.

French has made appearances as a space expert on the Discovery Channel, History Channel, Science Channel, and The Space Show, as well as the BBC World Service, NPR's "All Things Considered," ABC and other international broadcast shows.

Both of French's 2007 books, Into That Silent Sea: Trailblazers of the Space Era, 1961–1965 and In the Shadow of the Moon: A Challenging Journey to Tranquility, 1965–1969 were named as finalists for the 2007 Eugene M. Emme Award given by the American Astronautical Society. The latter was also named as 2009 Outstanding Academic Title by the American Library Association's Choice magazine. In 2008, French received the AIAA "Outstanding Contribution to Aerospace Education" award, and the "Outstanding Community Support" award for San Diego from the National Space Society. In 2011, French's co-authored book "Falling To Earth" made the top 12 of the LA Times Bestseller list.

On 20 August 2010, French was inducted into the U.S. Space & Rocket Center's Space Camp Hall of Fame for his contributions to space history writing plus making science and technology accessible and understandable to family audiences. French joined notable names in space history in the Hall of Fame such as rocket pioneer Wernher von Braun and NASA astronaut Dottie Metcalf-Lindenburger.

In 2024, French's An Unlikely Astronaut, co-authored with Susan Kilrain, was read in space aboard the International Space Station.

In 2024 French was awarded an Honorary Doctorate of Education in recognition of his distinguished contribution to STEM and to education as a whole from Brunel University, London.

== Bibliography ==
- Into That Silent Sea: Trailblazers of the Space Era, 1961–1965, with Colin Burgess, 2007
- In the Shadow of the Moon: A Challenging Journey to Tranquility, 1965–1969, with Colin Burgess, 2007
- Astronomica, Ed. Fred Watson, 2007 (contributor)
- The Great Explorers, Ed. Robin Hanbury-Tenison, 2010 (Yuri Gagarin chapter)
- Falling to Earth: An Apollo 15 Astronaut's Journey to the Moon, with Al Worden, 2011
- Apollo Pilot, with Donn Eisele, 2016 (editor)
- Astronaut Al Travels to the Moon, with Al Worden and Michelle Rouch, 2021
- The Light of Earth, with Al Worden, 2021
- An Unlikely Astronaut, with Susan Kilrain, 2023
