= Nansook Hong =

American writer (born 1966)

- Korean name
- Hangul: 홍난숙
- Hanja: 洪蘭淑
- RR: Hong Nansuk
- MR: Hong Nansuk

Nansook Hong (born 1966), is the author of the autobiography, In the Shadow of the Moons: My Life in the Reverend Sun Myung Moon's Family, published in 1998 by Little, Brown and Company. It gave her account of her life up to that time, including her marriage to Hyo Jin Moon, the first son of Unification Church founder and leader Sun Myung Moon and his wife Hakja Han Moon.

== Early life and education ==
Hong was born to prominent members of the Unification church. She was handpicked to be the wife of Sun Myung Moon's son, Hyo Jin Moon, at age fifteen and during her fifteen years of marriage, she bore five children while attending high school and Barnard College in Manhattan. Hong graduated from Barnard College in 1991.

== In the Shadow of the Moons ==
In the Shadow of the Moons: My Life in the Reverend Sun Myung Moon's Family is a 1998, non-fiction work by Hong and Boston Globe reporter Eileen McNamara, published by Little, Brown and Company (then owned by Time Warner). It has been translated into German and French.

Author and investigative reporter Peter Maass, writing in the New Yorker Magazine in 1998, said that their divorce was the Unification Church's "most damaging scandal", and predicted that her then unpublished book would be a "tell-all memoir". In October 1998, Hong participated in an online interview hosted by TIME Magazine, in which she stated: "Rev. Moon has been proclaiming that he has established his ideal family, and fulfilled his mission, and when I pinpointed that his family is just as dysfunctional as any other family - or more than most - then I think his theology falls apart."

In her review of the book for Cultic Studies Journal, Marcia Rudin said that due to Nansook Hong's position within the Moon family, her story cannot simply be dismissed by cult apologists as an atrocity tale. Rafael Martinez, the director of Spiritwatch Ministries, a Christian countercult movement organization, writes that the book is a "...painfully honest and personal reflection of her life as a bride to Hyo Jin, Moon's eldest son..."

== Hyo Jin Moon ==
Hyo Jin Moon (December 3, 1962 – March 17, 2008) was a musician, performer, and recording facility executive and the eldest son of Unification Church founder Sun Myung Moon and his wife Hak Ja Han. He was born in South Korea and grew up in the United States in New York State. He served as first president of the World Collegiate Association for the Research of Principles. For ten years Moon was head of the Unification Church-owned Manhattan Center Studios recording facility in New York City. He served as worldwide president of the student branch of Unificationism, World CARP (Collegiate Association for the Research of Principles).

On March 17, 2008, Moon died of a heart attack at the Moon family home in Hannam-dong in Seoul, South Korea. FFWPU North American Headquarters announced that his Seung-hwa (ascension) ceremony was held on March 19, 2008 at Cheongpyeong Heaven and Earth Training Center, and The Wonjeon (burial) ceremony was held at Paju Wonjeon later that day.
