= To Rome with Love (TV series) =

- Genre: Sitcom
- Created by: Joan O'Brien
- Directed by: Earl Bellamy; Frederick de Cordova; James Sheldon
- Starring: John Forsythe; Kay Medford; Peggy Mondo; Vito Scotti; Walter Brennan
- Composer: Frank De Vol
- Country of origin: United States
- Original language: English
- No. of seasons: 2
- No. of episodes: 48

Production
- Executive producer: Don Fedderson
- Producer: Edmund L. Hartmann
- Running time: 25 minutes
- Production company: Don Fedderson Productions

Original release
- Network: CBS
- Release: September 28, 1969 – February 24, 1971

To Rome with Love is an American sitcom that aired on CBS from September 28, 1969, to February 24, 1971.

== Synopsis ==
To Rome with Love is the story of widowed college professor Michael Endicott, who decided to leave his native Iowa following the death of his wife and accept a new position as an instructor at the American Overseas School of Rome. The culture shock of his children in reacting to their new environment, and to an extent, his own, provided the main humor in the series. Family situations provided most of the rest. Early on, much of this came from Endicott's single sister, Harriet, who followed them to Rome, apparently for the sole purpose of dissuading them from living there and cajoling them into returning to Iowa. Harriet soon departed, but her place was taken shortly afterward by Andy Pruitt, Endicott's father-in-law and the children's grandfather. He came to Rome for a brief visit, but wound up staying indefinitely.

== Broadcast history ==
Season	Time slot (ET)
1969–70	Sunday at 7:30 pm
1970–71	Tuesday at 9:30 pm (Episodes 1–15); Wednesday at 8:30 pm (Episodes 16–22)

== Episodes ==
=== Season 1 (1969–70) ===
No. overall	No. in season	Title	Directed by	Written by	Original release date
1	1	"Pilot"	Fred de Cordova	Edmund Hartmann	September 28, 1969
2	2	"Hello, Aunt Harriet"	Unknown	Unknown	October 5, 1969
3	3	"The Roman from Iowa"	Unknown	Unknown	October 12, 1969
4	4	"Goodbye Aunt Harriet"	Unknown	Unknown	October 19, 1969
5	5	"The Telephone"	Unknown	Unknown	November 2, 1969
6	6	"We Want to Go Home"	Unknown	Unknown	November 9, 1969
7	7	"A Palazzo Is Not a Home"	Unknown	Unknown	November 16, 1969
8	8	"The Long Road Home"	Unknown	Unknown	November 23, 1969
9	9	"A Secret Day"	Unknown	Unknown	November 30, 1969
10	10	"An Affair of Honor"	Unknown	Unknown	December 14, 1969
11	11	"And One More Spring"	Unknown	Unknown	December 28, 1969
12	12	"Anything Can Happen in Rome"	Unknown	Unknown	January 4, 1970
13	13	"A Gown for Alison"	James Sheldon	Elick Moll	January 11, 1970
14	14	"One Coin in the Fountain"	James Sheldon	Philip Rapp	January 18, 1970
15	15	"To Go Home Again"	Unknown	Unknown	January 25, 1970
16	16	"The Pied Piper of Rome"	Charles Barton	Blanche Hanalis	February 1, 1970
17	17	"My Daughter Penny"	Charles Barton	Blanche Hanalis	February 8, 1970
18	18	"Beautiful People"	Charles Barton	John McGreevey	March 1, 1970
19	19	"Birds, Bees and Romans"	Unknown	Unknown	March 8, 1970
20	20	"The Pretty Little Girl"	Unknown	Unknown	March 15, 1970
21	21	"Father's Choice"	Unknown	Unknown	March 29, 1970
22	22	"A Friend for Penny"	Unknown	Unknown	April 5, 1970
23	23	"Spring Vacation"	Unknown	Unknown	April 26, 1970
24	24	"West of Rome"	Unknown	Unknown	May 3, 1970
25	25	"Our Friend Gino"	Unknown	Unknown	May 10, 1970
26	26	"We Remember Mama"	Unknown	Unknown	May 17, 1970

=== Season 2 (1970–71) ===
No. overall	No. in season	Title	Directed by	Written by	Original release date
27	1	"Here Comes Andy"	Earl Bellamy	Robert Pirosh	September 15, 1970
28	2	"A Day in the Country"	Unknown	Unknown	September 22, 1970
29	3	"Baby of the Family"	Unknown	Unknown	September 29, 1970
30	4	"Roman Affair"	Unknown	Unknown	October 6, 1970
31	5	"A Boy to Remember"	Unknown	Unknown	October 13, 1970
32	6	"Rome Is Where You Find It"	Unknown	Unknown	October 20, 1970
33	7	"Lire from Heaven"	Unknown	Unknown	October 27, 1970
34	8	"Grandpa in Charge"	Unknown	Unknown	November 10, 1970
35	9	"The Catnip Club"	Unknown	Unknown	November 17, 1970
36	10	"The Rose Garden"	Earl Bellamy	Unknown	November 24, 1970
37	11	"The Boy Next Door"	Unknown	Unknown	December 1, 1970
38	12	"The Runaways"	Unknown	Unknown	December 8, 1970
39	13	"Fly Away Home"	Unknown	Unknown	December 15, 1970
40	14	"Doctor Andy"	Unknown	Unknown	December 29, 1970
41	15	"Making the Scene"	Unknown	Unknown	January 5, 1971
42	16	"Bonzai or Bonsai"	Unknown	Unknown	January 13, 1971
43	17	"Beauty and the Judge"	Unknown	Unknown	January 20, 1971
44	18	"Age of Life"	Unknown	Unknown	January 27, 1971
45	19	"Mike and the Countess"	Unknown	Unknown	February 3, 1971
46	20	"The Stray Cat"	Unknown	Unknown	February 10, 1971
47	21	"Yankee Trader"	Earl Bellamy	Unknown	February 17, 1971
48	22	"Boy Meets Penny"	Earl Bellamy	Unknown	February 24, 1971

== Reception ==
Originally airing on Sunday nights, the show went up against ABC's Land of the Giants and NBC's The Wonderful World of Disney and never garnered the ratings CBS had hoped for. Also, Kay Medford as Aunt Harriet did not catch on with viewers and, as a result, was phased out of the series shortly after its premiere. Nevertheless, the network agreed to renew the show for a second season. To Rome With Love was switched to Tuesdays at 9:30 in September, 1970.

In order to give Forsythe a strong co-star, Walter Brennan joined the cast as Michael Endicott's father-in-law, Andy Pruitt. However, the second season did even worse than the first. In January, 1971, in an attempt to salvage the series, CBS shifted the show to Wednesdays to make room for a new CBS sitcom: All In The Family. The move did not help, and the series was canceled in the spring of 1971.

== Crossover episodes ==
"Roman Affair" (Season 2, Episode 4) features Anissa Jones and Johnnie Whitaker as their Family Affair characters Buffy and Jody, respectively. "Rome Is Where You Find It" (Season 2, Episode 6) features William Demarest, Don Grady and Tina Cole as Uncle Charley, Robbie Douglas and Katie Douglas respectively from My Three Sons. All three series were produced by Edmund Hartmann and Don Fedderson.

== Cast ==
- John Forsythe as Michael Endicott
- Kay Medford as Harriet Endicott (first season only)
- Walter Brennan as Andy Pruitt (second season only)
- Peggy Mondo as Mama Vitale
- Vito Scotti as Nico
- Joyce Menges as Alison Endicott
- Susan Neher as Penny Endicott
- Melanie Fullerton as Mary Jane "Pokey" Endicott
