= Russell Braddon =

Australian writer

- Born: Russell Reading Braddon; 25 January 1921; Sydney, New South Wales, Australia
- Died: 20 March 1995 (aged 74); Urunga, New South Wales, Australia
- Occupation: Novelist
- Military career
- Allegiance: Australia
- Branch: Australian Army
- Conflicts: World War II; Malayan campaign

Russell Reading Braddon (25 January 1921 – 20 March 1995) was an Australian writer of novels, biographies and TV scripts. His chronicle of his four years as a prisoner of war, The Naked Island, sold more than a million copies.

Braddon was born on 25 January 1921 in North Sydney, New South Wales. He was the son of Thelma Doris (née Reading) and Henry Russell Braddon. His father, a barrister, was the grandson of Tasmanian premier Edward Braddon.

Braddon enlisted in the Australian Army during World War II, serving in the Malayan campaign. He was held as a prisoner of war by the Japanese in Pudu and Changi prisons and on the Thailand-Burma Railway between 1942 and 1945. During this time he met Ronald Searle, whose Changi sketches illustrate The Naked Island.

After the war, he went on to study law at University of Sydney. Nevertheless, he failed to obtain a law degree (he maintained that he had lost interest in the subject) and he abandoned undergraduate life in 1948.

In 1949, Braddon moved to England after suffering a mental breakdown and followed by a suicide attempt. Doctors attributed this breakdown to his POW experiences, and urged him to take a year to recuperate. He described his writing career as "beginning by chance". The Naked Island, published in 1952, was one of the first accounts of a Japanese prisoner of war's experience.

Braddon went on to produce a wide range of works, including novels, biographies, histories, TV scripts and newspaper articles. In addition, he was a frequent broadcaster on British radio and television.

He met David Healy at a Christmas dinner in London in 1975. Healy remained his companion for the last twenty years of his life. He died in 1995 at his home in Urunga, New South Wales, having returned to Australia two years before.

Proud Australian Boy: A Biography of Russell Braddon by Nigel Starck was published in Australia in 2011.

== Works ==
Novels

- Those in Peril (1954)
- Out of the Storm (1956)
- Gabriel Comes to 24 (1958)
- The Proud American Boy (1960)
- The Year of the Angry Rabbit (1964)
- Committal Chamber (1966)
- The Inseparables (1968)
- When the Enemy Is Tired (1968)
- Will You Walk a Little Faster? (1969)
- Prelude and Fugue for Lovers (1971)
- Progress of Private Lilyworth (1971)
- End Play (1972)
- The Thirteenth Trick (1973)
- The Finalists (1977)
- The Predator (1980)
- Funnelweb (1990)

Non-fiction

- The Piddingtons (1950)
- The Naked Island (1952)
- Cheshire V.C: A Study of War and Peace (1954)
- Woman in Arms: The Story of Nancy Wake (1956)
  - UK ed. Nancy Wake: The Story of a Very Brave Woman (1956)
- End of a Hate (1958)
- Joan Sutherland (1962)
- Roy Thomson of Fleet Street (Collins, 1965)
- The Siege (1969)
- Suez: The Splitting of a Nation (1973)
- Hundred Days of Darien (1974)
- All the Queen's Men (1977)
- Japan Against the World (1983)
- The Other Hundred Years War (1983)
- Australia Fair? (1984)
- Thomas Baines and the North Australian Expedition (1987)
- Prisoners of War with Hugh Clarke and Colin Burgess (1988)

Broadcasts

- BBC The Piddingtons 1950: The Tower of London Broadcast: http://www.thepiddingtons.com/broadcasts.html
