= Susan Neher =

American actress (1959–2022)

- Born: Susan Marie Neher; February 22, 1959
- Died: August 2, 2022 (aged 63); Salem, Oregon, U.S.
- Occupation: Actress
- Years active: 1967–1974

Susan Marie Neher (February 22, 1959 – August 2, 2022) was an American actress, active as a child, best known for originating the role of Joanie Cunningham on Happy Days in its first iteration as a segment of the anthology series Love, American Style. She also played the sister of Bobby Sherman in his one-season series Getting Together as well as the daughter of John Forsythe in the series To Rome With Love.

From the 1980s, Neher, who later used the first name Suzanna, spent considerable time volunteering for a variety of social organizations in and around Pasadena, California, including the Los Angeles Free Clinic and AbilityFirst. Regarding her life, the former child actor stated "I've had the coolest life ever." Neher died in Salem, Oregon on August 2, 2022, at the age of 63.

== Filmography ==
=== Television series ===
1967 Family Affair as Sue Jeanette Minter Episode "Freddie" (S2 Ep.11).

- 1968: Family Affair as Lana. Episode "The Latch Key Kid" (S3EP1).
- 1969–1971: To Rome With Love as Penny Endicott
- 1971–1972: Getting Together as Jennifer Conway
- 1972: Love American Style as Joanie Cunningham
- 1972–1973: The Partridge Family as Gwen/Girl (two episodes)
- 1974: Paul Sand in Friends and Lovers as Audrey Ackerman (one episode)
