= Into That Silent Sea =

Book by Francis French and Colin Burgess

- Author: Francis French, Colin Burgess
- Language: English
- Genre: History
- Publication date: 2007

Into That Silent Sea: Trailblazers of the Space Era 1961–1965 is a 2007 non-fiction book by space historians Francis French and Colin Burgess. Drawing on a number of original personal interviews with astronauts, cosmonauts and those who worked closely with them, the book chronicles the American and Russian programs from 1961 onwards, from the first human spaceflight of Yuri Gagarin through the Mercury, Vostok and Voskhod flights, up to the first spacewalk by Alexei Leonov.

The book is the first volume in the Outward Odyssey spaceflight history series by the University of Nebraska Press. The space program history continues chronologically in the follow-on book In the Shadow of the Moon: A Challenging Journey to Tranquility, 1965–1969. Into That Silent Sea was named as a finalist for the 2007 Eugene M. Emme Award given by the American Astronautical Society.
