= Colin Burgess (author) =

Australian writer (born 1947)

Colin Burgess (born March 1947) is an Australian author and historian, specializing in space flight and military history. He is a former customer service manager for Qantas Airways, and a regular contributor to the collectSPACE online community. He lives in New South Wales.

Two of Burgess's co-authored 2007 books, Into That Silent Sea: Trailblazers of the Space Era, 1961–1965 and In the Shadow of the Moon: A Challenging Journey to Tranquility, 1965–1969 were named as finalists for the 2007 Eugene M. Emme Award given by the American Astronautical Society.

In the Shadow of the Moon was also named as "2009 Outstanding Academic Title" by Choice Magazine.

== Bibliography ==
- Aircraft, 1985
- Pioneers of Flight, 1988
- Prisoners of War, with Hugh Clarke and Russell Braddon, 1988
- Laughter in the Air: Tales from the Qantas Era, with Max Harris, 1988
- More Laughter in the Air: Tales from the Qantas Era, 1992
- Barbed Wire and Bamboo: Australian POW Stories, with Hugh Clarke, 1993
- Freedom or Death : Australia's Greatest Escape Stories from Two World Wars, 1994
- Destination Buchenwald, 1995. Revised and expanded edition published 2022
- The Diggers of Colditz: the classic Australian POW escape story now completely revised and expanded, with Jack Champ, 1997 and 2019
- Australia's Dambusters: The Men and Missions of 617 Squadron, 2003, re-released in 2021
- Bush Parker: An Australian Battle of Britain Pilot in Colditz, 2007, ISBN 098032047X
- Space, the New Frontier, 1987
- Oceans to Orbit: The Story of Australia's First Man in Space, Paul Scully-Power, 1995
- Australia's Astronauts: Three Men and a Spaceflight Dream, 1999
- Teacher In Space: Christa McAuliffe and the Challenger Legacy, 2000, revised edition 2020
- Fallen Astronauts: Heroes Who Died Reaching for the Moon, with Kate Doolan, 2003. Revised expanded edition, 2016
- NASA's Scientist-Astronauts, with David Shayler, 2006
- Animals In Space: From Research Rockets to the Space Shuttle, with Chris Dubbs, 2007
- Into That Silent Sea: Trailblazers of the Space Era, 1961–1965, with Francis French, 2007
- In the Shadow of the Moon: A Challenging Journey to Tranquility, 1965–1969, with Francis French, 2007
- Astronomica, Ed. Fred Watson, 2007 (contributor)
- The First Soviet Cosmonaut Team: Their Lives and Legacies, with Rex Hall, 2009
- Australia's Astronauts: Countdown to a Spaceflight Dream, 2009
- Footprints in the Dust: The Epic Voyages of Apollo, 1969–1975, 2010
- How Wickie Saved the World, 2010
- Selecting the Mercury Seven: The Search for America's First Astronauts, 2011
- Moon Bound: Choosing and Training the Lunar Astronauts, 2012
- Freedom 7: The Historic Flight of Alan B. Shepard, Jr., 2014
- Liberty Bell 7: The Suborbital Mercury Flight of Virgil I. Grissom, 2014
- Friendship 7: The Epic Orbital Flight of John H. Glenn, Jr., 2015
- Aurora 7: The Mercury Space Flight of M. Scott Carpenter, 2015
- Interkosmos: The Eastern Bloc's Early Space Program, 2015
- Sigma 7: The Six Mercury Orbits of Walter M. Schirra, Jr., 2016
- Faith 7: L. Gordon Cooper, Jr. and the Final Mercury Mission, 2016
- The Last of NASA's Original Pilot Astronauts: Expanding the Space Frontier in the Late Sixties, with David J. Shayler, 2017
- Shattered Dreams: The Lost or Canceled Space Missions, 2019
- NASA's First Space Shuttle Astronaut Selection: Redefining the Right Stuff, 2020
- Australia's Greatest Escapes: Gripping Tales of Wartime Bravery, 2020
- The Greatest Adventure: A History of Human Space Exploration, 2021
- Soviets in Space: Russia's Cosmonauts and the Space Frontier, 2022
- Sisters in Captivity: Sister Betty Jeffrey OAM and the courageous story of Australian Army nurses in Sumatra, 1942-1945, 2023
- Australia's Aviation Heroes: True Stories From Our Airmen At War, 2025
- Sisters Under Fire:The Extraordinary Courage of Two Australian Nurses at War, 2026
- Portraits of Corage: Inspiring True Stories of Heroic Australian Women in Times of War, 2027
