= In the Shadow of the Moon (book) =

Book by Francis French and Colin Burgess

In The Shadow of the Moon
- Front cover of the US first hardcover edition of In the Shadow of the Moon: A Challenging Journey to Tranquility.
- Author: Francis French; Colin Burgess
- Language: English
- Genre: Science
- Publisher: University of Nebraska Press
- Publication date: September 2007
- Publication place: United States
- Media type: Print (Hardcover)
- Pages: 448 pp (hardcover)
- ISBN: 978-0-8032-1128-5 (hardcover edition)
- OCLC: 77520721
- Dewey Decimal: 629.45/4 22
- LC Class: TL789.8.U6 A5337 2007
- Preceded by: Into That Silent Sea

In the Shadow of the Moon: A Challenging Journey to Tranquility is a 2007 non-fiction book by space historians Francis French and Colin Burgess. Drawing on a number of original personal interviews with astronauts, cosmonauts and those who worked closely with them, the book chronicles the American and Soviet programs from 1965 onwards, through the Gemini, Soyuz and early Apollo flights, up to the first landing on the Moon by Apollo 11.

The book is the second volume in the Outward Odyssey spaceflight history series by the University of Nebraska Press.

Although the book shares its name with a documentary, and both include many original interviews with Apollo lunar astronauts, it is neither a source of, nor a tie-in to, the documentary.

The book was named as a finalist for the 2007 Eugene M. Emme Award for Astronautical Literature given by the American Astronautical Society, and named as "2009 Outstanding Academic Title" by Choice magazine.
