= Verville Fellowship =

US-based scholarship

The A. Verville Fellowship is an American senior scholarship established in the name of aviation pioneer Alfred V. Verville at the Smithsonian Institution's National Air and Space Museum. The Verville Fellowship is a competitive nine- to twelve-month in-residence fellowship for researching the history of aviation. The fellowship includes a $50,000 stipend with limited additional funds for travel and miscellaneous expenses.

The program guidelines encourage candidates to pursue research and writing programs that appeal to an audience with broad interests while maintaining a professional tone. Outstanding manuscripts resulting from this program may be offered to the Smithsonian Institution Press for publication.

== Fellowship selections ==
- 2023-2024 - Sean Seyer - The Specter of Monopoly: The Conspiracy Theory that Shaped American Aviation, 1917-1949
- 2021-2022 - Alan Meyer - researching the lack of African American pilots in the industry
- 2016-2017 - Takashi Nishiyama
- 2015-2016 - Steven E. Harris - Wings of the Motherland: Soviet and Russian Cultures of Aviation from Khrushchev to Putin
- 2014-2015 - Alexander C.T. Geppert
- 2012-2013 - Richard Paul - NASA's role in the civil rights movement
- 2011-2012 - Anke Ortlepp - Jim Crow Terminals: The Desegregation of Airports in the American South
- 2010-2011 - Monique Laney - Transnational Migration and National Memory: How German Rocket Engineers Became Americans in Huntsville, Alabama
- 2009-2010 - Debbora Battaglia
- 2008-2009 - Evelyn Crellin
- 2007-2008 - Richard Hallion, Topic: Role of NACA Technical Representative John Jay Ide in air intelligence and the transfer of technical information between Europe and America
- 2006-2007 - Christine Yano, Topic: Airborne Dreams: Japanese American Stewardesses with Pan American World Airways, 1955-1972 (Durham, N.C.: Duke University Press, 2011).
- 2005-2006 - Dennis R. Jenkins, Topic: Escaping the Gravity Well: A Policy History of Space Access
- 2004-2005 - Neil M. Maher Topic: Ground Control: How the Space Race Scrubbed the 1960s Revolution
- 2003-2004 - Adnan Morshed
- 2002-2003 - Asif Azam Siddiqi - The Red Rockets’ Glare: Spaceflight and the Soviet Imagination (New York: Cambridge UP, 2010)
- 2001-2002 - Dwayne A. Day
- 2000-2001 - Alan R. Bender
- 1999-2000 - Carl Bobrow
- 1997-1998 - Dik A. Daso, retired curator of military aircraft at the Museum, wrote Hap Arnold and the Evolution of American Air Power (Washington, D.C.: SI Press, 2000)
- 1996-1997 - John R. Breihan
- 1991-1992 - Harold Andrews
- 1989-1990 - Daniel Ford
- 1988-1989 - Michael J. Neufeld - Von Braun, Collier's and Disney: Selling Space in the 1950s
- 1987-1988 - William Chana

== See also ==
- Charles A. Lindbergh Chair in Aerospace History
