= Dwayne A. Day =

American space historian

Dwayne Day
- Born: United States
- Occupations: Space historian, policy analyst
- Years active: 2000-present

Dwayne Allen Day is an American space historian and policy analyst and served as an investigator for the Columbia Accident Investigation Board.

Day is a senior program officer for the Aeronautics and Space Engineering Board of the National Research Council/National Academy of Sciences, where he has served as a study director on studies concerning NASA's aeronautics flight research capabilities, the planetary exploration program, the size of the astronaut corps, the threat of asteroids striking Earth, NASA workforce skills, radiation hazards to astronauts on long duration spaceflights, U.S. Air Force astrodynamics standards, and other projects. He previously served as a program officer on the Space Studies Board. He has also written extensively on the history of American satellite reconnaissance.

== Career ==
He received a doctorate degree in political science from The George Washington University where he specialized in space policy and management of the national security bureaucracy. His dissertation, "Mission Control," concerned how President Dwight D. Eisenhower created specialized bureaucracies to manage the ICBM, U-2 spyplane, and Corona spy satellite programs, thereby bypassing the cumbersome Air Force bureaucracy. From 2002 to 2003 he worked as the Congressional Budget Office Historian, where he wrote an unpublished history of the organization. In 2000, while under contract to the U.S. Air Force, he wrote a book on the U.S. Air Force Chief Scientist's Office. The book, Lightning Rod, detailed the creation, evolution, and influence of the senior scientific adviser to the uniformed leadership of the Air Force (the Air Staff).

Day has written many articles in space magazines including Spaceflight, Quest, Novosti Kosmonavtiki and other publications such as Space News. He is an associate editor of the German spaceflight magazine Raumfahrt Concret. Day published the book Eye in the sky about the CORONA spy satellite program, and was investigator for the Columbia Accident Investigation Board, where he focused on the policy, budgetary, managerial and institutional causes of the Columbia accident.

Day is regarded as one of a handful of experts on the history of the U.S. military space program, particularly American intelligence satellites. Among his contributions in this area is the first publication of a photograph of a satellite launched during a classified Space Shuttle launch, the first discussion of the evolution of the early American electronic intelligence satellite programs during the 1960s, and the first detailed discussion of the Satellite Data System communications relay satellites used by the National Reconnaissance Office. He has also written extensively on the intelligence analysis of the Soviet space program during the Cold War, such as the Soviet effort to place a man on the Moon in competition with Apollo.

Day is also known as the originator of the "Von Braun Paradigm" theory. The theory is that American space policy has for decades followed a pattern largely established by von Braun in a series of articles published in the 1950s in Collier's magazine. The simplified theory is that American space leaders have sought to develop space capabilities in a series of steps: develop a space shuttle to construct and service a space station which is then used to establish a lunar base, ultimately leading to a human mission to Mars. The theory has been discussed in books and papers by space historians Howard McCurdy, Roger Launius, and Michael Neufeld.

Currently, he is a program officer at the Space Studies Board of the National Research Council in Washington, D.C. In that capacity, he has served as a study director for several studies for NASA. These studies include "Space Radiation Hazards and the Vision for Space Exploration," "Building a Better NASA Workforce: Meeting the Workforce Needs for the National Vision for Space Exploration," "Grading NASA's Solar System Exploration Program: A Midterm Report," "Opening New Frontiers in Space: Choices for the Next New Frontiers Announcement of Opportunity," and "Science Opportunities Provided by NASA's Constellation System." He was recently the study director of a study to assess detection and mitigation strategies for near-Earth object hazards which produced the report "Defending Planet Earth: Near-Earth-Object Survey and Hazard Mitigation Strategies," and co-study director of an analysis of radioisotope power systems for robotic spacecraft. He is currently assistant study director of the planetary science decadal survey. He is also currently study director of a study on the future of NASA's spaceflight crew office, and a study of NASA's flight research projects, both for the Aeronautics and Space Engineering Board.

Day is a regular contributor to The Space Review, writing on subjects such as the Blackstar spaceplane, and the Chinese space programme. He also quoted a 1974 memo from the CIA Director complaining about Skylab photography of Area 51:

“The issue arises from the fact that the recent Skylab mission inadvertently photographed” the airfield at Groom Lake. “There were specific instructions not to do this,” the memo stated, and Groom “was the only location which had such an instruction.” In other words, the CIA considered no other spot on Earth to be as sensitive as Groom Lake, and the astronauts had just taken a picture of it.

In November 2007, Day published an article containing the photograph that the Skylab 4 astronauts took of Groom Lake, the first time this photo appeared in a public document.

== Selected bibliography ==
- Eye in the Sky: Story of the Corona Spy Satellites, ISBN 1-56098-830-4
- Lightning Rod: A History of the Air Force Chief Scientist's Office, ISBN 1-4102-2057-5
