= Paw Patrol: The Mighty Movie (soundtrack) =

Paw Patrol: The Mighty Movie (Music from the Motion Picture)

Film score by Pinar Toprak
- Released: September 29, 2023
- Recorded: May 2023
- Studio: Ocean Way Nashville, Nashville, Tennessee
- Genre: Film soundtrack
- Length: 62:25
- Label: Paramount Music
- Producer: Pinar Toprak

Pinar Toprak chronology
Shotgun Wedding (2023)	Paw Patrol: The Mighty Movie (2023)

Paw Patrol: The Mighty Movie (Music from the Motion Picture) is the soundtrack to the 2023 film Paw Patrol: The Mighty Movie directed by Cal Brunker, a sequel to the 2021 film Paw Patrol: The Movie. The soundtrack featured original score composed by Pinar Toprak, which released on September 29, 2023, the same day as the film's theatrical release.

== Development ==
On January 25, 2023, Pinar Toprak was announced to compose the film's musical score, replacing Heitor Pereira from the first film. Toprak described it as a "truly exciting and joyful experience" on composing the film. Unlike the predecessor, which did not have a soundtrack release, the album for Toprak's score was released on September 29, 2023 through Paramount Music. The end credits revealed that the score recording took place at the Ocean Way Nashville, Nashville, Tennessee, in May 2023.

== Original songs ==
Additionally, three original songs were announced to be made for the film. Bryson Tiller performs "Down Like That", which was released by Trapsoul and RCA Records on September 8. Mckenna Grace performs "Bark to the Beat" with Blackbear, which was released by Photo Finish Records on September 15, while Christina Aguilera performs "Learning to Fly", which was released by RCA Records on September 22.

== Track listing ==
No.	Title	Length
1.	"PAW Patrol: The Mighty Movie"	0:37
2.	"Scorcher"	1:48
3.	"PAW Patrol to the Rescue"	3:31
4.	"All Junk to Begin With"	1:01
5.	"Looking Through the Telescope"	1:48
6.	"Meteor Crash"	1:51
7.	"Tower Destroyed"	1:28
8.	"Loading Meteor"	2:00
9.	"Skye Takes All the Crystals"	1:41
10.	"Glowing Meteor"	2:19
11.	"Skye Can Fly"	1:02
12.	"Superpowers!"	1:36
13.	"Wrecking Ball"	1:42
14.	"Very Important Mission"	2:41
15.	"Perfect Roommates"	1:49
16.	"Air Humdinger"	1:29
17.	"Mayday Call"	4:33
18.	"It Was a Trap"	1:08
19.	"I'd Do Anything"	4:36
20.	"Skye Captured"	2:38
21.	"Why Should I Care"	2:23
22.	"Skye's Gone"	1:24
23.	"Fighting Humdinger"	2:40
24.	"Rescuing Skye"	4:01
25.	"Fighting Victoria Vance"	2:20
26.	"Skye vs. Meteors"	5:39
27.	"Duty to Protect"	2:49
Total length:		62:25

== Reception ==
Courtney Howard of Variety wrote "Composer Pinar Toprak’s evocative score is complementary without being pushy, enhancing character drive." Out Loud Culture wrote that the score "enhances the experience".

== Credits ==
Credits adapted from Paramount Music.

- Score composer and producer: Pinar Toprak
- Music editor: Shie Rozow
- Assistant music editor: Peter Zongting Li
- Additional music and arrangements: Antonio Di Iorio and Emir Isilay
- Musical assistance: Ece Muniroglu
- Recorded at Ocean Way Nashville with the “Nashville Recording Orchestra”
- Ocean Way Nashville Operations Manager: Austin Atwood
- Ocean Way Nashville Business Manager: Jamie Warden
- Ocean Way Nashville Director: Joe Baldridge
- Orchestra Conducted by Anthony Parnther
- Additional Conductor: Philip Keveren
- Music Contractors: Zimmitti Music Group
- Score Recording Engineer: Nick Spezia
- Assistant Engineer and Pro Tools Operator: Katelyn Prieboy
- Score Mixed by: Alan Meyerson
- Mix Assistant: Michael Gossard
- Mixed at Ocean View Music
- Orchestrators: Zuzana Michlerová, Adam Klemens, Ana Kasrashvili and Bernhard P. Eder
- Additional Orchestration: Dominik Svoboda
- Copyists: Dominik Svoboda and Jiří Šimůnek
- Music Librarian: Brad Ritchie
- Soundtrack Album Coordinator: Michael Murphy
- Album Mastered by Jett Galindo

=== Musicians ===
- Violins: Dave Davidson • David Angell • Conni Ellisor • Karen Winklemann • Jenny Bifano • Alison Hoffman • Alicia Enstorm • Wei-Stun Chang • Katelyn Kelly • Rachel Englander • Alison McKelvey • Dayna Bee • Chuck Callahan • Kristin Weber • Kelsie Peppars • Carrie Bailey • Amy Helman • Eliza Cho • Jessica Blackwell • Hannah Borrells Tyler • Ben Plotnick • Avery Bright • Philip Ducreay • Collins McLaughlin • Laura Epling • Cassie Morrow • Annie Shaw • Julia Fisher • Matt Combs • Maddie Kasinger • Bruce Wethe
- Violas: Betsy Lamb • Monisa Angell • Seanad Chang • Razvan Berindean • Nicole Neely • Chris Lowry • Simona Rusu • Patrick Monnius • Tim Richardson • Josee Weigand
- Cellos: Sari Reist • Cremaine Booker • Austin Hoke • Nicholas Gold • Meghan Carey Berindean • Emily Rodgers • Alex Krew • Kaitlyn Raitz • Paul Miakhy
- Basses: Quentin Flowers • Tiffany Freeman • Ethan Jodziewicz • Jacob Jezioro • Jordan Wright • Sarah Ransom • Craig Nelson
- Flutes: Erik Gratton • Abigail Wick
- Oboes: Luke Simonson • Diana Dunn
- Clarinets: Emily Bowland • Spencer Prewitt
- Bassoons: Julia Harguindey • Jim Lotz
- French Horns: Jennifer Kummer • Leslie Norton • Patrick Walle • Radu Rusu • Anna Spina • Beth Beeson • Hunter Sholar
- Trumpets: Hunter Sholar • Jeff Bailey • Mike Haynes
- Trombones: Barry Green • Paul Jenkins • Matt Jefferson • Evan Clifton
- Tuba: Neil Konouchi
- Harp: Marcia Dickstein
- Electric Bass: Adam Blackstone
