= Eugene M. Emme Astronautical Literature Award =

Award

The Eugene M. Emme Award is an award given annually to a person or persons selected by a panel of reviewers from the American Astronautical Society History Committee to recognize "the truly outstanding book published each year serving public understanding about the positive impact of astronautics upon society." The award is in honor of Eugene M. Emme, NASA's first historian.

== List of recipients ==
Source: American Astronautical Society

- 2023 - No award given
- 2022 - Beyond Sputnik and the Space Race (Johns Hopkins University Press) by Hugh R. Slotten
- 2021 - The Burning Blue: The Untold Story of Christa McAuliffe and NASA’s Challenger Disaster (Henry Holt and Co.) by Kevin Cook
- 2020 - Operation Moonglow: A Political History of Project Apollo (Basic Books) by Teasel Muir-Harmony
- 2019
  - NASA and the Long Civil Rights Movement (University Press Florida) by Brian C. Odom and Stephen R. Waring
  - Moonbound: Apollo 11 and the Dream of Spaceflight (Hill & Wang) by Jonathan Fetter-Vorm
- 2018 - Ronald Reagan and the Space Frontier (Palgrave) by John Logsdon
- 2017 - Apollo in the Age of Aquarius (Harvard University Press) by Neil M. Maher
- 2016 (Awarded September 2017) - How to Make a Spaceship: A Band of Renegades, an Epic Race, and the Birth of Private Spaceflight (Penguin Press) by Julian Guthrie
- 2015 - German Rocketeers in the Heart of Dixie – Making Sense of the Nazi Past during the Civil Rights Era (Yale University Press) by Monique Laney
- 2014 - Mars Up Close: Inside the Curiosity Mission (National Geographic) by Marc Kaufman
- 2013 - Dreams of Other Worlds: The Amazing Story of Unmanned Space Exploration (Princeton University Press) by Chris Impey and Holly Henry
- 2012
  - The Visioneers: How A Group of Elite Scientists Pursued Space Colonies, Nanotechnologies, and a Limitless Future (Princeton University Press) by W. Patrick McCray
  - Destined for Space: Our Story of Exploration (Smithsonian Books and Capstone) by Don Nardo (Children's Category)
  - Spacesuit: A History of Fact and Fiction (Casemate Publishers) by Brett Goodin (Young Adult Category)
- 2011
  - Spacesuit: Fashioning Apollo (The MIT Press) by Nicholas de Monchaux
  - The Scientists Behind Space (Heinemann Raintree, an imprint of Capstone) by Eve Hartman (Children's Category)
  - Man on the Moon: How a Photograph Made Anything Seem Possible (Compass Point, an imprint of Capstone) by Pamela Dell (Young Adults Category)
- 2010
  - John F. Kennedy and the Race to the Moon (Palgrave Macmillan) by John M. Logsdon
  - The Red Rockets' Glare: Spaceflight and the Soviet Imagination, 1857-1957 (Cambridge University Press) by Asif A. Siddiqi
  - Eight Great Planets! (Picture Window Books) by Laura Purdie Salas (Children’s Category)
  - This is Rocket Science: True Stories of the Risk-taking Scientists who Figure Out Ways to Explore Beyond Earth (National Geographic Children's Books) by Gloria Skurzynski (Young Adult Category)
- 2009
  - Ambassadors from Earth: Pioneering Explorations with Unmanned Spacecraft (University of Nebraska Press) by Jay Gallentine
  - If I Were an Astronaut (Picture Window Books) by Eric Braun (Children’s Category)
  - Whatever Happened to the World of Tomorrow? (Abrams ComicArts) by Brian Fies (Young Adult Category)
- 2008 – Digital Apollo: Human and Machines in Spaceflight - David A. Mindell
- 2007 – Von Braun: Dreamer of Space, Engineer of War - Michael J. Neufeld
- 2006 - Into the Black: JPL and the American Space Program, 1976-2004 - Peter W. Westwick
- 2006 - Honorable Mention - Testing the Limits - Aviation Medicine and the Origins of Manned Space Flight - Maura Mackowski
- 2005 - First Man: The Life of Neil A. Armstrong - James R. Hansen
- 2004 - Right Stuff, Wrong Sex: America’s First Women in Space Program - Margaret Weitekamp
- 2003 - Leaving Earth: Space Stations, Rival Superpowers, and the Quest for Interpanetary Travel - Robert F. Zimmerman
- 2002 - The Secret of Apollo: Systems Management in American and European Space Programs - Stephen B. Johnson
- 2001 - Moon Lander: How We Developed the Apollo Lunar Module - Thomas J. Kelly
- 2000 - Challenge to Apollo: The Soviet Union and the Space Race, 1945- 1974 - Asif Azam Siddiqi
- 1999 - America's Space Sentinels: DSP Satellites and National Security - Jeffrey T. Richelson
- 1998 - This New Ocean: The Story of the First Space Age - William E. Burrows
- 1997 - Space and the American Imagination - Howard E. McCurdy
- 1996 - Blind Watchers of the Sky: The People and Ideas that Shaped Our View of the Universe - Edward W. "Rocky" Kolb
- 1995 - Spaceflight Revolution: NASA Langley Research Center from Sputnik to Apollo - James R. Hansen
- 1994 - International Cooperation in Space: The Example of the European Space Agency - Roger M. Bonnet and Vittorio Manno
- 1993 - The Sputnik Challenge: Eisenhower's Response to the Soviet Satellite - Robert A. Divine
- 1992 - Blueprint for Space: From Science Fiction to Science Fact - Frederick I. Ordway III and Randy Liebermann
- 1991 - Exploring the Sun: Solar Science Since Galileo - Karl Hufbauer
- 1990 - The Home Planet - Kevin W. Kelley
- 1989 - Journey Into Space: The First Thirty Years of Space Exploration - Bruce C. Murray
- 1988 - No award given
- 1987 - Before Lift Off - Henry S. F. Cooper Jr.
- 1986 - Pioneering the Space Frontier: Report of the National Commission on Space - National Commission on Space
- 1985 - Beachheads in Space - Jerry Grey
- 1984 - 2010: Space Odyssey Two - Arthur C. Clarke
- 1983 - Global Talk - Joseph N. Pelton

== See also ==
- American Astronautical Society
- List of history awards
- List of space technology awards
