= The Wind Gods =

- Film poster
- Directed by: Fritz Mitchell
- Produced by: David Ellison
- Narrated by: Jeremy Irons
- Music by: Pinar Toprak
- Production company: Skydance Productions
- Release date: 2011
- Country: United States
- Language: English

The Wind Gods: 33rd America's Cup is a 2011 documentary sailing yacht racing sports film about the 2010 America's Cup (the 33rd Cup) revised in 2013. The film is narrated by Jeremy Irons, directed by Fritz Mitchell, and produced by Skydance Productions. The soundtrack composed by Pinar Toprak won the 2011 IFMCA Best Documentary Score award. The film aired nationally on PBS (the U.S. Public Broadcasting Service) in 2013.

== Film ==
The film The Wind Gods: 33rd America's Cup was produced by David Ellison, son of Larry Ellison, and his production company, Skydance Productions. Larry Ellison is the syndicate CEO of Oracle Team USA, the winning team in the 33rd America's Cup (AC33), and chairman and founder of Oracle Corporation, the title sponsor of the winning syndicate. David Ellison collaborated with Julian Guthrie on the film. Guthrie wrote the nonfiction book The Billionaire and the Mechanic about the history of Oracle Team USA. The DVD and advertising campaign were produced by Bean Labs, in conjunction with Mt. Philo Films.

=== Synopsis ===
The film profiles Larry Ellison, Russell Coutts, and Ernesto Bertarelli. Coutts is the skipper for Oracle Team USA who was hired away from Bertarelli's Switzerland's Team Alinghi. Bertarelli is the head of the defending champion, the Swiss syndicate Team Alinghi, running the yacht Alinghi 5, while Oracle runs the yacht USA-17. The film proceeds to cover the proceedings of the America's Cup regatta, a championship composed of multiple rounds of racing.

== Soundtrack ==
The Wind Gods

Soundtrack album by Pinar Toprak
- Studio: Caldera Records
- Genre: Film score

A soundtrack album was released, The Wind Gods: Original Motion Picture Soundtrack, composed by Pinar Toprak, released by Caldera Records, ID# C6012, containing 19 tracks, 18 music and one commentary. The film score received the International Film Music Critics Association Award for Best Documentary Score in 2011.

=== Track listing ===
Track	Title	Length	Notes
01	The Wind Gods	2:50	
02	First Race 1851	5:52	
03	Ellison vs. Bertarelli	1:06	
04	The Best Man To Steer The Boat	2:04	
05	Childhood	1:52	
06	We Are The American Team	1:02	
07	There Is No Second Place	1:39	
08	Jimmy And His Father	1:04	
09	The Final Race	3:30	
10	It Was Personal	2:07	
11	The America's Cup is America's Again	2:17	
12	What's At Stake	1:05	
13	The Trophy	1:33	
14	Dreams Are To Pursue	1:15	
15	One Australia	1:26	
16	The 12 Minute Cue	12:18	
17	A Noble Defeat	1:26	
18	Dreams Are To Pursue II	2:40	
19	Audio Commentary by Pinar Toprak	2:54	Bonus Track

== Workography ==
- DVD: Skydance (2013), The Wind Gods: 33rd America's Cup, AC Trimaran LLC; ASIN B00EPBQGYE; UPC 7-92382-32249-7;
- CD: Caldera (2011), The Wind Gods: Original Motion Picture Soundtrack, First Floor Entertainment GmbH, Caldera C6012; ASIN B018A29AQE; UPC 4-260352-760120;

== Awards and honors ==
- Winner — 2011 International Film Music Critics Association (IFMCA) Award for Best Documentary Score

== See also ==
- The Billionaire and the Mechanic (2013 book), by Julian Guthrie, documenting the rise of Larry Ellison's challenge for the America's Cup
- Wind (film), fictionalized account of Dennis Conner's loss and then win of the America's Cup
