= Charles A. Lindbergh Chair in Aerospace History =

Fellowship hosted by the U.S. National Air and Space Museum

The Charles A. Lindbergh Chair in Aerospace History, also known as the Lindbergh Chair, is a one-year senior fellowship hosted by the U.S. National Air and Space Museum (NASM), to assist a scholar in the research and composition of a book about aerospace history. Named for the famous aviator Charles Lindbergh, the position is competitive: one experienced scholar is selected each year from multiple applicants worldwide. Up to $100,000 is granted to the winner.

The Lindbergh Chair is one of four research fellowships administered by NASM within the Smithsonian Institution: the others are the Daniel and Florence Guggenheim Fellowship, the A. Verville Fellowship, and the Postdoctoral Earth and Planetary Sciences Fellowship. Announced in 1977 at the 50th anniversary of Lindbergh's famous solo flight, 1978 was the first year that the Lindbergh Chair was occupied—British aviation historian Charles Harvard Gibbs-Smith was selected as the first recipient.

Each Lindbergh Chair application is judged relative to the suitability of its proposal, the scholarly record of the applicant, the availability of relevant museum staff advisors knowledgeable on the proposed topic, whether the NASM can provide the specific resources, and the applicability of the proposal to NASM's work-in-progress series. The winner is expected to reside in the Washington, D.C., area for nine months to a year, the academic year generally starting in September and ending by the following August. He or she is also expected to take part in discussions with museum staff and to attend professional seminars and colloquia. Along with access to primary research materials, the winner is given the use of an office, a phone and a computer.

== Past winners ==
Year	Awardee	Topic	Published result
1978	Charles Harvard Gibbs-Smith	Wright brothers	
1979	Benjamin S. Kelsey	U.S. aviation in World War II	The Dragon's Teeth?: The Creation of United States Air Power for World War II. Smithsonian Institution Press, 1982
1980			
1981	R. E. G. "Ron" Davies	Airlines	Airlines of the USA since 1914
1982			
1983			
1984	Hans von Ohain		
1985			
1986	John D. Anderson	History of aerodynamics	
1987			
1988	John W. Fozard	History of the lift jet	
1989			
1990			
1991			
1992	Roger E. Bilstein		
1993	W. David Lewis		
1994			
1995			
1996	William M. Leary		
1997	Williamson Murray		
1998	Howard E. McCurdy	American space program	Space and the American Imagination, Smithsonian Institution Press, 1998
1999	William F. Trimble	US Navy aviation of the 1950s	
2000	Bettyann Holtzmann Kevles	Women in space	Almost Heaven: The Story of Women in Space New York: Basic Books, 2003 (Second edition: MIT Press, 2006)
2001	Roger Launius	Jet engines	
2002	Fred R. Erisman	Aviation technology in American boys' series books, 1905 - 1950	a) Boys' Books, Boys' Dreams, and the Mystique of Flight. Fort Worth: TCU Press, 2006. b) From Birdwomen to Skygirls: American Girls' Aviation Stories. Fort Worth: TCU Press, 2009.
2003	Philip Scranton		
2004	John Krige	Space policy	American hegemony and the postwar reconstruction of science in Europe. MIT Press, 2006
2005	James Rodger Fleming		
2006	Robert W. Smith		
2007	Robert W. Farquhar	Space exploration	
2008	John M. Logsdon	Space policy and history	
2009			
2010	Roy MacLeod		
2011	Hugh R. Slotten		
2012	Steven J. Dick		
2013	Asif Siddiqi		
2015	W. Patrick McCray	Collaboration of artists, engineers, & scientists through Apollo era	
2017	Kathryn D. Sullivan	The development of satellite servicing -- design features, tools, procedures, training, tests, and evaluation.	Handprints on Hubble: An Astronaut's Story of Invention. MIT Press, 2019
2019	Alexander C.T. Geppert	Planetizing Earth: Outer Space and the Making of a Global Age, 1972–1990	
2021	Mick Broderick	Cultural and media representation of U.S. ballistic missiles 1957-1966	
2022	Hugh R. Slotten		
