= The Billionaire and the Mechanic =

Non-fiction book

- First edition (2013)
- Author: Julian Guthrie
- Language: English
- Subject: Sailing; Sports
- Genre: Non-fiction
- Publisher: Grove
- Publication place: USA

The Billionaire and the Mechanic is a non-fiction book by Julian Guthrie about Oracle Team USA's quest to win the America's Cup, the oldest trophy in sport. The billionaire in question is Larry Ellison, founder and chairman of Oracle Corporation, and the car mechanic in question is Norbert Bajurin, the Commodore of the Golden Gate Yacht Club.

== Synopsis ==
The book covers the quest of Larry Ellison to win the America's Cup yachting trophy, his establishment of Oracle Team USA under the banner of the Golden Gate Yacht Club, and his various Cup campaigns, at the 2003, 2007 and 2010 Cups. And at the 2013 Cup in the second edition. The book opens with Ellison's experiences at the catastrophic 1998 Sydney to Hobart yacht race, where a freak storm with hurricane-force winds sunk several yachts, killing several sailors. Ellison vowed to transition from open water racing to inshore racing, and in that, go after the oldest trophy in international sport, the America's Cup. Basing out of San Francisco, it covers his troubles with the high brow St. Francis Yacht Club, leading to a search for an alternate sponsoring squadron. In conjunction with this search, the election of a new commodore at the Golden Gate Yacht Club, a club with middle class blue collar membership, lead to Norbert Bajurin, a car radiator shop owner and mechanic, winning. Bajurin discovered the financial difficulties of the Golden Gate Yacht Club, and sought Ellison to be their sponsoring yacht club in a Cup campaign, solving the pending insolvency of his beloved squadron. Then, covering the partnership between the billionaire and the mechanic, and the establishment of Oracle Team USA at the Golden Gate Yacht Club. The book then follows the unsuccessful cup campaigns at the 2003 and 2007 America's Cups, which resulted in their failure to become the US entry into the Cup. Then their rogue challenge, under the Deed of Gift, in the 2010 Cup, becoming the challenger against the Cup defender, and winning the Cup. In the expanded second edition, it follows on the successful Cup defense in the 2013 Cup, and their comeback from the brink of losing the Cup in 2013.

== Publication ==
The first edition, "The Billionaire and the Mechanic: How Larry Ellison and a Car Mechanic Teamed Up to Win Sailing's Greatest Race, the America's Cup", was published in 2013. The book appeared in the Northern California bestsellers list. The work was optioned for a movie deal. An updated edition, "The Billionaire and the Mechanic: How Larry Ellison and a Car Mechanic Teamed Up to Win Sailing's Greatest Race, the America's Cup, Twice", was published in 2014 to cover the successful defense of the America's Cup in 2013. The book appeared on the New York Times best sellers list.

Guthrie collaborated with David Ellison, son of Larry Ellison, and head of Skydance Productions, on the 2011-2013 film The Wind Gods, a documentary on the 33rd America's Cup of 2010, where Oracle Team USA won the Cup. The film share details with the book The Billionaire and the Mechanic.

== Reception ==
Angus Phillip's review in The Wall Street Journal said of the book that "She (the author) clearly had exceptional access to the generally media-shy billionaire and provides detailed descriptions of Mr. Ellison's living spaces, work habits, tennis pals like Rafael Nadal and Jimmy Connors, best friend and neighbor Steve Jobs, his many airplanes, cars, boats and houses, his clothing tastes, even his food preferences. She paints a picture of a modern contrarian who delights in bucking convention, which is how he wound up at Golden Gate."

== Bibliography ==
- Julian Guthrie (2013). The Billionaire and the Mechanic: How Larry Ellison and a Car Mechanic Teamed Up to Win Sailing's Greatest Race, the America's Cup (1st ed.). Grove Press. ISBN 978-0-8021-2135-6. OCLC 842283801.
- Julian Guthrie (2014). The Billionaire and the Mechanic: How Larry Ellison and a Car Mechanic Teamed Up to Win Sailing's Greatest Race, the America's Cup, Twice (2nd ed.). Grove Press. ISBN 978-0802121363. OCLC 875288929.

== Awards and honors ==
- Bay Area News Group - Non-Fiction - Best Sellers - June 2013 — (announced July 2013)
- New York Times - Sports Literature - Best Sellers - July 2014 — (announced July 2014)

== See also ==
- Wind (film) fictionalized account about how Dennis Conner lost and then won the America's Cup
- The Wind Gods (film) 2013 documentary about the 33rd America's Cup 2010
- How to Make a Spaceship (book) by Julian Guthrie, about the Ansari X Prize
