= Learning to Fly (Christina Aguilera song) =

Single by Christina Aguilera

from the album Paw Patrol: The Mighty Movie
- Released: September 22, 2023
- Genre: Pop
- Length: 2:56
- Label: RCA
- Songwriters: Christina Aguilera; Jeremy Silver
- Producers: Christina Aguilera; Jeremy Silver; Pinar Toprak

Christina Aguilera singles chronology
"No Es Que Te Extrañe" (2022)	"Learning to Fly" (2023)	"My Favorite Things" (2025)

Lyric video
- "Learning to Fly" on YouTube

"Learning to Fly" is a song by American singer Christina Aguilera from the soundtrack of the animated film Paw Patrol: The Mighty Movie (2023). Written by Aguilera and Jeremy Silver, and produced by Silver, Aguilera, and Pinar Toprak, the song was released on September 22, 2023, as the third standalone single from the soundtrack.

The song received positive reviews. It was praised for its emotional message, Aguilera's vocals and its piano arrangement. Music and film critics considered it a classic "tearjerker".

== Background and release ==
At the end of August 2023, Paramount Pictures and Spin Master Entertainment revealed that the soundtrack of the animated film Paw Patrol: The Mighty Movie would feature a song by Aguilera. Cal Brunker, director of PAW Patrol: The Mighty Movie, noted that "When approaching the subject of [the soundtrack], we always start with the artist, looking at it from the perspective of an emotional story. Take Christina Aguilera's song for example: there's a really intense moment about Skye's story in the film, and Aguilera gives a heartwarming display of her vocal skills."

The song was released on September 22, 2023 although promotion was halted due to the 2023 SAG–AFTRA strike.

== Composition ==
The song was written by Jeremy Silver and Christina Aguilera. The strings were arranged by Pinar Toprak, with whom Aguilera previously collaborated on her 2019 residency, The Xperience.

== Critical reception ==
The recording was positively assessed by music critics. A review in Variety called "Learning to Fly" a "tear-jerking ballad" that fits well with "breathtaking, cinematic animation". The editor of That Grape Juice stated that with the ballad, Aguilera "sings an anthem of hope, inspiration and uplift". Dom Fisher, writing for Geek Vibes Nation, appreciated the emotional message of the recording, stating that "it has much more impact than in theory it should". The Toya'z World website hailed "Learning to Fly" as a power ballad whose performer "proves that she can still sing and sound beautiful." The review also praised the song for its "restrained, composed vocals" and "soaring" piano melody. Kyle McGrath, a journalist for Lilithia, praised PAW Patrol 2 for its "great soundtrack", including Aguilera's song. Writing for the LGBTQ-related website Queer.pl, Albert Nowicki noted that: "It's a song about how — in order to fly and fulfill our dreams — we must learn how to take our first fall. Without it, success is difficult to achieve. It is a song that honors the from-zero-to-hero trope, used in popular culture."

== Music video ==
On September 22, 2023, a promotional lyric video appeared online. It premiered on Nick Jr. on YouTube. The clip shows scenes from the animated film Paw Patrol: The Mighty Movie.

== Personnel ==
Credits adapted from the liner notes of Apple Music.

- Christina Aguilera – vocals, songwriting, production
- Jeremy Silver – songwriting, production
- Pinar Toprak – production
- Manny Marroquin – mixing
- Zach Pereyra – mastering, assistant engineering
- Anthony J Vilchis – assistant engineering
- Trey Station – assistant engineering
- Ray Charles Brown Jr. – recording

== Release history ==
Region	Date	Format(s)	Label(s)	Ref.
Various	September 22, 2023	Digital download; streaming	RCA	
Germany	September 22, 2023	Digital download; streaming	RCA	
Italy	September 22, 2023	Digital download; streaming	RCA	
France	September 22, 2023	Digital download; streaming	RCA	
