= Julian Guthrie =

AI startup founder, journalist, and author

- Occupations: CEO and Founder, Alphy
- Notable work: The Billionaire and the Mechanic; How to Make a Spaceship; Alpha Girls

Julian Guthrie is an American former journalist and nonfiction author based in San Francisco, USA. In 2020, Julian founded a tech startup called Alphy to use AI to improve human communication.

== Career ==
Guthrie started her journalism career at the San Francisco Examiner, and after its merger, continued at the San Francisco Chronicle. She published her first book, The Grace of Everyday Saints, in 2011, about a church's closure order. It was based on work she had done as metro reporter covering the church's drama in 2005. In 2013, she published her second book, The Billionaire and the Mechanic, which was updated to include the Oracle Team second win at the America's Cup in its 2014 second edition. Its second edition landed on the New York Times bestsellers list. In 2014, her third book was preemptively sold to Penguin Books. That book was originally entitled "Beyond: Peter Diamandis and the Adventure of Space", before becoming How to Make a Spaceship. In 2016, her third book, How to Make a Spaceship, was published. This book enticed several offers to acquire the film rights. It landed on the New York Times bestsellers list, and became a finalist in the 2017 PEN/Wilson Literary Science Writing Award, and won the 2016 Emme Astronautical Literature Award. Her fourth book, Alpha Girls, bought up by Currency Books in 2017 for 2019 publication, incited a bidding war in 2017 for its film and TV rights, ending up at Welle Entertainment.

== Publications ==
The Grace of Everyday Saints
Covers the battle of a Roman Catholic congregation to keep their neighborhood church open despite the command by the Church hierarchy to close 'St. Brigid's Church' down.
The Billionaire and the Mechanic
Covers the origins of Team Oracle USA, with founder Larry Ellison, and its quest to win the America's Cup, and through its second edition, the second win of the America's Cup. Angus Phillip's review in The Wall Street Journal said of the book that "She (the author) clearly had exceptional access to the generally media-shy billionaire and provides detailed descriptions of Mr. Ellison's living spaces, work habits, tennis pals like Rafael Nadal and Jimmy Connors, best friend and neighbor Steve Jobs, his many airplanes, cars, boats and houses, his clothing tastes, even his food preferences. She paints a picture of a modern contrarian who delights in bucking convention, which is how he wound up at Golden Gate."
How to Make a Spaceship
Covers the origin of the X Prize, its funding woes, the teams that entered the competition, major figures related to the contest, the winning team with SpaceShipOne, and the follow-up of Virgin Galactic scooping up the winning tech. Gregg Easterbrook's review in The Wall Street Journal said of the book that "'How to Make a Spaceship' offers a rousing anthem to the urge to explore."
Alpha Girls
Covers the unsung women heroes of Silicon Valley and the computer industry.

== Bibliography ==
- Julian Guthrie (2011). The Grace of Everyday Saints: How a Band of Believers Lost Their Church and Found Their Faith. Houghton Mifflin Harcourt. ISBN 978-0547133041.
- Julian Guthrie. The Billionaire and the Mechanic. Grove Press.
  - Julian Guthrie (2013). The Billionaire and the Mechanic: How Larry Ellison and a Car Mechanic Teamed Up to Win Sailing's Greatest Race, the America's Cup (1st ed.). Grove Press. ISBN 978-0-8021-2135-6.
  - Julian Guthrie (2014). The Billionaire and the Mechanic: How Larry Ellison and a Car Mechanic Teamed Up to Win Sailing's Greatest Race, the America's Cup, Twice (2nd ed.). Grove Press. ISBN 978-0802121363.
- Julian Guthrie (2016). How to Make a Spaceship: A Band of Renegades, an Epic Race, and the Birth of Private Spaceflight. Penguin Books. ISBN 978-1594206726.
- Julian Guthrie (2019). Alpha Girls. Currency Books.
- Guthrie, Julian (September 8, 2020). Good blood : a doctor, a donor, and the incredible breakthrough that saved millions of babies. New York: Abrams. ISBN 978-1-4197-4331-3. OCLC 1140780842.

== Awards and honors ==
- New York Times – Sports Literature – Best Sellers – July 2014 – for 2014 book "The Billionaire and the Mechanic" (announced July 2014)
- New York Times – Science Literature – Best Sellers – November 2016 – for 2016 book "How to Make a Spaceship" (announced November 2016)
- Finalist — 2017 PEN/E. O. Wilson Literary Science Writing Award — for 2016 book "How to Make a Spaceship" (announced January 2017)
- Winner — 2016 Eugene M. Emme Astronautical Literature Award — for 2016 book "How to Make a Spaceship" (announced September 2017)

== See also ==
- Ashlee Vance, another journalist who also covered a computing billionaire, and also the NewSpace sector.
