= William W. Crouch =

United States Army general (1941–2024)

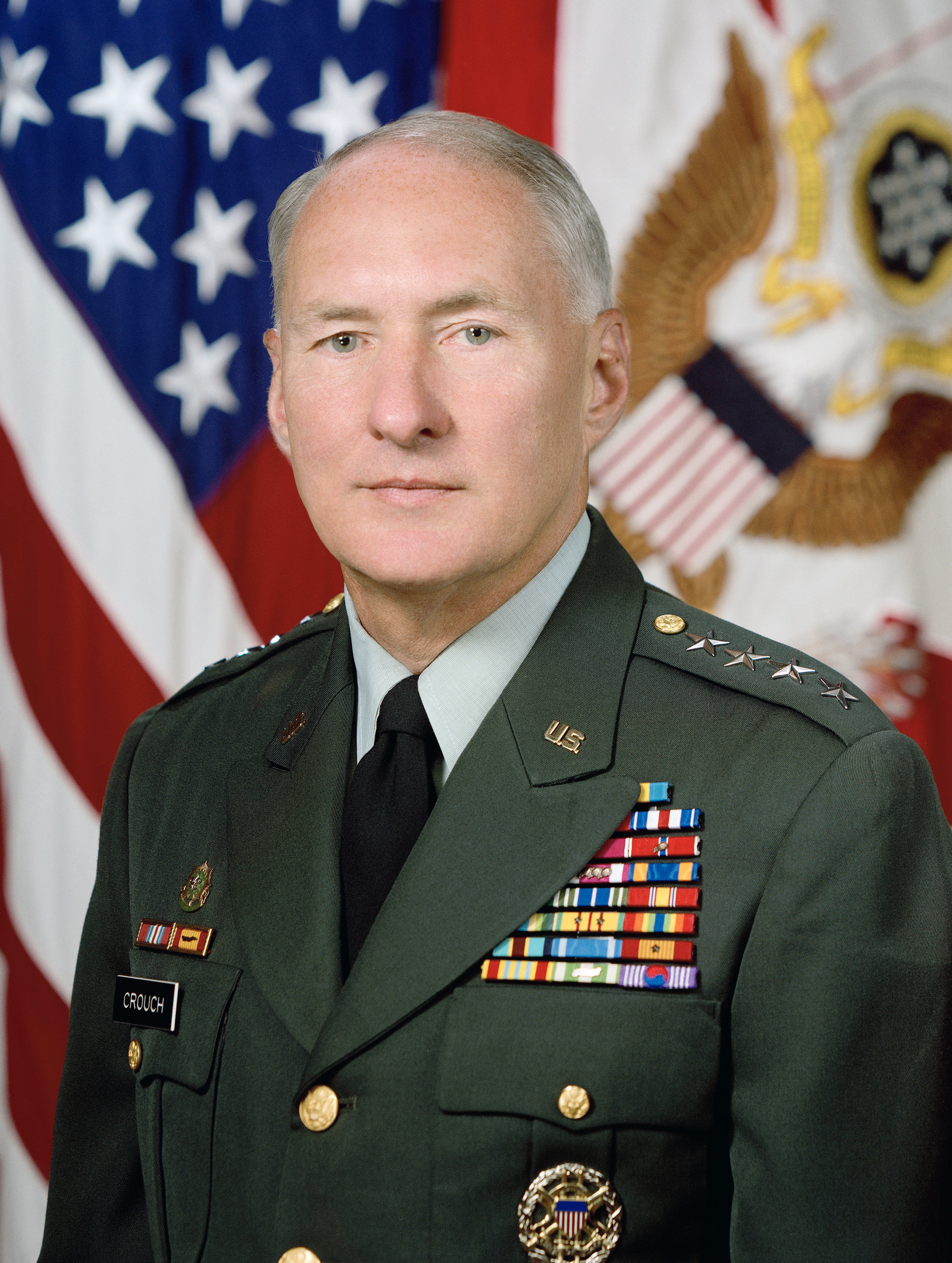
- Official portrait, 1997
- Born: 12 July 1941; Los Angeles, California, U.S.
- Died: 20 September 2024 (aged 83); Denver, Colorado, U.S.
- Military career
- Allegiance: United States
- Branch: United States Army
- Service years: 1963–1998
- Rank: General
- Nickname: Bill
- Commands: Vice Chief of Staff of the United States Army; Allied Land Forces Central Europe; United States Army Europe; Eighth United States Army; 5th Infantry Division; 2nd Armored Cavalry Regiment
- Conflicts: Vietnam War
- Awards: Defense Distinguished Service Medal; Army Distinguished Service Medal; Silver Star; Legion of Merit; Bronze Star Medal (2)
- Other work: Cole Commission co-chair

General William Wright Crouch (12 July 1941 – 20 September 2024) was a United States Army four-star general who served as Vice Chief of Staff of the United States Army from 1997 to 1998.

== Early life ==
Crouch was born on 12 July 1941, in Los Angeles, California. He attended the San Diego Army and Navy Academy and graduated from Claremont Men's College with a degree in Civil Government. He also received a master's degree in history from Texas Christian University.

== Military career ==
Crouch commanded soldiers at every level from platoon through to army. He began his service in 1963 as a cavalry platoon leader in the 5th Infantry Division. He went on to command four companies, two of which were cavalry troops in combat. His subsequent commands included a cavalry squadron, the 2nd Armored Cavalry Regiment and the 5th Infantry Division. He also served as Commanding General of the Eighth United States Army and Chief of Staff United Nations Command/Combined Forces Command and United States Forces Korea.

Crouch assumed command of United States Army Europe on 19 December 1994, and assumed command of Allied Land Forces Central Europe (LANDCENT) on February 15, 1996, and was its first American since its establishment in 1993. He served as Vice Chief of staff from 1997 until his retirement in 1998.

Crouch was a graduate of the United States Army Command and General Staff College and the United States Army War College. His decorations include the Defense Distinguished Service Medal, the Army Distinguished Service Medal, the Silver Star, the Legion of Merit, and the Bronze Star Medal with oak leaf cluster.

== Post-military career ==
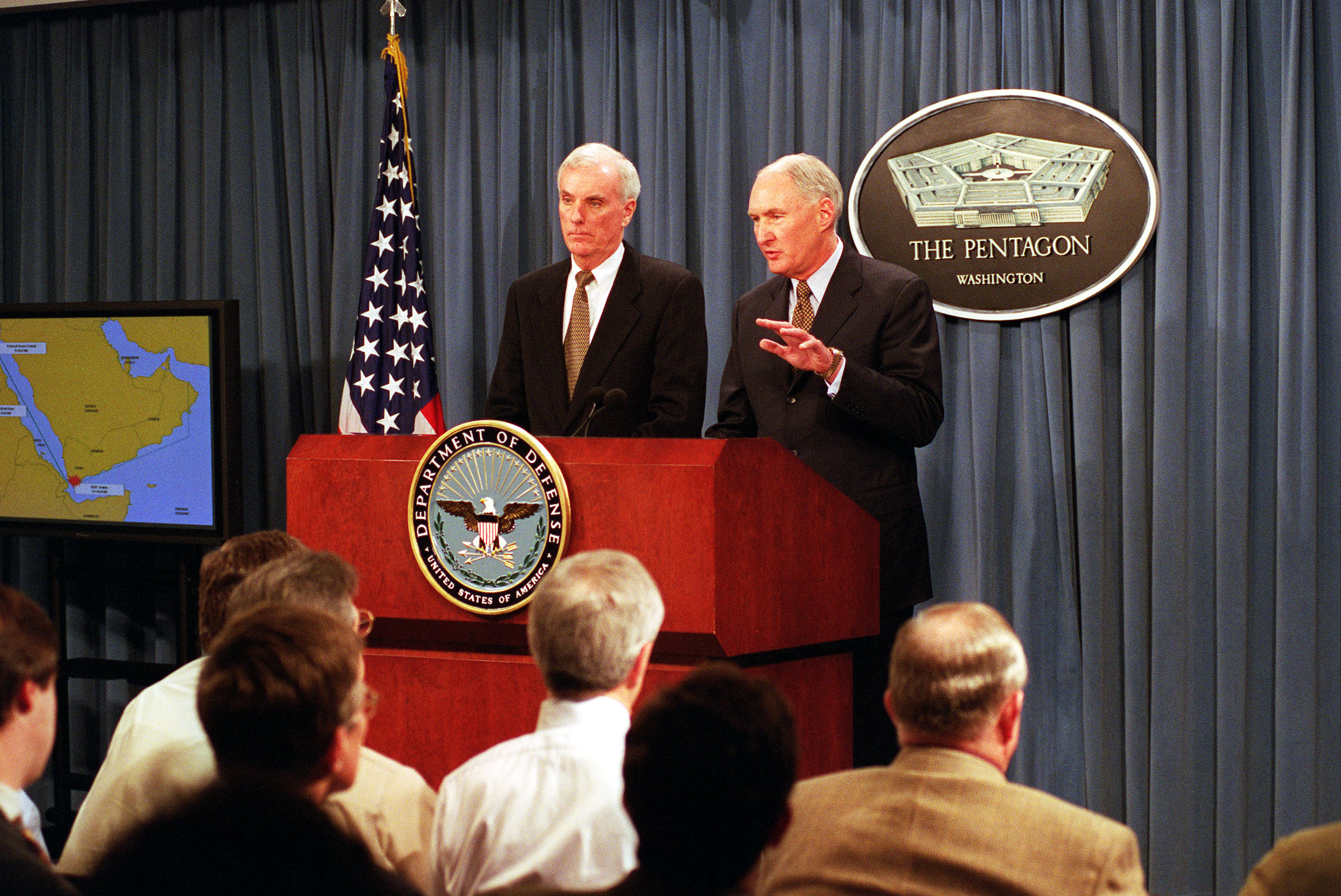
Admiral Harold W. Gehman (left) and General William W. Crouch brief reporters on the report of the USS Cole Commission

Crouch, along with retired Admiral Harold W. Gehman, Jr., were appointed by Defense Secretary William S. Cohen on 19 October 2000, as co-chairmen of the Department of Defense's Cole Commission to investigate the bombing of the USS Cole (DDG-67). He also served on the board of directors of the Community Anti-Drug Coalitions of America, and beginning in May 2005 served on the board of Directors of FLIR Systems. He was also a Senior Mentor with the Leadership Development and Education Program for Sustained Peace at the United States Naval Postgraduate School, served on the board of the Keck Institute for International and Strategic Studies at Claremont McKenna College, and sat on the advisory board of Isilon Systems.

== Personal life and death ==
Crouch's wife, Vicki, also a native of Southern California, attended Scripps College, as did their two daughters, Cami and Cathi. They had two grandchildren, Chris and Elizabeth, and resided in Colorado. William W. Crouch died in Denver on 20 September 2024, at the age of 83.

== Awards and decorations ==
Defense Distinguished Service Medal
Army Distinguished Service Medal
Silver Star
Legion of Merit
Bronze Star Medal with Oak Leaf Cluster
Meritorious Service Medal with three Oak Leaf Clusters
Air Medal
Army Commendation Medal
Army Achievement Medal
Valorous Unit Award
National Defense Service Medal with Service star
Vietnam Service Medal with two Service stars
Armed Forces Service Medal
Army Service Ribbon
Army Overseas Service Ribbon
NATO Medal for Former Yugoslavia
Order of National Security Merit (Korea) Gugseon Medal
Gallantry Cross (Vietnam) with bronze star
Vietnam Armed Forces Honor Medal 1st class
Vietnam Gallantry Cross Unit Citation
Vietnam Civil Actions Medal Unit Citation
Vietnam Campaign Medal

Military offices
Preceded by David M. Maddox	Commanding General of U.S. Army Europe; 1994–1997	Succeeded by Eric K. Shinseki
Preceded by Ronald H. Griffith	Vice Chief of Staff of the United States Army; 1997–1998	Succeeded by Eric Shinseki
