= Us Again (film) =

2021 American animated short film

- Official poster
- Directed by: Zach Parrish
- Written by: Zach Parrish
- Produced by: Brad Simonsen
- Cinematography: Chris McKane; Amol Sathe
- Edited by: Jesse Averna
- Music by: Pinar Toprak
- Production company: Walt Disney Animation Studios
- Distributed by: Walt Disney Studios Motion Pictures (Note: Distributed by Walt Disney Studios Motion Pictures through the Walt Disney Pictures banner.)
- Release date: March 5, 2021 (with Raya and the Last Dragon)
- Running time: 6–7 minutes
- Country: United States
- Language: English

Us Again is a 2021 American animated dance short film directed and written by Zach Parrish and distributed by Walt Disney Studios Motion Pictures. It follows Art, a grumpy old man, and Dot, his energetic wife, in a vibrant city of dance. The two enjoy themselves in a rainstorm that makes them young until it disappears and reverts them back to old age. Parrish conceived Us Again after noticing that he was growing older and took inspiration from his grandparents.

Its score, composed by Pinar Toprak, was written before storyboarding and animation, unlike the typical filmmaking process. For dance reference, Disney hired choreographers Keone and Mari Madrid. Us Again was released on March 5, 2021, preceding theatrical showings of Raya and the Last Dragon. The short has received positive reviews from critics.

== Plot ==
As the people of a vibrant city dance to the beat of the music, the elderly Art stays in his apartment and grumpily watches TV. His wife, Dot, enters, and tries to have him get out and enjoy the day. He refuses, leaving her heartbroken. Art soon regrets this decision and looks upon a photo of himself and Dot when they were young and full of life. He steps out on his fire escape when it suddenly begins to rain. The rain makes him younger and rejuvenates him, prompting him to set out to look for Dot.

Art encounters Dot, who has also become young through the rain. The two begin to dance vibrantly through the streets. When the rain clouds begin to move, they revert to old age. Art begins dragging Dot through the city in an attempt to remain young. They flee to Paradise Pier, and as Art continues to chase the rain clouds, Dot willingly falls behind. Eventually, the clouds leave completely and the two revert to their old age.

As he walks back, Art sees Dot sitting by herself and joins her. The two look into each other's eyes and wordlessly acknowledge their love for one another. Art and Dot proceed to dance together, though not as vibrantly as before, as the rain puddle beneath them reflects their younger selves.

== Production ==
=== Development ===
In February 2021, it was announced that theatrical showings of Raya and the Last Dragon would be accompanied by Us Again, the first original theatrical short film produced by Disney since Inner Workings in 2016.

Zach Parrish, who previously helmed the short film Puddles (2020), which is part of the Short Circuit series, and Big Hero 6's animation, wrote and directed Us Again. He conceived the film after he noticed he was beginning to grow older and yearned for a younger body. Parrish said: "It made me realize that if I spent all my time focused on what I thought I was missing, then I was going to miss the beauty in the present". He was also influenced by his grandparents' differing attitudes to aging. One set traveled far distances in a recreational vehicle, while the other "watched life". Arthur and Dorothy, his paternal grandparents, inspired the names Art and Dot. Art represents one of Parrish's sedentary grandparents.

Producer Brad Simonsen was interested in working on the film due to Parrish's point of view. In Big Hero 6, he observed something that intrigued him in working with Parrish. Simonsen believed Parrish had a remarkable eye for animation and an uncanny ability to envisage a tale. The film was written without dialogue, with the story told through pantomime, dance, and music instead. This idea was inspired by the Fantasia franchise, which also lacks dialogue. La La Land also provided influence, mostly due to the collection of musical references to research. The short's city is inspired by Chicago, New York City, and Los Angeles. The piers and boardwalks are influenced by those in Santa Monica and Seattle.

The production team hoped to depict as many underrepresented groups as possible. Art—who is Japanese American—and Dot—who is African American—were purposely made to be an underrepresented interracial couple. Art's nationality was inspired by Parrish's wife, who is also Japanese American. In addition, Parrish wanted to depict older people, who are often underrepresented. It was vital to the production team to have individuals that symbolized the characters they had in the film. According to Parrish, it was a significant commitment for them and the studio as a whole. Disney's Diversity & Inclusion Team worked with them throughout the process to ensure that a character was acting as authentically as possible.

Parrish, a longtime dance enthusiast, intended to mix the concepts of a fountain of youth, an old couple, and a dance universe. As he was working on these ideas, he remembered seeing the viral video of Keone and Mari Madrid, both choreographers, dancing as an elderly couple in 2016. He asked them to meet in April 2019, and the Madrids eagerly accepted the invitation to work on the project. The two were incorporated into his idea and, eventually, his pitch for the film. Parrish and the Madrids were compelled to discover the film's emotional core after seeing a video of an elderly couple dancing to the 1978 Bob Marley and the Wailers song "Is This Love". Parrish described it as visceral and ideal for the film.

=== Music ===
Pinar Toprak composed the soundtrack for the short, which drew inspiration from the 1960s's funk and soul music. In contrast to the usual filmmaking process, the score needed to be written before storyboarding and animation to give the choreographers something work with, since the Madrids "[a]re very specific with the music and the sound and the emotion for the time stamps". The recording of the soundtrack during the COVID-19 pandemic necessitated social distancing. They needed to figure out how to record with 40 strings and a large band. The strings were recorded first before leaving. The brass musicians arrived next, and they had to be separated. Toprak was insistent on recording everything precisely the way it was supposed to be captured, and she was not willing to sacrifice on anything.

=== Animation and design ===
For the lead characters, Parrish desired something that was close to yet different from Disney designs. He also wanted something that was slightly smaller and simpler in form. Art and Dot's ultimate design was a combination of several ideas that sought to capture their personalities and nationalities.

The production team was able to repurpose elements from previous projects. For things such as buildings in the background or vehicles, the film borrowed some aspects from Big Hero 6 and other short films. However, most of the animation in the film was original. Disney's tools mainly allowed the crew to easily adapt a rig to a fresh model and then improve it. John Kahwaty, the head of characters, designed and managed a large number of characters, including the two major ones who switch between numerous models.

According to Parrish, approximately half of the dancing is based on the Madrids'. He stated that they had a rapid and staccato style of motion that reminded him of animation. The Madrids used various dance styles, which ranged from "big, athletic, gravity-bending to small, communicative, and gestural to couple-y romantic". In the storyboards, they attempted to communicate the film's emotional moments.

The Madrids recorded their choreography based on Parrish's own recordings of himself talking about each scene. They aimed to make the characters' motions look like a discussion and represent the film's themes. Disney created an animatic using a video reference of the Madrid's choreography, which served as the foundation for the animation. The crowd team filled the city with background dancers and vehicles. During this, the animation was keyframed and the rain was created in Houdini.

Art and Dot's opposing viewpoints are communicated through their facial expressions, body language, and dancing. Disney juxtaposed the dreary aesthetic of Art and Dot's small apartment with the colorful look of the New York dance world outside. The animators enhanced the neon lights—which Parrish aimed to use as much as possible—with a 1960s atmosphere when it became dark and began raining. As Art and Dot drew closer to the end of the pier and away from the carnival, the crew withdrew the colors. They utilized the Ferris Wheel's shifting light for the moment when Art realizes his love for Dot, and began to add additional saturation.

== Release ==
Us Again was theatrically released on March 5, 2021, preceding Raya and the Last Dragon. The film began streaming on Disney+ on June 4, 2021. Us Again was included on Raya's Digital HD and Blu-ray release. "An Introduction to Us Again", a behind-the-scenes look of the short by Parrish, was included on the Blu-ray.

== Reception ==
=== Critical response ===
Us Again has received positive reviews. Pramit Chatterjee of Mashable gave the short a five out of five rating, praising its direction, choreography and animation. He further stated that "everything is mind-blowingly perfect ... [I]t'll make you wish it was a full-length feature film". Umesh Punwani of Koimoi gave the short film four stars out of five and commended the music, which he compared to "Another Day of Sun" from La La Land, animation, and lack of dialogue. Samantha Labat of CinemaBlend found the film stunning and said "the animation is so beautiful and real that you forget you're not looking into actual human faces".

=== Accolades ===
Us Again won the HCA Award for Best Short Film and NAACP Image Award for Best Short-Form (Animated). It was shortlisted for the Academy Award for Best Animated Short Film. Variety predicted it would make the final nominee list, though this was ultimately not the case.
