= G. Scott Hubbard =

Aeronautics and astronautics researcher (born 1948)

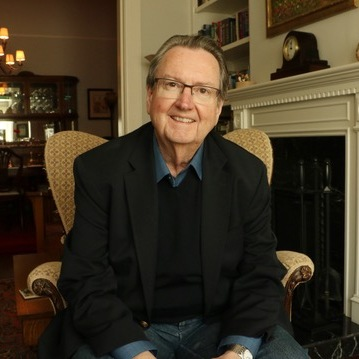
- Hubbard in 2020
- Born: December 27, 1948 (age 77); Lexington, Kentucky U.S.
- Other name: Scott Hubbard
- Education: Vanderbilt University; University of California, Berkeley
- Known for: Restructuring NASA's Mars Program, known as the first "Mars Czar"
- Awards: AIAA Honorary Fellow (2019); Vanderbilt Student Media Hall of Fame (2018); Henry Clay Distinguished Kentuckian Award (2016); NASA Exceptional Public Service Medal (2016); Aviation Museum of Kentucky Hall of Fame (2013); NASA Exceptional Service Medal (2005); Distinguished Service Medal (2004); AIAA von Kármán Lecture in Astronautics Award (2004); AIAA, Elected Fellow (2003); NASA Outstanding Leadership Medal (1998)(1999)(2002); NASA Exceptional Achievement Medal (1994); NASA Group Achievement Award (1990)(1995)(1996)(2001)
- Scientific career
- Fields: Aeronautics and Astronautics
- Workplaces: Lawrence Berkeley National Laboratory, NASA, Stanford University
- Website: gscotthubbard.com

G. Scott Hubbard (born December 27, 1948) is a physicist who has been engaged in space-related research as well as program, project and executive management for more than 45 years including 20 years with NASA, culminating as director of NASA's Ames Research Center. As of 2012, Hubbard chairs SpaceX Safety Advisory Panel, he previously served as the NASA representative on the Columbia Accident Investigation Board, was NASA's first Mars program director and restructured the Mars program in the wake of mission failures.

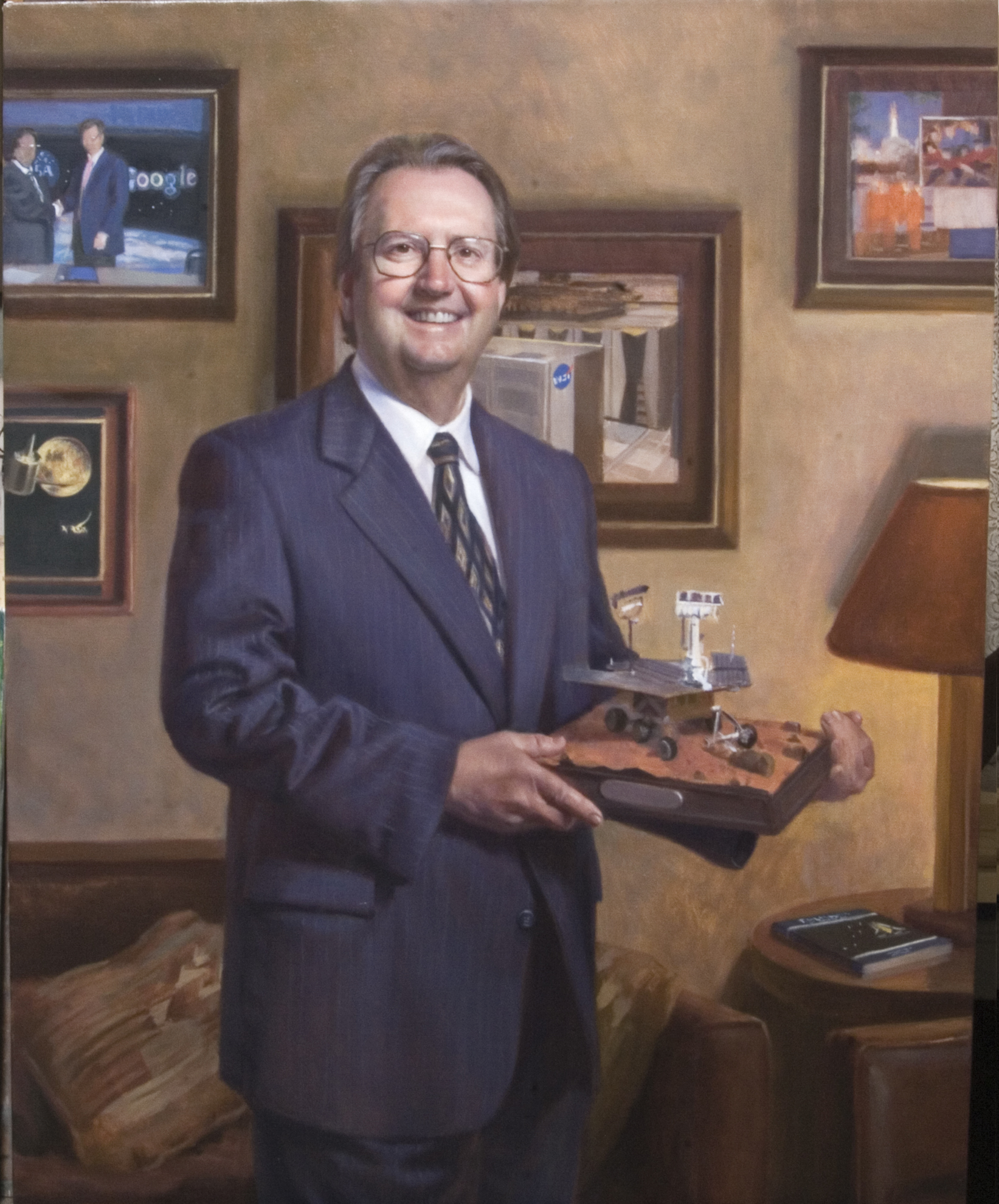
Hubbard official Ames Research Center (2008)

== Personal life ==
Hubbard was born December 27, 1948, in Lexington, Kentucky. His father, Robert Nicholas Hubbard (1920 -1997), was an attorney and later served as a State Court Judge. Hubbard's mother, Nancy Clay Hubbard (née Brown; 1922–2011), was a homemaker and served as executive director of the Elizabethtown, Kentucky Visitor Commission. Hubbard has one younger sister, Nancy Kelly Huber and half-sister Nicole Hubbard by his father's second marriage. Hubbard is currently married to Pat Power, a retired Federal Human Resources Manager. (Hubbard's first Marriage to Susan A. Ruggeri-Hubbard ended with Susan's death in 2014.)

Hubbard is known personally and professionally by his middle name, Scott, because of the long-time connection to a family friend, Nannie F. Scott.

== Early life ==
Hubbard spent the majority of his childhood in Elizabethtown, Kentucky about 85 miles (137 km) west of Lexington. Hubbard's fascination with space exploration began at around nine years old, when Sputnik first orbited the Earth. His dad then brought home a 2-inch (51 mm) refracting telescope for the backyard which the two used to study the night skies, with a particular interest in Mars. Hubbard was an avid reader of both science fiction and science books by people such as George Gamow, Isaac Asimov, and Fred Hoyle, as well as books on astronomy and cosmology. Hubbard's interest in life in the universe eventually turned into—many years later—astrobiology.

A few years after the telescope came home, Hubbard's father brought home a baritone ukulele which enthralled him. He learned from the included pamphlet a few basic chords and some simple tunes which he practiced for hours on end. From there he graduated to “Truetone” Spanish guitar but, proving far too frustrating to play, moved to a “Silvertone” quickly. He taught himself to play from books and by listening to the likes of the greats of the early 1960s, such as Woody Guthrie, Pete Seeger, the Kingston Trio, Bob Dylan, and Peter, Paul and Mary. From this period in his life onward, space and music began a close race for his attention.

== Academic background ==
Hubbard graduated in 1966 from Elizabethtown High School as valedictorian of his class and as a National Merit finalist, which together brought a considerable number of scholarship offers. He chose to accept the Founder's Scholarship from Vanderbilt University in Nashville, Tennessee, where he double majored in physics and astronomy.

From 1975 to 1977, Hubbard completed his graduate studies in solid-state physics and semiconductor physics at the University of California, Berkeley. In 2006, he received the prestigious Doctor of Science (Sc.D) degree from the Technical University of Madrid. The degree was awarded honoris causa after a thorough review of Hubbard's professional accomplishments and a vote by the Academic Council.

== Career ==
Prior to joining NASA, Hubbard was a staff scientist at the Lawrence Berkeley National Laboratory, was a founder, VP, and general manager for Canberra Semiconductor (a high-tech start up in the San Francisco Bay Area), and held the position of senior research physicist at SRI International.

At NASA, Hubbard served as the first Mars Exploration Program Director (aka the "Mars Czar") where he restructured the Mars program in the wake of mission failures. Hubbard founded the NASA Astrobiology Institute, conceived the Mars Pathfinder mission with its airbag landing, was the manager for NASA's Lunar Prospector Mission, served as the NASA representative on the Columbia Accident Investigation Board, and, ultimately, served as the Center Director of NASA's Ames Research Center from 2002 to 2006. During his tenure, two significant public-private relationships defined Hubbard’s legacy.

In October 2004, in an effort to reestablish Ames’ role as NASA’s principal center for supercomputing, NASA unveiled the “Columbia,” one of the world’s most powerful supercomputing systems of the time. Named to honor the crew of the Space Shuttle Columbia lost February 1, 2003, Columbia was built and installed at the NASA Advanced Supercomputing facility at Ames, in partnership with Silicon Graphics, Inc. and Intel, in less than 120 days. Utilization of the Columbia provided scientists and researchers an improved global circulation model, allowing for hurricane prediction 3 days earlier than ever before and presumably saving lives and property.

Hubbard’s second major effort brought together Ames Research Center and Google to conduct cutting-edge research and development. The September 2005 memorandum of understanding between the two entities outlined plans for cooperation in areas such as large-scale data management, bio-info-nano convergence, and encouragement of the entrepreneurial space industry. “Google and NASA share a common desire –to bring a universe of information to people around the world,” said Eric Schmidt, then Google’s CEO. “Imagine having a wide selection of images from the Apollo space mission at your fingertips whenever you want it. That’s just one small example of how this collaboration could help broaden technology’s role in making the world a better place.”

Hubbard is the recipient of multiple NASA honors, including NASA's highest award, the Distinguished Service Medal.

In 2014, Hubbard also held the office of Sentinel Program Architect at the B612 Foundation, dedicated to protecting the Earth from asteroid strikes and led mainly by scientists, former astronauts and engineers from the Institute for Advanced Study, the Southwest Research Institute, NASA and the space industry.

Following his service at NASA, he moved to Stanford University in the department of Aeronautics and Astronautics, where he created Stanford's Center of Excellence for Commercial Space Transportation and served as founding editor of the peer-reviewed journal New Space.

As of 2012, Hubbard chairs the SpaceX Safety Advisory Panel, additionally composed of astronauts Leroy Chiao, Mark Kelly, and Ed Lu, with former NASA flight surgeon and chief of medicine at NASA's Johnson Space Center Dr. Richard Jennings.

== Publications ==
Hubbard is the author of the book Exploring Mars, Chronicles From a Decade of Discovery (2012) with a foreword by Bill Nye. Neil deGrasse Tyson wrote "It's high time somebody revealed the underbelly of why and how we travel to the Red Planet. Leave it to NASA’s ‘Mars Czar’ Scott Hubbard to tell this story. Yes, we're all explorers, but every mission to space is enabled by financial, political, and cultural forces that you never hear about—without which there'd be no enterprise of discovery at all."

== Music ==
Hubbard started playing guitar at a young age with his family. He played throughout his undergraduate years at Vanderbilt in the Nashville Blues Group, including a performance for Allen Ginsberg who was on campus for the 1967 Vanderbilt “Impact Symposium”.

Between graduation and moving to California in 1973, Hubbard was a full-time musician in Nashville, playing with the band Pale Fire at various bars and restaurants, including the Exit/In. Ultimately, with a passion for music but not the music business, he decided rocket science would be a more effective way to make his contribution to the world professionally.

Hubbard never stopped playing guitar for fun, though, and continues today to play with friends and colleagues, even bridging his worlds of science and music.
