= Roger D. Launius =

American air and space historian and author

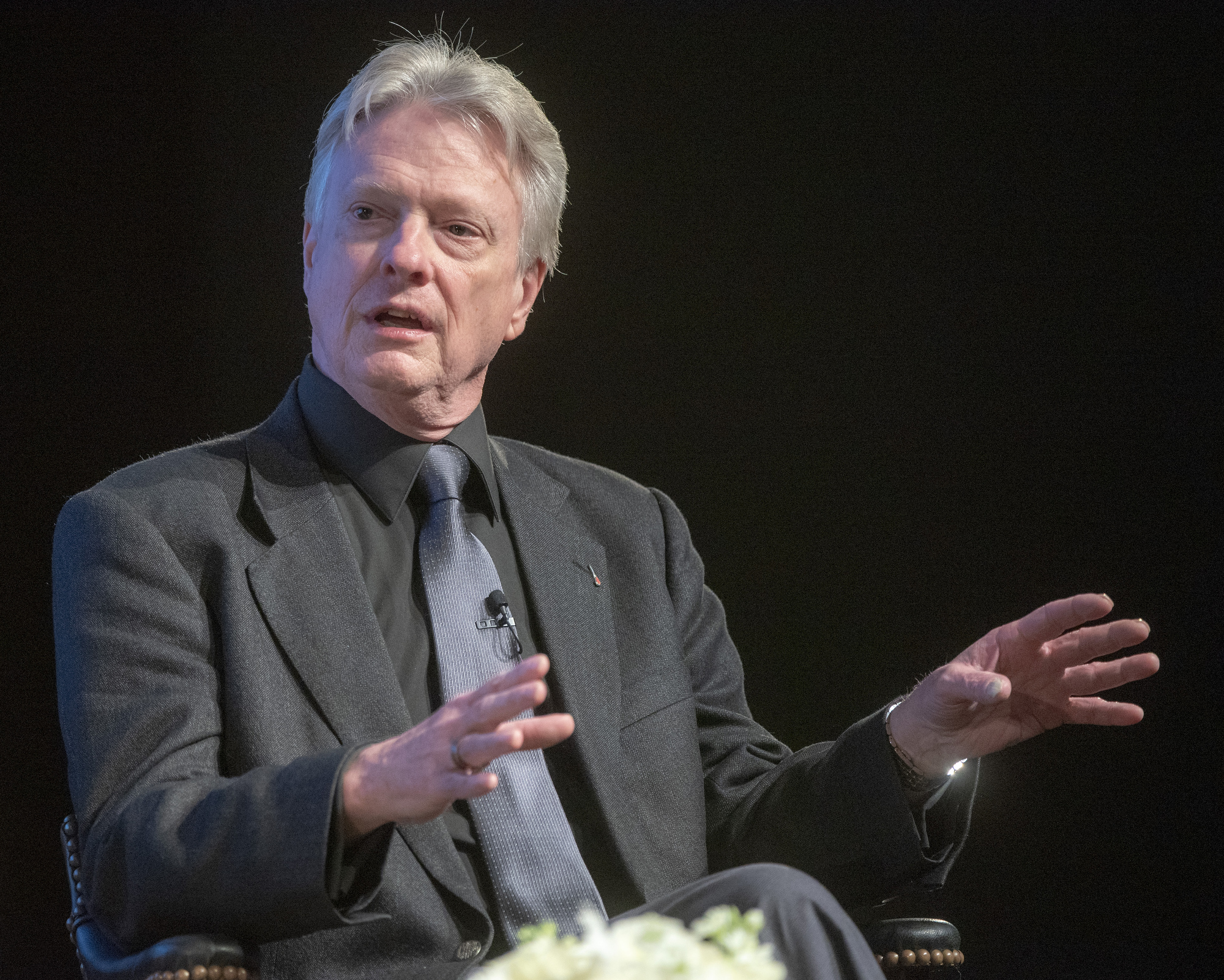
- Born: May 15, 1954 (age 72); Galesburg, Illinois, U.S.
- Education: Graceland College, Louisiana State University
- Occupations: Historian and author
- Employer(s): NASA, National Air and Space Museum
- Website: https://launiusr.wordpress.com/

External videos
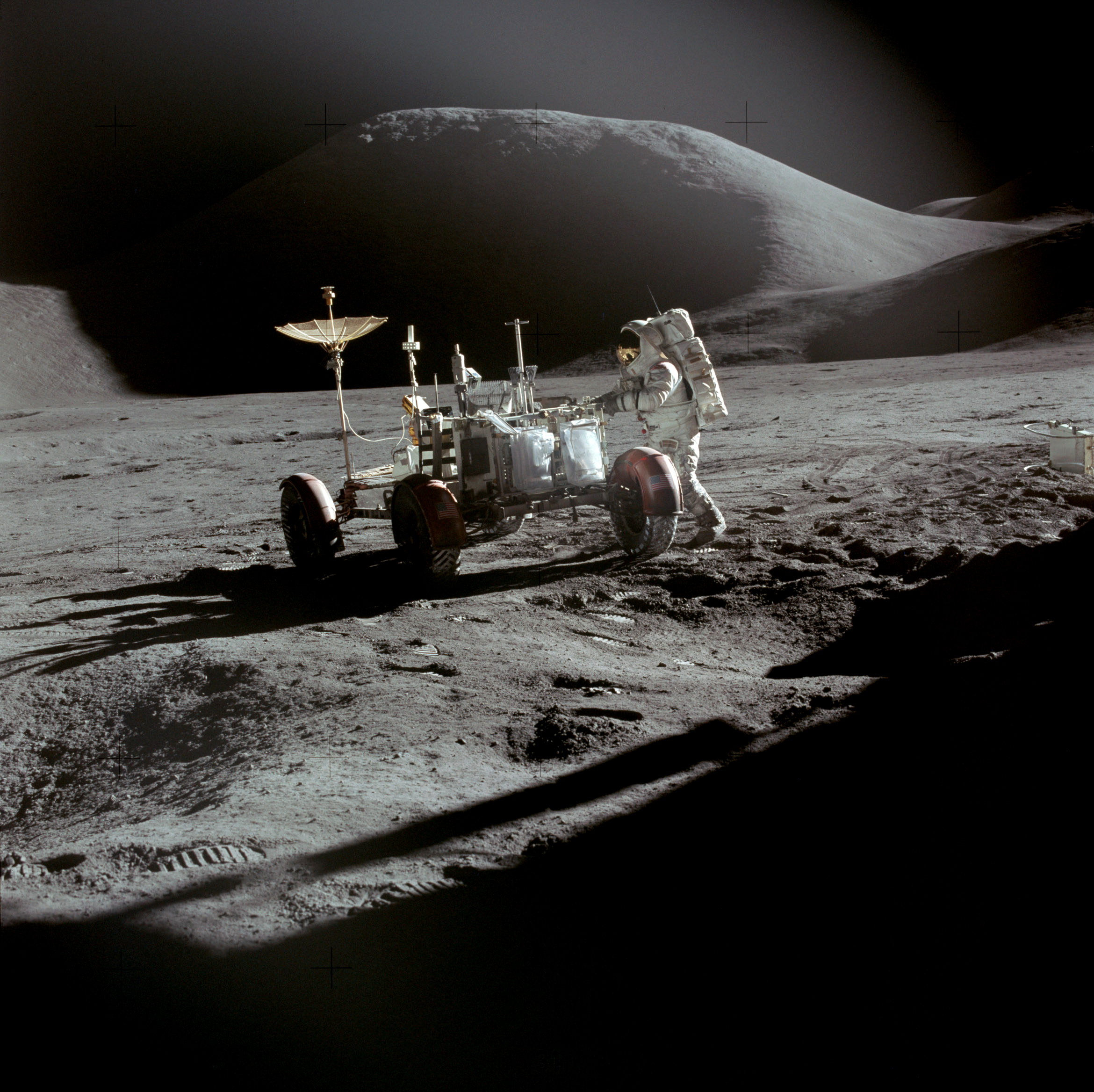
- Roger D. Launius, “How We Remember Apollo”, Philosophical Society of Washington

Roger D. Launius (born May 15, 1954) is an American historian and author of Lithuanian descent, a former chief historian of NASA. He retired in 2016 as Associate Director for Collections and Curatorial Affairs for the Smithsonian National Air and Space Museum in Washington, D.C. Launius is a consulting historian in air and space history. He has written many books on space flight, and also published on the history of the Latter Day Saint movement.

== Early life and education ==
Launius was born in Galesburg, Illinois, and was raised in Greenville, South Carolina. He graduated from Graceland College in 1976 with bachelor of American history and received a master of American history in 1978 and a PhD in history in 1982 both from Louisiana State University.

== Career ==
From 1982 to 1990, Launius held several positions as a civilian historian with the United States Air Force. Between 1990 and 2002, he was the chief historian for NASA. In 2001, he held the Charles A. Lindbergh Chair in Aerospace History at the Smithsonian. From 2002–2006 he was Chair of the Division of Space History at the Smithsonian National Air and Space Museum. From 2006–2013 he was Senior Curator, and from 2013–2016 Launius was Associate Director for Collections and Curatorial Affairs at the same institution.

Launius contributed space policy analysis in the wake of the Columbia Accident Investigation Board 2003 report. He has been a regular commentator on space-related issues for the news media.

He was president of the Mormon History Association in 1993–94 and was president of the John Whitmer Historical Association in 1991–92.

== Publications ==
Coming Home, 2011

Launius has written more than twenty books and 100 articles on the history of aerospace. Some titles include Historical Analogs for the Stimulation of Space Commerce (2014), Space Shuttle Legacy: How We Did it and What We Learned (2013), and Exploring the Solar System: The History and Science of Planetary Probes (2012). He has twice won the AIAA History Manuscript Award, for Coming Home: Reentry and Recovery from Space in 2011, and for Space Stations: Base Camps to the Stars in 2003.

Launius has published on the history of the Latter Day Saint movement. He won both the David Woolley Evans and Beatrice Evans Biography Award (1989) and the John Whitmer Historical Association Best Book Award for his work on Mormon history, Joseph Smith III: Pragmatic Prophet.

Launius studies the history of baseball in the United States, and published Charlie Finley: The Outrageous Story of Baseball's Super Showman with G. Michael Green.

== Awards and honors ==
Launius other awards include:

- John F. Kennedy Astronautics Award, American Astronautical Society, 2009, as an "individual who has made an outstanding contribution to public service through leadership in promoting our space programs for the exploration and utilization of outer space".
- Secretary's Research Prize, Smithsonian Institution, 2009.
- Roger R. Trask Award, Society for History in the Federal Government, 2009.
- Director's Award, National Air and Space Museum, 2008.
- Harmon Memorial Lecturer in Military History, United States Air Force Academy, 2006.
- NASA Distinguished Service Medal, 2001.
- NASA Exceptional Service Medal, 1999.
- Charles Thomson Prize, 1995, 1998, 2008, 2012

Launius is a fellow of the American Association for the Advancement of Science (2007), the American Astronomical Society (2001), and the International Academy of Astronautics (2007). He is also a Fellow of the American Institute for Aeronautics and Astronautics (2021).
