= Stephen A. Turcotte =

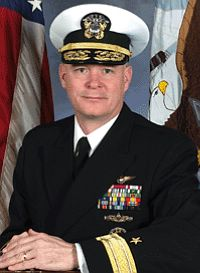
Rear Adm. Stephen A. Turcotte

Stephen Allan Turcotte (born 1953) is a retired Rear Admiral of the United States Navy.

Born in Maryland, Turcotte grew up in Grand Rapids, Michigan. He is a graduate of Marquette University with a Bachelor of Science degree in Political Science in 1975. Turcotte later earned a master's degree in management from Salve Regina University and a second master 's degree in national security and strategic studies from the Naval War College.

== Career ==
Turcotte was commissioned an officer and was designated a Naval Aviator in 1977. He trained with VS-41 before being stationed aboard the USS Kitty Hawk (CV-63) during the Iran hostage crisis. In 1980, he returned to VS-41, this time as a flight instructor and a NATOPS Model Manager. Later, he was assigned to the United States Sixth Fleet and was deployed to the Mediterranean Sea during the Lebanese Civil War. After returning to the United States, Turcotte was stationed as NAS Cecil Field. He was then assigned as a maintenance manager with VS-22 aboard the USS John F. Kennedy (CV-67). After graduating from the Naval War College and Armed Forces Staff College, he was stationed aboard the USS Theodore Roosevelt (CVN-71). In 1994, he was reassigned to the USS Kitty Hawk and in 1996, he was assigned to the Office of the Joint Chiefs of Staff. From 1998 to 2001, he was Commanding Officer of Naval Air Station Jacksonville. In 2002, he became Commander of the Naval Safety Center. He remained in that position until 2003. During that time, he was a member of the Columbia Accident Investigation Board. He assumed command of Navy Region Mid-Atlantic in 2003.

Awards he has received include the Defense Superior Service Medal, the Legion of Merit, the Bronze Star Medal, the Defense Meritorious Service Medal, the Meritorious Service Medal, the Navy and Marine Corps Commendation Medal and the Navy and Marine Corps Achievement Medal.
