= Gerrit Wunder =

Austrian composer (born 1978)

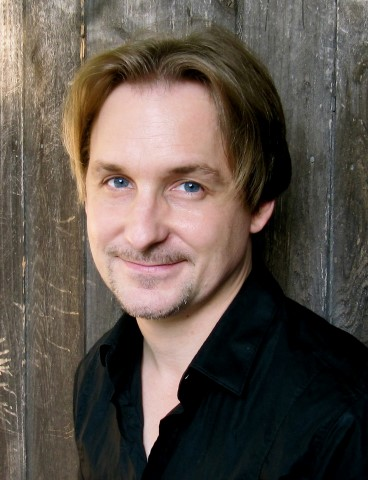
- Born: 1978 (age 47–48)
- Education: University of Music and Performing Arts Vienna
- Occupation: Composer
- Musical career
- Genres: Film score
- Instruments: Piano, keyboards, synthesizer, violin, viola
- Website: gerritwunder.com

Gerrit Wunder is an Austrian film composer and graduate of University of Music and performing arts Vienna living in Los Angeles. The BMI Foundation named him one of the winners of the 21st annual Pete Carpenter Fellowship for aspiring film composers under the age of 35

He co-composed (together with William T. Stromberg) the score for Jurassic WorldVR Expedition and collaborates with Pinar Toprak and Rupert Gregson-Williams, contributing music for DC’s Stargirl and Postman Pat: The Movie. Selection of other productions he was involved in: Marvel 616 (2020-); Dead Men (2018); Shazam (2017); Magic in the Moonlight (2014); Na Nai'a: Legend of the Dolphins (2011); Behind Mansion Walls (2011– ); Inside America (2010) review; Dancing Stars (2005– ). He also scored TV movies for Lifetime, ORF and Nature Documentaries for Red Bull Media. His soundtracks are released at multiple labels, such as Kronos records, Gramola, MovieScore Media, Audio Network Production Music Library.

He won awards at the UTAH FILM FESTIVAL: Best "Short Music Score" for "Creatures of Whitechapel" and "Best Music Score" for "Kiss the Devil in the Dark".
