= Harold W. Gehman Jr. =

United States Navy admiral

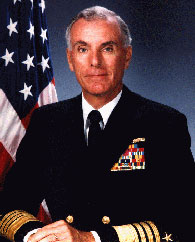
- Admiral Harold W. Gehman
- Born: October 15, 1942 (age 83); Norfolk, Virginia, US
- Military career
- Branch: United States Navy
- Service years: 1965–2000
- Rank: Admiral
- Nickname: Hal
- Commands: United States Joint Forces Command; Cruiser-Destroyer Group 8 USS Belknap; USS Dahlgren; USS Conserver
- Conflicts: Vietnam War
- Awards: Defense Distinguished Service Medal (2); Legion of Merit (4); Bronze Star Medal
- Other work: Chairman, Columbia Accident Investigation Board; Co-chair, Cole Commission; BRAC committee

Harold Webster Gehman Jr. (born October 15, 1942) is a retired United States Navy four-star admiral who served as NATO's Supreme Allied Commander, Atlantic (SACLANT), Commander-in-Chief of the United States Joint Forces Command, one of the United States' Unified Combatant Commands, and Vice Chief of Naval Operations. He was also the Co-Chairman of the Commission that investigated the terrorist attack on the USS Cole and was Chairman of the Columbia Accident Investigation Board (CAIB) after the Space Shuttle Columbia disintegrated during reentry in 2003, killing all seven crew members.

== Military career ==
Gehman was born in Norfolk, Virginia, on October 15, 1942, and graduated from Pennsylvania State University in 1965 with a Bachelor of Science in Industrial Engineering and a commission in the Navy from the Naval Reserve Officer Training Corps.

A Surface Warfare Officer, he served at all levels of leadership and command in guided missile destroyers and cruisers. During the course of his career, Gehman had five sea commands in ranks from Lieutenant to Rear Admiral.

Gehman served in Vietnam as Officer in Charge of a Swift patrol boat and later in Chu Lai as Officer in Charge of a detachment of six swift boats and their crews. He subsequently served as executive officer of USS Mitscher from March 1971 to February 1973.

Gehman attended the Armed Forces Staff College from August 1975 to January 1976. He then commanded USS Conserver from January 1976 to June 1978, USS Dahlgren from December 1980 to September 1983, USS Belknap from February 1988 to June 1989 and Cruiser-Destroyer Group 8 from July 1993 to July 1994.

His staff assignments were both afloat on a Carrier Battle Group staff and ashore on a fleet commander's staff, a Unified Commander's staff and in Washington, D.C., on the staff of the Chief of Naval Operations (four tours).

Promoted to four-star Admiral in 1996, he became the 29th Vice Chief of Naval Operations in September 1996. As Vice Chief of Naval Operations he was a member of the Joint Chiefs of Staff, formulated the Navy's $70 billion budget and developed and implemented policies governing the 375,000 people in the Navy.

Assigned in September 1997 as Supreme Allied Commander, Atlantic and Commander-in-Chief, United States Atlantic Command (later changed to Joint Forces Command), he became one of NATO's two military commanders and assumed command of all forces of all four services in the continental United States and became responsible for the provision of ready forces to the other Unified Commanders in Chief and for the development of new joint doctrine, training and requirements.

He retired from the Navy in October 2000.

== Awards and decorations ==

Badge	Surface Warfare Officer Pin		
1st Row	Defense Distinguished Service Medal with oak leaf cluster		Legion of Merit with three gold award stars
2nd Row	Bronze Star Medal with Combat "V"	Meritorious Service Medal	Joint Service Commendation Medal
3rd row	Navy and Marine Corps Achievement Medal with award star	Combat Action Ribbon	Joint Meritorious Unit Award
4th Row	Navy Meritorious Unit Commendation	Navy "E" Ribbon	National Defense Service Medal with one bronze service star
5th row	Vietnam Service Medal with three service stars	Navy Sea Service Deployment Ribbon with four service stars	Navy and Marine Corps Overseas Service Ribbon
6th row	Vietnam Gallantry Cross Unit Citation	Vietnam Civil Actions Medal Unit Citation	Vietnam Campaign Medal

== Post military ==
In retirement, Gehman has served as chairman of the Columbia Accident Investigation Board, co-chair, with retired general William W. Crouch, of the Department of Defense's Cole Commission, on the Base Realignment and Closure (BRAC) committee, and is a Senior Fellow of the National Defense University's Capstone Program.

== Personal ==
Gehman is married to Janet F. Johnson and they have two children, Katherine and Christopher.
