= Eugene M. Emme =

American historian

Eugene Morlock Emme
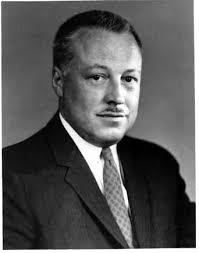
- Born: 3 November 1919; Evanston, Illinois, United States
- Died: 24 June 1985 (aged 65); Silver Spring, Maryland, United States
- Occupation: Historian
- Known for: First NASA historian

Eugene Morlock Emme (3 November 1919 – 24 June 1985) was an American air force pilot during World War II (1939–1945) who became a pioneering historian of aviation, and then the first historian of NASA's aerospace program.

== Life ==
Eugene Emme was born on 3 November 1919 in Evanston, Illinois. He graduated from Morningside College in Sioux City, Iowa in 1941. Before the December 1941 attack on Pearl Harbor he was a CPT pilot. After the United States joined the war he became a naval aviator. He served in the Pacific theater. In 1948 he transferred to the United States Air Force Reserve. In 1949 Emme received his Ph.D. in Modern European History from the University of Iowa. He became a member of the civilian faculty of the Air University (United States Air Force) in 1949. He was a pioneer in oral history, and interviewed Lord Dowding of the British Royal Air Force, Field Marshal Erhard Milch at Landsberg Prison in 1952, and Dwight D. Eisenhower. In 1958 he moved to Battle Creek, Michigan, as project director in the operations research office of the Office of Civil Defense.

Emme became NASA's first historian in 1959. As a pioneer in aerospace history he advocated solid research and documentation. Emme had to address the challenges of obtaining solid support within NASA for historical research while developing scholars who would establish the basis for documenting and interpreting aerospace history, a new discipline that would largely rely on material from NASA programs. In 1962 Emme arranged for the annual Society for the History of Technology (SHOT) meeting to have a special session on the history of rocketry. This led to Technology and Culture devoting its entire Fall 1963 issue to rocketry. The papers were republished in 1964 as The History of Rocket Technology.

In 1965 Emme published A History of Space Flight, aimed at younger readers. The book lays out the timeline of developments in rocket and satellite technology from ancient times, with many photographs. It explains the vehicles' scientific purpose, technology, objectives and performance. However, the book added little information that was not already publicly available, and avoided discussion of controversies such as the decision by President John F. Kennedy to ignore his advisers and send a crewed flight to the Moon.

Emme became co-chair of the history committee of the International Academy of Astronautics, and in this role attended congresses in Paris, Warsaw, Madrid, Constance, Vienna and Moscow. He was a member of the Reserve Officers Association, Air Force Historical Foundation, Air Force Association and Society for the History of Technology. Emme retired from the Ready Reserve as a colonel in 1972. He retired from NASA in 1978.

Emme was a member of the Marvin Methodist Church of Silver Spring, Maryland near Washington, D.C. He died of cancer on 24 June 1985 at the Holy Cross Hospital in Silver Spring, and was buried in Arlington National Cemetery. He was survived by his wife and three children.

== Legacy ==
Emme was influential in encouraging SHOT historians to work in the areas of aeronautical and space technology, and in ensuring that NASA's historians undertook solid research and documentation of the history of that institution. He established the history committees of the American Institute of Aeronautics and Astronautics, the American Astronautical Society, the International Academy of Astronautics and the National Rocket Club (now the National Space Club). It was through his efforts that the National Space Club set up its Goddard Historical Essay Award.

The Eugene M. Emme Astronautical Literature Awards are named in Emme's honor. They recognize outstanding English-language books that advance public understanding of astronautics.

== Selected publications ==
- Eugene M. Emme (1 May 1955), "Some Fallacies Concerning Air Power", The Annals of the American Academy of Political and Social Science (Research Article), 299 (1): 12–24, doi:10.1177/000271625529900103, S2CID 143446164
- Eugene M. Emme (1965), James V. Bernardo (ed.), A History of Space Flight, New York: Holt, Rinehart and Winston, p. 224
- Eugene M. Emme (1961), Aeronautics and Astronautics: An American Chronology of Science and Technology in the Exploration of Space, 1915-1960
- Eugene M. Emme, ed. (1964), The History of Rocket Technology: Essays on Research, Development, and Utility
- Eugene M. Emme, ed. (1959–1961), The Impact of Air Power: National Security and World Politics
- Eugene M. Emme, ed. (1977), Two hundred years of flight in America : a Bicentennial survey (A supplement to Advances in the astronautical sciences. Proceedings of a symposium held at the National Air and Space Museum Nov. 4, 1976.), San Diego, Calif.: Univelt, p. 310, ISBN 087703091X
- Emme, Eugene M., ed. (1982), Science fiction and space futures – past and present, AAS History Series, vol. 5, San Diego: Univelt, ISBN 0-87703-172-X

Emme wrote many other books for NASA and the History Series of the American Astronautical Society.

== Sources ==
- "Eugene M. Emme — 1919-1985: Veteran Space Historian", Aerospace Historian, 32 (4), Air Force Historical Foundation: 272, December 1985, JSTOR 44524121
- Eugene M. Emme Astronautical Literature Awards, American Astronautical Society
- Fries, Sylvia D. (July 1986), "Eugene M. Emme (1919-1985)", Technology and Culture, 27 (3), The Johns Hopkins University Press and the Society for the History of Technology: 665–667, doi:10.1353/tech.1986.a889608, JSTOR 3105425
- Kevles, Daniel J. (October 1966), "A History of Space Flight", The American Historical Review (review), 72 (1), doi:10.1086/ahr/72.1.135
