= Pinar Toprak =

Turkish-American composer (b. 1980)

- Toprak in 2026
- Born: 18 October 1980 (age 46); Istanbul, Turkey
- Education: Istanbul University State Conservatory; Berklee College of Music
- Musical career
- Genres: Film and television scores; jazz; rock; electronic; new-age
- Occupation: Composer
- Instruments: Piano; keyboards; synthesizer; guitar; violin
- Years active: 2000–present
- Website: pinartoprak.com

Pinar Toprak (Turkish: Pınar Toprak; born 18 October 1980) is a Turkish-American composer, conductor, and musician, who specializes in creating thematic film and television scores. She is a two-time Grammy Award and a Primetime Emmy Award nominee.

== Early life and education ==
Toprak was born and grew up in Istanbul, Turkey. Her father was an accountant, who supported Toprak's interest in music and movies, particularly westerns and Superman. Toprak has said she was always drawn to superheroes and comic books growing up. She memorized the dialogue from the 1978 film starring Christopher Reeve, and dubbed it to Turkish.

Toprak enrolled in the Istanbul State Conservatory, the oldest conservatory in Turkey. During her studies there, she focused on composition and multi-instrumentalism. She began as a violinist and later switched to guitar.

She finished high school at 16, and after her 17th birthday she moved to the United States. She lived with her brother in Wisconsin where she completed a short ESL program before enrolling at Berklee. During that time she found work as a jazz guitarist and pianist."

She received her Bachelor of Music in Film Scoring from Berklee in 2000 when she was 19 years old. Following her move to Los Angeles, she received a Master's in Classical Composition from the California State University, Northridge in 2002. It was at CSUN where she was recommended for an internship at Paramount Pictures at the age of 20.

== Career ==
At Paramount she attended scoring sessions and worked for Hans Zimmer's production company, Media Ventures International (now Remote Control). She also trained in programming sample instruments. She left Zimmer's company after a year to work as assistant to composer William Ross.

In 2006 she composed the score for the video game Ninety-Nine Nights, and then for Behind Enemy Lines 2. From that time onward, she worked on more than forty feature films and several video game and television projects. She wrote the fanfare for Skydance Media from 2010 to 2022.

Her score for the romantic comedy The Lightkeepers (2009) won the 2010 International Film Music Critics Association (IFMCA) Award for Best Comedy Score and made it to the 2011 Academy Award Shortlist for Best Original Score. She composed the score for the documentary The Wind Gods (2011), for which she received a second IFMCA award for Best Documentary Score in 2011. In 2017 she was hired by director Dean Devlin to compose the score for Geostorm but left after production companies Warner Bros. and Skydance Media hired a new director for the film's reshoots; she was later replaced by Lorne Balfe. The same year, composer Danny Elfman hired Toprak to write additional music for the 2017 DC film Justice League (Dir. Zack Snyder).

Toprak auditioned and pitched a main theme for the Marvel Studios film Captain Marvel, making her the first woman to ever score a major superhero film, and the first to compose for a film that made more than $1 billion.

In 2019 she received a nomination for the World Soundtrack Awards.

Toprak's other prominent works include the films The Lost City, Slumberland, Paw Patrol: The Mighty Movie and Lonely Planet, and the television series Krypton, Stargirl, McMillions (for which she was nominated for a Primetime Emmy Award for Original Music Composition for a Documentary Series or Special) and Tomb Raider: The Legend of Lara Croft. She is the first Turkish composer to be nominated for an Emmy. Her work on the 2018 film The Tides of Fate earned her the 2019 ASCAP Shirley Walker Award, and also, her third IFMCA Award for Best Original Score for a Documentary Film in 2019.

In 2022, Amazon hired Toprak to compose and conduct a new theme for its Thursday Night Football telecasts, marking the first time a female composer wrote an original theme for the National Football League. Toprak recorded it at the Ocean Way studio in Nashville with an 70-piece orchestra. The new theme was met with wide praise.

Toprak was nominated twice for a Grammy Award for Best Score Soundtrack for Video Games and Other Interactive Media for scoring the video game Avatar: Frontiers of Pandora (2023).

Toprak scored the orchestral parts of Luminous The Symphony of Us, a fireworks-based nighttime spectacular at EPCOT at Walt Disney World Resort that debuted in 2023.

== Personal life ==
In 2008 Toprak married Thanos Kazakos, a music composer and sound design major from Greece. They had met at Berklee, and had a son and a daughter. They divorced in 2013. She currently resides in Los Angeles.

== Discography ==
Key
†	Denotes titles that have not yet been released

=== Film ===
Year	Title	Director	Notes
2004	Hold The Rice	Alfonso Pineda Ulloa	Short film
2004	Headbreaker	Alfonso Pineda Ulloa	Short film
2005	When All Else Fails	David Ellison	Short film
2006	Behind Enemy Lines II: Axis of Evil	James Dodson	
2007	Daydreamer	Brahman Turner	
2007	Sinner	Marc Benardout	
2007	Fall Down Dead	Jon Keeyes	
2007	In the Name of the Son	Harun Mehmedinović	Short film
2007	Say It in Russian	Jeff Celentano	
2008	Ocean of Pearls	Sarab Singh Neelam	with Karsh Kale and Snatam Kaur
2008	Light of Olympia	San Wei Chan	
2009	The Crimson Mask	Elias Plagianos	
2009	Breaking Point	Jeff Celentano	
2009	The Lightkeepers	Daniel Adams	
2011	Last Will	Brent Huff	
2011	The River Murders	Rich Cowan	
2011	Girls! Girls! Girls!	Shana Betz; Beth Grant; Tracie Laymon; Jennifer Lynch; Barbara Stepansky; America Young	with Heather Schmidt
2012	Vamperifica	Bruce Ornstein	
2012	How to Have a Happy Marriage	Jennifer Lynch	
2012	Restos	Alfonso Pineda Ulloa	Short film
2015	The Challenger	Kent Moran	
2015	The Curse of Downers Grove	Derick Martini	
2017	The Chainbreakers	Rui Yang	with Emir Işılay
2017	The Monster Project	Victor Mathieu	with Emir Işılay
2017	Justice League	Zack Snyder	Additional music
2018	The Angel	Ariel Vromen	
2019	Purl	Kristen Lester	Short film
2019	Captain Marvel	Anna Boden; Ryan Fleck	
2019	Skyfire	Simon West	
2020	It's Time	Frank Waldeck	
2021	Us Again	Zach Parrish	Short film
2022	The Lost City	Aaron Nee; Adam Nee	
2022	Slumberland	Francis Lawrence	
2023	Shotgun Wedding	Jason Moore	
2023	Paw Patrol: The Mighty Movie	Cal Brunker	Replaced Heitor Pereira
2023	Family Switch	McG	
2024	Lonely Planet	Susannah Grant	
2026	Paw Patrol: The Dino Movie	Cal Brunker	
2026	Bad Day	Jake Szymanski	

=== Television ===
Year	Title	Notes
2008	Loch Ness Terror	Television film
2008	Ogre	Television film
2008	Ba'al	Television film
2009	Wyvern	Television film
2010	Mongolian Death Worm	Television film
2010	Medium Raw: Night of the Wolf	Television film
2015	Clan of the Cave Bear	Television film
2016	Falling Water	4 episodes
2018–19	Krypton	20 episodes
2020–22	Stargirl	39 episodes
2020	McMillions	6 episodes
2024	Our Living World	4 episodes
2024–25	Tomb Raider: The Legend of Lara Croft	with Gerrit Wunder; 16 episodes
2025	Bad Thoughts	6 episodes
2026	Africa: Earth's Wild Home	7 episodes

=== Documentary works ===
Year	Title	Director	Notes
2008	Pregnant in America	Steve Buonaugurio	
2013	The Wind Gods	Fritz Mitchell	
2015	In Utero	Kathleen Man Gyllenhaal	
2018	The Tides of Fate	Fritz Mitchell	

=== Video games ===
Year	Title	Notes
2006	Ninety-Nine Nights	with Takayuki Nakamura
2017	Fortnite	Additional music
2023	Avatar: Frontiers of Pandora	

== Other work ==
- Christina Aguilera: The Xperience Las Vegas Residency (2019) (residency intro)
- Skydance Media fanfare (2010–22)
- "Learning to Fly", single by Christina Aguilera (2023; producer)
- Prime Video Sports theme (2022–present)
- Luminous The Symphony of Us, music from the EPCOT nighttime spectacular at Walt Disney World Resort (2023)

== Awards and nominations ==
Award	Year	Category	Work	Result	Ref.
ASCAP Award	2019	Shirley Walker Award	The Tides of Fate	Won	
International Film Music Critics Association Awards	2010	Best Original Score for a Comedy Film	The Lightkeepers	Won	
International Film Music Critics Association Awards	2011	Best Original Score for a Documentary Film	The Wind Gods	Won	
International Film Music Critics Association Awards	2019	Best Original Score for a Documentary Film	The Tides of Fate	Won	
Grammy Awards	2025	Best Score Soundtrack for Video Games and Other Interactive Media	Avatar: Frontiers of Pandora	Nominated	
Grammy Awards	2026	Best Score Soundtrack for Video Games and Other Interactive Media	Avatar: Frontiers of Pandora	Nominated	
Primetime Emmy Awards	2020	Outstanding Music Composition for a Documentary Series or Special	McMillions ("Episode 1")	Nominated	
World Soundtrack Awards	2019	Public Choice Award	Captain Marvel	Nominated	
