= Michael J. Neufeld =

Canadian historian and author

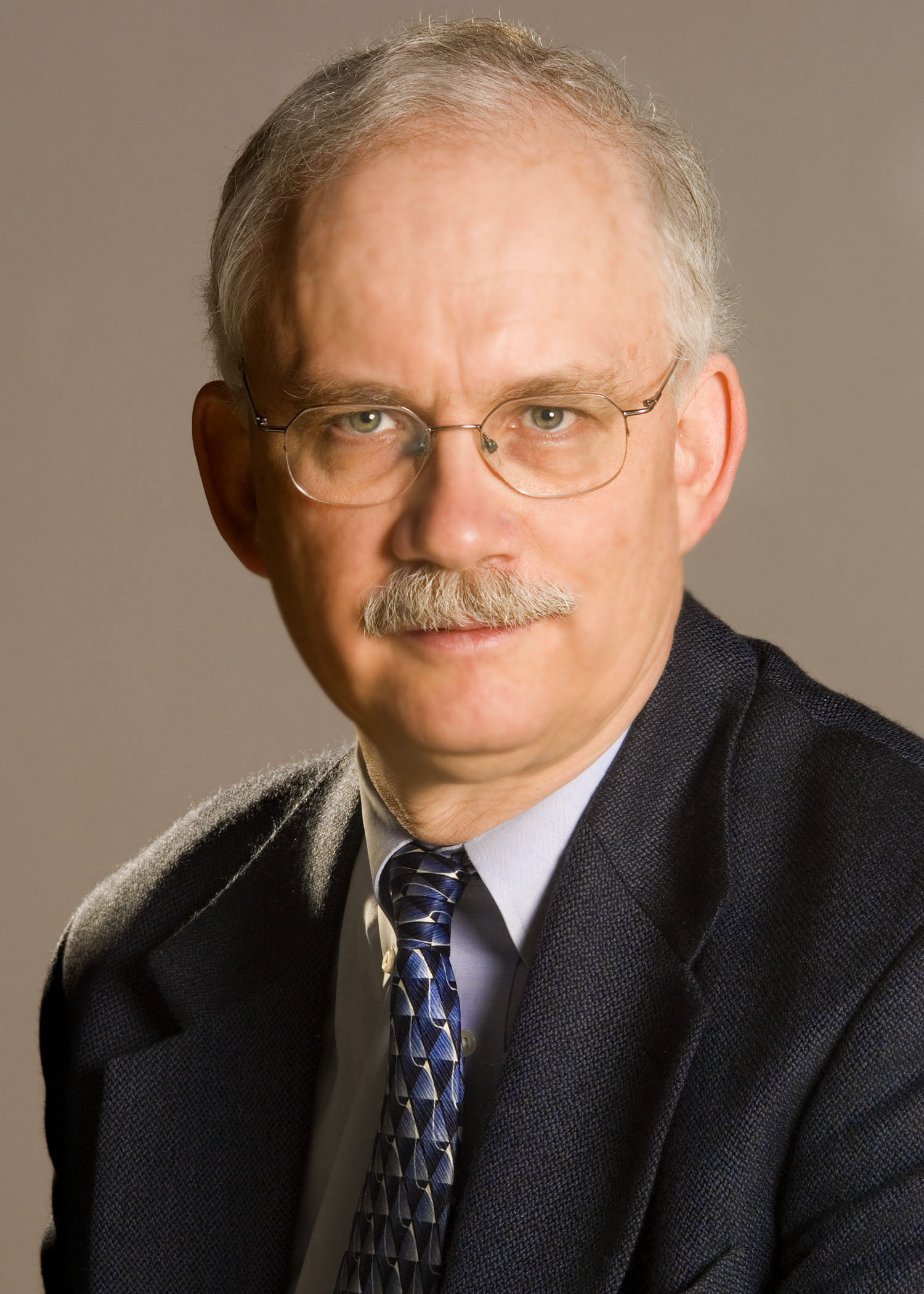
- Neufeld in 2013
- Born: July 7, 1951 (age 75); Edmonton, Alberta, Canada
- Education: University of Calgary (BA); University of British Columbia (MA); Johns Hopkins University (MA, PhD)
- Occupations: Author; historian
- Spouse(s): Sheila Weiss (m. 1983–1992) Karen Levenback (m. 1994)

Michael John Neufeld (born July 7, 1951) is a Canadian historian and author. He chaired the Space History Division at the Smithsonian's National Air and Space Museum from 2007 to 2011, and continues to be a curator there.

== Biography ==
Neufeld was born in Edmonton, Alberta, in 1951. He received a bachelor's degree from the University of Calgary, and a Master of Arts from the University of British Columbia in 1976 with his thesis "He who will not work, neither shall he eat": German social democratic attitudes to labor, 1890-1914. He received his Ph.D. from Johns Hopkins University in 1984 with the dissertation From artisans to workers: the transformation of the skilled metalworkers of Nuremberg, 1835-1905.

Since the 1990s, Neufeld has written several works about Wernher von Braun.

== Books ==
=== Books written ===
- The Skilled Metalworkers of Nuremberg: Craft and Class in the Industrial Revolution. New Brunswick: Rutgers University Press, 1989.
- The Rocket and the Reich: Peenemünde and the Coming of the Ballistic Missile Era. New York: Free Press, 1995. The book won the American Institute of Aeronautics and Astronautics's History Manuscript Award, and the Society for the History of Technology's Dexter Prize.
  - Translated into German by Jens Wagner as Die Rakete und das Reich: Wernher von Braun, Peenemünde und der Beginn des Raketenzeitalters. ISBN 9783894881177
  - Review by Kees Gispen, Central European History. 31, no. 4, (1998): 474.
- Von Braun: Dreamer of Space, Engineer of War. New York: A.A. Knopf, 2007. The book won the Organization of American Historians's Leopold Prize, and the American Astronautical Society's Eugene M. Emme Award for Astronautical Literature.
  - Translated into German as Wernher von Braun: Visionär des Weltraums, Ingenieur des Krieges.
  - Translated into Danish as Wernher von Braun: krigsingeniør og rumfartsvisionær.
  - Translated into Polish as Von Braun: [inżynier nazistów i Amerykanów].

=== Books edited ===
- with Yves Béon. (eds.) Planet Dora: a memoir of the Holocaust and the birth of the space age. Boulder, Colorado: WestviewPress, 1997.
- with Michael Berenbaum. (eds.) The Bombing of Auschwitz: Should the Allies Have Attempted It? New York: St. Martin's Press, 2000.
  - Review by Edward L. Homze. The Journal of Military History. 65, no. 3, (2001): 846.
  - Review by Willard Allen Fletcher. Holocaust and Genocide Studies. 15, no. 3, (2001): 503.
- with Alex M. Spencer. (eds.) Smithsonian National Air and Space Museum: An Autobiography. Washington, D.C: National Geographic Society, 2010.
- Spacefarers: Images of Astronauts and Cosmonauts in the Heroic Era of Spaceflight. Washington, D.C.: Smithsonian Institution Scholarly Press, 2013.
- Milestones of Space: Eleven Iconic Objects from the Smithsonian National Air and Space Museum. Minneapolis, Minnesota: Smithsonian National Air and Space Museum in association with Zenith Press, 2014.
