= How to Make a Spaceship =

Non-fiction book by Julian Guthrie

- Author: Julian Guthrie
- Audio read by: Rob Shapiro
- Working title: Beyond
- Language: English
- Subject: Spaceflight
- Genre: Non-fiction
- Publisher: Penguin Books, Random House
- Publication date: September 2016
- Publication place: United States
- Media type: Hardcover; Softcover trade paperback; CD audiobook; Digital-file audiobook; Digital-file e-book
- Pages: 448
- ISBN: 978-1101980491
- OCLC: 1011116852
- Website: How to Make a Spaceship

How to Make a Spaceship: A Band of Renegades, an Epic Race, and the Birth of Private Spaceflight is a 2016 non-fiction book by journalist Julian Guthrie about the origins of the X Prize Foundation and Peter Diamandis, the first X Prize, the Ansari X Prize and Anousheh Ansari, the entrants into that suborbital spaceflight competition, and the winning team, Mojave Aerospace Ventures of Vulcan Inc., Paul G. Allen, Scaled Composites, Burt Rutan, and their platform of Tier One of SpaceShipOne and WhiteKnightOne.

== Synopsis ==
The book is an overview of what led to the creation of the X Prize, and the running of that first X Prize. Profiles of the major players in the X Prize initiative are included in the book. It chronologically starts with the influences that weighed upon Peter Diamandis, and his progression into the space industry. It also covers the process to get funding, rejections, and the arrival of the Ansaris, becoming title sponsors. The book surveys several of the teams that entered into the competition to win the Ansari X Prize. The team that is focused on most is that which won the X Prize in 2004, the one headed by Paul Allen and Burt Rutan, of SpaceShipOne. The book ends with an epilogue about Richard Branson's Virgin Galactic acquiring the SpaceShipOne technology, and the spaceplane itself ending up in the Smithsonian National Air and Space Museum. The book includes a preface by Richard Branson and an afterword by Stephen Hawking.

== Publication ==
The book was originally entitled Beyond: Peter Diamandis and the Adventure of Space, when it was sold preemptively to Penguin Books in 2014. How to Make a Spaceship was released in September 2016, in trade paperback, hardcover, audio book and e-book formats. The book appeared on several "Best Of" book lists and became a New York Times bestseller. Several parties expressed interest in obtaining the filming rights to the book.

== Reception ==
Gregg Easterbrook's review in The Wall Street Journal said the book "offers a rousing anthem to the urge to explore".

== Awards and honors ==
- Finalist – 2017 PEN/E. O. Wilson Literary Science Writing Award (announced January 2017)
- Winner – 2016 Eugene M. Emme Astronautical Literature Award (announced September 2017)

== See also ==
- Ansari X Prize
- Black Sky: The Race For Space, 2004 Discovery Channel television documentary about the Ansari X Prize
- Elon Musk: Tesla, SpaceX, and the Quest for a Fantastic Future, 2015 book by Ashlee Vance, biography of Elon Musk
- The Right Stuff, 1979 book by Tom Wolfe about the U.S. side of the Cold War Space Race
- The Spirit of St. Louis, 1953 book by Charles A. Lindbergh, autobiography and memoir of the famous solo non-stop trans-Atlantic flight for the Orteig Prize win
