= Columbia Accident Investigation Board =

Space Shuttle Columbia disaster commission

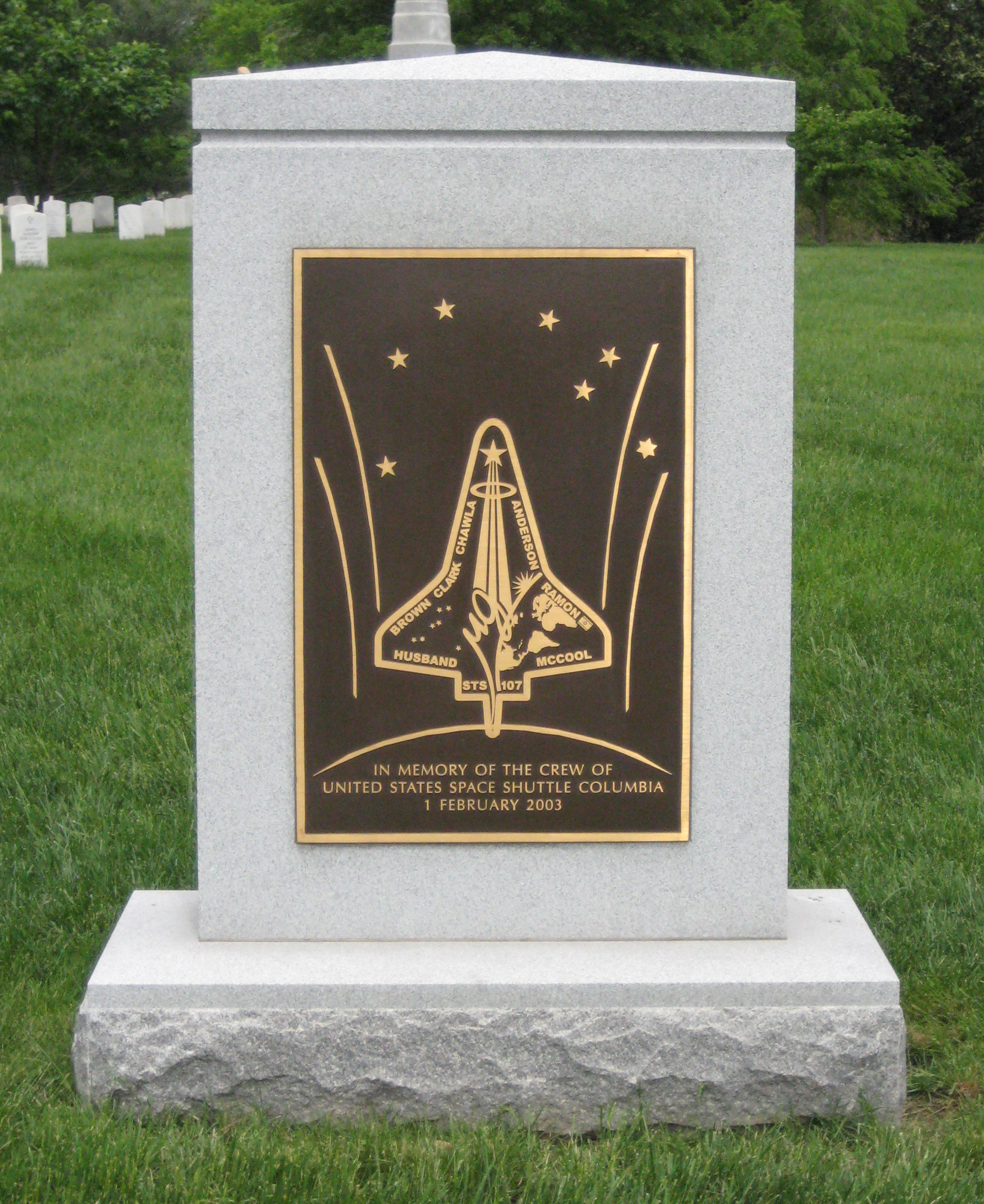
Columbia memorial in Arlington National Cemetery

The Columbia Accident Investigation Board (CAIB) was an internal commission convened by NASA to investigate the destruction of the Space Shuttle Columbia during STS-107 upon atmospheric re-entry on February 1, 2003. The panel determined that the accident was caused by foam insulation breaking off from the external fuel tank, forming debris which damaged the orbiter's wing, and that the problem of "debris shedding" was well known but considered "acceptable" by management. The panel also recommended changes that should be made to increase the safety of future shuttle flights. The CAIB released its final report on August 26, 2003.

== Major findings ==
The board found both the immediate physical cause of the accident and also what it called organizational causes.

=== Immediate cause of the accident ===
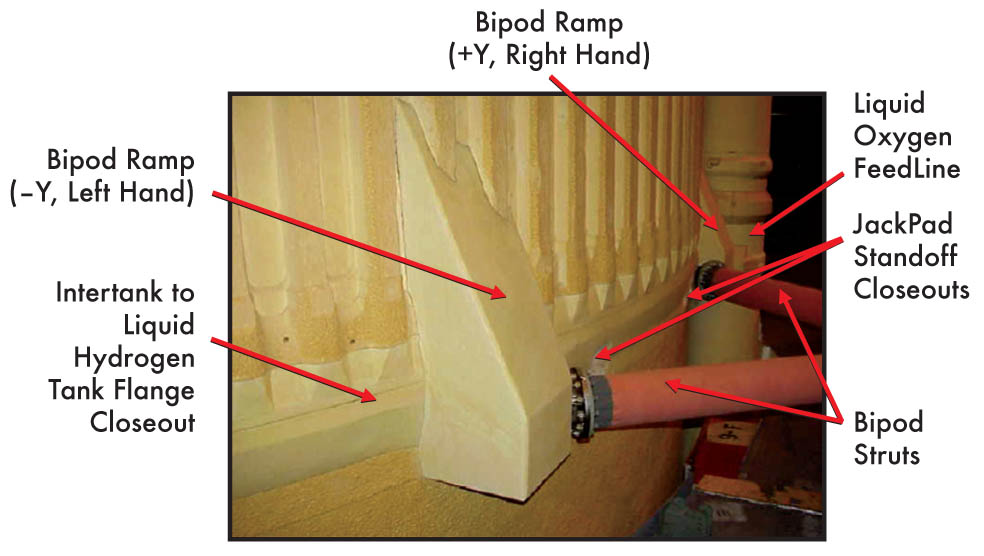
Close-up photo of left Bipod Foam Ramp

82 seconds after launch a large piece of foam insulating material, the "left bipod foam ramp", broke free from the external tank and struck the leading edge of the shuttle's left wing, damaging the protective carbon heat shielding panels.

During re-entry into the Earth's atmosphere, this damage allowed super-heated gases to enter and erode the inner wing structure which led to the destruction of Columbia. It was the seventh instance of a piece of foam, from this particular area of the external tank, breaking free during launch, and the only instance of structural damage as a result of the breakage.

=== Organizational cause of the accident ===
The problem of debris shedding from the external tank was well known and had caused shuttle damage on every prior shuttle flight. The damage was usually, but not always, minor. Over time, management gained confidence that it was an acceptable risk. NASA decided that it did not warrant an extra EVA (extravehicular activity) for visual inspection, with one official Sean O'Keefe dismissing the event as "the functional equivalent...of a Styrofoam cooler blowing off a pickup truck ahead of you on the highway".

== Board recommendations ==
The board made 29 specific recommendations to NASA to improve the safety of future shuttle flights. These recommendations include:

- Foam from external tank should not break free
- Better pre-flight inspection routines
- Increase quality of images available of shuttle during ascent and on-flight
- Recertify all shuttle components by the year 2010
- Establish an independent Technical Engineering Authority that is responsible for technical requirements and all waivers to them, and will build a disciplined, systematic approach to identifying, analyzing, and controlling hazards throughout the life cycle of the Shuttle System.
- Retire the space shuttle.

Only two further Space Shuttle missions were allowed to be flown before the implementation of these recommendations.

== Shuttle program after the CAIB report ==
After the CAIB report came out, NASA implemented all recommended changes and flew its first post-Columbia mission in 2005. As part of the CAIB recommendations, the Shuttle carried a 50-foot inspection boom attached to the robot arm, which was used within 24 hours of launch to check the orbiter for damage. As all but one of the post-Columbia missions were concentrated on the International Space Station, primarily to provide a "safe haven" in the event an orbiter was damaged beyond the normal repair methods, NASA implemented a STS-3xx contingency mission program that could launch a rescue orbiter on short notice, similar to the Skylab Rescue that was planned during the Skylab program.

NASA retired the Space Shuttle fleet on July 21, 2011, after completing the ISS and the final flight and subsequent landing of Atlantis. The Shuttle's replacement, Orion, was to have consisted of an Apollo-derived spacecraft launched on the Ares I rocket, which would use a Space Shuttle Solid Rocket Booster as its first stage. Orion would not face the dangers of either an O-ring failure (due to the presence of a launch escape system) or shedding foam (as the spacecraft would be launched in a stack configuration). In addition to ferrying crews to the ISS, the Orion spacecraft was (as part of Project Constellation) to allow NASA to return to the Moon. President Obama signed the NASA Authorization Act 2010 on October 11 which officially brought the Constellation program to an end, replacing it with the Space Launch System (SLS) and Multi-Purpose Crew Vehicle (MPCV) programs to develop the launch vehicle and spacecraft to enable human exploration missions beyond low-Earth orbit.

== Board members ==
Chairman of the board

- Admiral Hal Gehman, USN

Board members

- Rear Admiral Stephen Turcotte, Commander, Naval Safety Center
- Maj. General John Barry, Director, Plans and Programs, Headquarters Air Force Materiel Command
- Maj. General Kenneth W. Hess, Commander, Air Force Safety Center
- Dr. James N. Hallock, Chief, Aviation Safety Division, United States Department of Transportation, Volpe Center
- Mr. Steven B. Wallace, Director of Accident Investigation, Federal Aviation Administration
- Brig. General Duane Deal, Commander, 21st Space Wing, United States Air Force
- Mr. Scott Hubbard, Director, NASA Ames Research Center
- Mr. Roger E. Tetrault, Retired Chairman, McDermott International
- Dr. Sheila E. Widnall, Professor of Aeronautics and Astronautics and Engineering Systems, MIT
- Dr. Douglas D. Osheroff, Professor of Physics and Applied Physics, Stanford University
- Dr. Sally Ride, Former astronaut and professor of Space Science, University of California, San Diego. Previously a board member at the Rogers Commission Report in the Challenger disaster, and the only board member to serve on both the Challenger and Columbia accident boards.
- Dr. John Logsdon, Director of the Space Policy Institute, George Washington University

=== Board support ===
- Ex Officio Member: Lt. Col. Michael J. Bloomfield, NASA Astronaut
- Executive Secretary: Mr. Theron M. Bradley Jr., NASA Chief Engineer

=== Partial list of additional investigators and CAIB support staff ===
- Col Timothy Bair
- Col. Jack Anthony
- Dr. James P. Bagian
- Lt. Col. Richard J. Burgess
- Thomas L. Carter
- Dr. Dwayne A. Day
- Major Tracy Dillinger
- Thomas L. Foster
- CDR Mike Francis
- Howard E. Goldstein
- Lt. Col Patrick A. Goodman
- Lt. Matthew E. Granger
- Ronald K. Gress
- Thomas Haueter
- Dr. Daniel Heimerdinger
- Dennis R. Jenkins
- Dr. Christopher Kirchhoff
- Dr. Gregory T. A. Kovacs
- John F. Lehman
- Jim Mosquera
- Gary Olson
- Gregory Phillips
- David B. Pye
- Lester A. Reingold
- Donald J. Rigali
- Dr. James. W. Smiley
- G. Mark Tanner
- Lt. Col. Wade J. Thompson
- Dr. Edward Tufte
- Bob Vallaster
- Dr. Diane Vaughan, sociologist
- Lt. Col. Donald J. White
- Dr. Paul D. Wilde
- LCDR Johnny R. Wolfe Jr.
- Richard W. Russell
- Mr. Daniel W. Haros
- Dr. Robert E. Green Jr.
- Dr. Stuart E. Rogers
- Dr. Reynaldo J. Gomez
- Michael J. Aftosmis

== See also ==
- Apollo 204 Review Board (Apollo 1 fire)
- Rogers Commission Report – Space Shuttle Challenger disaster report

== Sources ==
- CAIB panel and staff information Retrieved February 15, 2004
- CAIB Final Report, Volume 1 (August 26, 2003)
- STS-107 Investigation Reference Page
- NASA SLS MPCV Retrieved April 30, 2011
