= Asif Azam Siddiqi =

American writer

- Education: Ph.D.
- Alma mater: Texas A&M University; University of Massachusetts-Amherst; Carnegie Mellon University

Asif Azam Siddiqi is a Bangladeshi American space historian and a Guggenheim Fellowship winner. He is a professor of history at Fordham University. He specializes in the history of science and technology and modern Russian history. He has written several books on the history of space exploration.

== Early life and education ==
Siddiqi was born to Hafiz G. A. Siddiqi, Vice-Chancellor of North South University in Dhaka and Najma Siddiqi, a retired professor of philosophy at Jahangirnagar University. Siddiqi received his bachelor's and master's from Texas A&M University. He then completed his M.B.A. from the University of Massachusetts-Amherst and received his Ph.D. from Carnegie Mellon University in 2004 under a National Science Foundation Fellowship to study Cold War science and technologies.

== Career ==
Siddiqi's first book Challenge to Apollo: The Soviet Union and the Space Race, 1945-1974 is widely considered to be the best English-language history of the Soviet space program in print and was identified by The Wall Street Journal as "one of the five best books" on space exploration. This book was later published in paperback in two separate volumes, Sputnik and the Soviet Space Challenge and The Soviet Space Race with Apollo.

Siddiqi's major contribution to space history scholarship has been to apply academic training, theory, and methodology to the study of Soviet space program history. Siddiqi utilized newly available archival materials from Russia, published works such as memoirs, and other sources and essentially pioneered Soviet space history scholarship in the post Cold War-era. Even current Russian-based space history tends to rely heavily upon memoirs and as a result, Siddiqi is acknowledged by Russian space officials as one of the few people conducting original archival research on the subject worldwide. His articles have been published in the leading Russian space journal Novosti kosmonavtiki (News of Cosmonautics) as well as the official history journal of the Russian Academy of Sciences, Voprosy istorii estestvoznaniia i tekhniki (Problems in the History of Natural Sciences and Technology). He also regularly publishes pieces in the Moscow English language daily, Moscow Times.

He is a currently serving on the United States National Research Council's Committee on Human Spaceflight, tasked by Congress to evaluate and recommend options for the future of NASA's human spaceflight program.

Siddiqi is also the editor of the series Rockets and People which are the four volume English-language translation of the memoirs of Boris Chertok, a leading designer who worked under Sergei Korolev. These volumes are being published by the NASA History Division.

He was featured in the NOVA WGBH-TV special Astrospies broadcast in 2008, and has been featured in various media as a specialist in the history of spaceflight.

He has received the American Historical Association's Fellowship in Aerospace history, the Eugene M. Emme Astronautical Literature Award, the History Manuscript Award from the American Institute of Aeronautics and Astronautics, and a National Science Foundation award for work on his Ph.D. dissertation.

== Works ==
Siddiq's most recent book The Red Rockets' Glare: Spaceflight and the Soviet Imagination, 1857-1957 (Cambridge, 2010) recovered the social and cultural roots of cosmic enthusiasm in the Russian context dating back to the 19th century. He has published widely in many different journals, including the Osiris, Technology and Culture, History and Technology, Europe-Asia Studies, Acta Astronautica, Air & Space, Journal of the British Interplanetary Society, and Spaceflight.
