= Howard E. McCurdy =

Howard E. McCurdy is professor of public affairs in the public administration and policy department at American University.

McCurdy is considered an expert on space policy and NASA. In 1998, he was selected to be the Charles A. Lindbergh Chair in Aerospace History, a one-year fellowship at the National Air and Space Museum.

McCurdy received his bachelor's and master's degrees from the University of Washington and his Ph.D. from Cornell University.

Elizabeth Hand reviewed McCurdy's history of the U.S. space program: "In Space and the American Imagination, Howard McCurdy doesn't give us the right stuff but the real stuff, the minutiae of policy debate and political razzing that brought the space program into being and seems destined to bury it. It's a meandering, sometimes confusingly organized book, but an important one. McCurdy's prose style is understated and occasionally drab, but free of annoying postmodern tics . . . the book assembles a fascinating congeries of facts and fictions about trips to the moon, real or imagined."

== Publications ==
- McCurdy, Howard E. with David H. Rosenbloom, editors, Revisiting Waldo's Administrative State: Constancy and Change in Public Administration, Georgetown University Press, 2006.
- McCurdy, Howard E., Faster, Better, Cheaper: Low-Cost Innovation in the U.S. Space Program, Johns Hopkins University Press, 2001.
- McCurdy, Howard E., Space and the American Imagination, Smithsonian Institution Press, 1997, ISBN 978-1-5609-8764-2
  - revised second edition, Johns Hopkins University Press, 2011, ISBN 978-0-8018-9868-6
