= NASA Distinguished Service Medal =

Highest award bestowed by the NASA

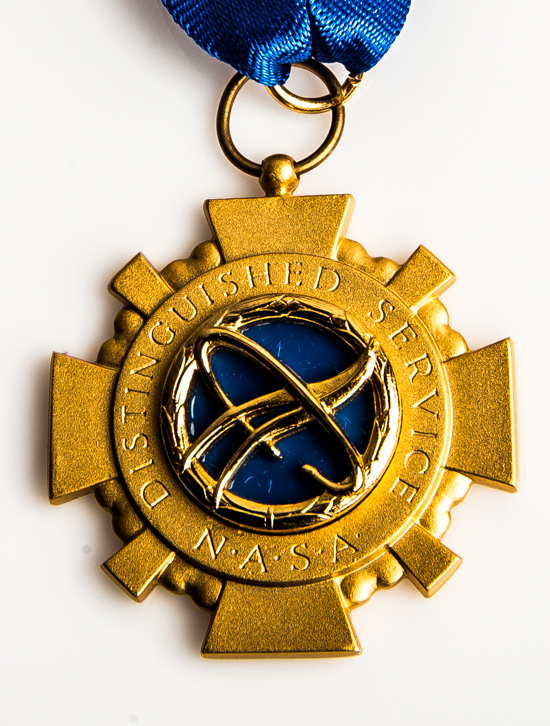
- NASA Distinguished Service Medal
- Type: Military medal Distinguished service medal
- Awarded for: "distinguished service, ability, or courage, [that] has...made a contribution representing substantial progress to aeronautical or space exploration in the interests of the United States"
- Country: United States
- Presented by: the National Aeronautics and Space Administration
- Eligibility: Federal government employees
- Status: Active
- Established: July 29, 1959
- First award: 1959
- NASA Distinguished Service Ribbon

Precedence
- Next (higher): Congressional Space Medal of Honor
- Equivalent: Distinguished Public Service Medal
- Next (lower): Outstanding Leadership Medal

The NASA Distinguished Service Medal is the highest award that can be bestowed by the National Aeronautics and Space Administration of the United States. The medal may be presented to any member of the federal government, including both military astronauts and civilian employees.

The NASA Distinguished Service Medal is awarded to those who display distinguished service, ability, or courage, and have personally made a contribution representing substantial progress to the NASA mission. The contribution must be so extraordinary that other forms of recognition would be inadequate.

Typical presentations of the NASA Distinguished Service Medal included awards to senior NASA administrators, mission control leaders, and astronauts who have completed several successful space flights. Due to the prestige of the award, the decoration is authorized for wear on active uniforms of the United States military. Another such authorized decoration is the NASA Space Flight Medal.

Upon the recommendation of NASA, the president may award an even higher honor to astronauts, the Congressional Space Medal of Honor.

The medal was original awarded by the National Advisory Committee for Aeronautics and was inherited by NASA. The first NASA version (type I), featuring the NASA seal, was issued from 1959 until 1964, when it was replaced by the current type II medal (shown).

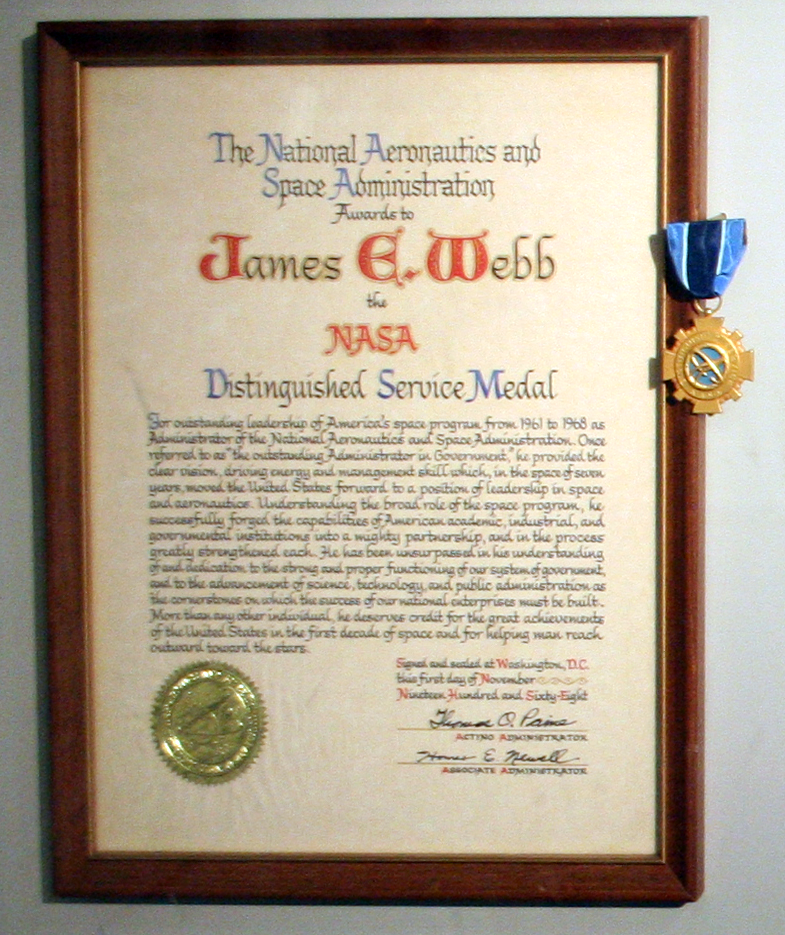
James Webb's award, 1 November 1968

== Recipients ==
=== 1959 ===
- John W. Crowley, NASA Director of Aeronautical and Space Research

=== 1961 ===
- Alan Shepard (May 8)
- Virgil I. Grissom (July 22)

=== 1962 ===
- John Glenn
- Robert Gilruth
- Scott Carpenter
- Wally Schirra (October 15)
- Forrest S. Petersen, X-15 pilot
- Robert White, X-15 pilot
- Joseph A. Walker, X-15 pilot
- Walter C. Williams

=== 1963 ===
- Gordon Cooper

=== 1965 ===
- Wally Schirra (December 30) (second award)

=== 1966 ===
- Hugh L. Dryden
- T. Keith Glennan
- Charles W. Mathews
- George E. Mueller
- Bernard A. Schriever

=== 1967 ===
- Raymond L. Bisplinghoff
- Edgar M. Cortright
- Homer E. Newell
- Walter D. Sohier
- Floyd L. Thompson

=== 1968 ===
- James Webb
- Alexander Flax

=== 1969 ===
- William A. Anders
- Frank A. Bogart
- Carroll H. Bolender
- Frank Borman
- Robert E. Bourdeau
- Eugene A. Cernan
- Roger B. Chaffee
- John F. Clark
- Raymond L. Clark
- Ozro M. Covington
- Kurt H. Debus
- Maxime A. Faget
- Robert R. Gilruth
- Harry H. Gorman
- Virgil I. Grissom (second award)
- Hans F. Gruene
- George H. Hage
- Wesley L. Hjornevik
- Lee B. James
- David M. Jones
- Kenneth S. Kleinknecht
- Christopher C. Kraft
- James A. Lovell
- George M. Low
- Charles W. Matthews
- Alexander A. McCool
- James A. McDivitt
- Jessie L. Mitchell
- George E. Mueller
- John E. Naugle
- Edmund F. O'Connor
- Rocco A. Petrone
- Samuel C. Phillips
- Joseph Purcell
- Eberhard F. M. Rees
- Ludie G. Richard
- Arthur Rudolph
- Julian W. Scheer
- William C. Schneider
- Russell L. Schweickart
- David R. Scott
- Robert C. Seamans
- Willis H. Shapley
- Albert F. Siepert
- Donald K. Slayton
- Thomas P. Stafford
- Gerald M. Truszynski
- Wernher von Braun
- Hermann K. Weidner
- Edward H. White
- John S. Williams
- John W. Young

=== 1970 ===
- Edwin E. Aldrin
- Neil A. Armstrong
- Alan L. Bean
- Michael Collins
- Charles Conrad
- Richard F. Gordon
- Fred W. Haise
- James A. Lovell (second award)
- Thomas O. Paine
- John L. Swigert

=== 1971 ===
- Charles J. Donlan
- James B. Irwin
- Vincent L. Johnson
- Walter J. Kapryan
- Eugene F. Kranz
- Bruce T. Lundin
- Glynn S. Lunney
- James A. McDivitt
- Edgar D. Mitchell
- Bernard Moritz
- Dale D. Myers
- Oran W. Nicks
- Stuart A. Roosa
- David R. Scott (second award)
- Alan B. Shepard (second award)
- Sigurd A. Sjoberg
- John W. Townsend Jr.
- Alfred M. Worden

=== 1972 ===
- Charles M. Duke
- Paul Werner Gast
- William R. Lucas
- Hans M. Mark
- Thomas K. Mattingly
- Richard C. McCurdy
- William T. Pecora
- Dan Schneiderman
- John W. Young (second award)

=== 1973 ===
- George W. S. Abbey
- Alan L. Bean (second award)
- Leland F. Belew
- Charles A. Berry
- Aleck C. Bond
- Anthony J. Calio
- Eugene A. Cernan (second award)
- Aaron Cohen
- Charles Conrad (second award)
- Richard W. Cook
- John H. Disher
- Paul C. Donnelly
- Ronald E. Evans
- Arnold W. Frutkin
- Owen K. Garriott
- Ernst Geissler
- Roy E. Godfrey
- Robert H. Gray
- George B. Hardy
- Robert C. Hock
- William P. Horton
- S. Neil Hosenball
- Roy P. Jackson
- Richard S. Johnston
- Joseph P. Kerwin
- James E. Kingsbury
- Jack A. Kinzler
- Kenneth S. Kleinknecht (second award)
- Joseph N. Kotanchik
- Chester M. Lee
- William E. Lilly
- Jack R. Lousma
- Owen G. Morris
- Rocco A. Petrone
- Isom A. Rigell
- Miles Ross
- George T. Sasseen
- Harrison H. Schmitt
- William C. Schneider
- Richard G. Smith
- Howard W. Tindall
- Paul J. Weitz

=== 1974 ===
- Donald D. Buchanan
- Gerald P. Carr
- Walker E. Giberson
- Edward G. Gibson
- Charles F. Hall
- Robert L. Krieger
- Dale D. Myers
- William R. Pogue
- Norman Pozinsky
- Martin L. Raines
- Lee R. Scherer
- John M. Thole
- Robert F. Thompson

=== 1975 ===
- Vance D. Brand
- Robert H. Curtin
- M. P. Frank
- Donald P. Hearth
- Chester M. Lee
- Glynn S. Lunney
- Joseph B. Mahon
- Ellery B. May
- John L. McLucas
- William Nordberg
- George F. Page
- Donald K. Slayton (second award)
- Thomas P. Stafford (second award)
- David Williamson Jr.

=== 1976 ===
- Charles J. Donlan
- Isaac T. Gillam
- Charles R. Gunn
- William M. Lohse
- Charles W. Mathews
- John J. Neilon
- Leonard Roberts
- William R. Schindler

=== 1977 ===
- Edgar M. Cortright
- Malcolm R. Currie
- James C. Fletcher
- Noel W. Hinners
- Leonard Jaffe
- Harriett G. Jenkins
- Robert S. Kraemer
- Bruce T. Lundin
- Hans M. Mark
- James S. Martin
- John E. Naugle
- Henry W. Norris
- A. Thomas Young

=== 1978 ===
- Kenneth R. Chapman
- Duward Crow
- Robert H. Curtin
- Marvin L. McNickle
- David R. Scott (Third Award)
- Milton O. Thompson
- Gerald M. Truszynski

=== 1980 ===
- William H. Bayley

=== 1981 ===
- Robert L. Crippen
- Paul C. Donnelly
- Howard S. Hardcastle
- James B. Odom
- Andrew J. Stofan
- John F. Yardley
- Walter C. Williams (second award)
- David Williamson Jr. (second award)

=== 1982 ===
- Anthony J. Calio
- Clifford E. Charlesworth
- Charles G. Fullerton
- Ashton Graybiel
- Henry W. Hartsfield
- Jack R. Lousma
- John F. McCarthy
- Thomas K. Mattingly
- Joseph D. Mirth
- Bruce C. Murray
- Donald K. Slayton
- Robert E. Smylie
- Charles H. Terhune

=== 1983 ===
- Robert F. Allnutt
- Richard C. Henry
- Jack L. Kerrebrock
- Robert O. Piland
- Stanley I. Weiss

=== 1984 ===
- Robert O. Aller

=== 1985 ===
- John W. Boyd
- Robert L. Crippen
- S. Neil Hosenball
- Samuel W. Keller
- Robert E. Lindstrom
- Glynn S. Lunney
- William R. Marshall
- Donald K. Slayton

=== 1986 ===
- Gerald D. Griffin
- Alton E. Jones
- Richard P. Laeser
- William R. Lucas
- Ronald E. McNair
- Norman F. Ness
- Ellison S. Onizuka
- Francis R. Scobee
- Michael J. Smith
- Richard G. Smith

=== 1987 ===
- Leslie H. Meredith

=== 1988 ===
- Willis H. Shapley (second award)

=== 1989 ===
- William F. Ballhaus Sr.
- James M. Beggs
- Forrest S. McCartney
- James B. Odom
- Robert B. Sieck
- Willis H. Shapley
- Thomas E. Utsman
- Robert T. Watson

=== 1990 ===
- Lew Allen
- Robert L. Gibson
- John M. Klineberg
- Richard H. Petersen
- Brewster H. Shaw Jr.
- John W. Townsend Jr.

=== 1991 ===
- John R. Casani

=== 1992 ===
- Berrien Moore III
- Mark Albrecht
- Story Musgrave

=== 1993 ===
- Gary B. Allison
- Charles F. Bolden Jr.
- Julian Caballero Jr.
- Aaron Cohen
- Robert L. Crippen
- Martin C. Faga
- Edward A. Frankle
- Robert L. Gibson
- Donald G. Hard
- Richard H. Kohrs
- Charles J. Pellerin
- Richard N. Richards
- Brewster H. Shaw
- Loren J. Shriver
- Gary L. Tesch
- Milton O. Thompson

=== 1994 ===
- Joseph H. Rothenberg

=== 1995 ===
- Bill G. Aldridge

=== 1996 ===
- Gerald M. Smith
- William J. O'Neil

=== 1997 ===
- Jerome Apt

=== 2000 ===
- Joseph H. Rothenberg

=== 2001 ===
- Jack Brooks
- Claude Nicollier
- Courtney Stadd
- James S. Voss
- Joseph Philip Loftus

=== 2002 ===
- Scott E. Parazynski

=== 2004 ===
- Kalpana Chawla
- William McCool
- Axel Roth
- Brock "Randy" Stone
- Lott W. Brantley Jr.
- G. Scott Hubbard
- Edward T. Lu

=== 2005 ===
- Alphonso V. Diaz
- Firouz Naderi

=== 2006 ===
- Eileen M. Collins

=== 2007 ===
- Douglas Hendriksen

=== 2008 ===
- Walter Cunningham
- Donn Eisele
- Fuk Li
- Walter Schirra (Third Award)
- E. Myles Standish
- Richard Sunseri

=== 2009 ===
- Christopher Scolese
- Stephanie D. Wilson

=== 2010 ===
- David K. Alonso
- Scott D. Altman
- John M. Grunsfeld
- Kenneth M. Ford
- Jeffrey M. Hanley
- John T. James
- Suresh M. Joshi
- William H. Kinard
- Steven J. Ostro
- Mark L. Polansky
- Frederick Sturckow
- Jacob Trombka
- David A. Wolf

=== 2011 ===
- James E. Fesmire
- Richard Fisher
- Richard Grammier
- Dmitri Kondratyev
- Daniel McCleese
- Richard Mushotzky
- Stephen K. Robinson
- Katherine Van Hooser
- Stephanie D. Wilson

=== 2012 ===
- Frank J. Benz
- Byron Butler
- Sam V. Digesu
- Christopher J. Ferguson
- David C. Folta
- Michael E. Fossum
- Mark E. Kelly
- Alan J. Lindenmoyer
- David M. Martin
- Ann McNair
- Robert R. Meyer
- Martin G. Mlynczak
- Philip E. Phillips
- Craig L. Purdy
- Daniel C. Reda
- Joseph Savino
- Phillip A. Sabelhaus
- Peter J. Serlemitsos
- Robert M. Stephens
- Michael T. Suffredini
- Richard Zurek

=== 2013 ===
- David J. Mangus

=== 2015 ===
- Raymond G. Clinton Jr.
- Carl Preston Jones
- Ellen Ochoa

=== 2016 ===
- James O. Arnold
- Perry L. Becker
- Jeri Buchholz
- Ricky W. Butler
- Edward R. Generazio
- Linda M. Jensen
- Jack King
- Jennifer C. Kunz
- Michael F. O'Brien
- William Oegerle
- Patrick Scheuermann
- Piers J. Sellers
- J. William Sikora
- Teresa Vanhooser

=== 2017 ===
- Ellen Ochoa
- Dolores A. Holland
- Dava J. Newman
- Steven J. Kempler
- Michael Hesse
- Paul A. Newman
- Carol Mosier

=== 2018 ===
- Theodore Adams
- Gale Allen
- Christine Belcastro
- John Charles
- Charles Dovale
- Philip Eberspeaker
- James Free
- Cornelis Gehrels
- Pamela Hanes
- Kenneth Human
- Robert Jacobs
- Debra Johnson
- Lauren Leo
- Robert Lightfoot
- Dawn Lowe
- Joel Montalbano
- Ellen Ochoa
- Krista Paquin
- Jonathan Pettus
- Dennis Reuter
- Lesa Roe
- Michael Sampson
- Christopher Singer
- Hanwant Singh
- Gregory Williams
- Josef Wonsever
- Joseph Zawodny

=== 2019 ===
- Richard Antcliff
- Richard Barney
- Darren Bedell
- Dwayne C. Brown
- Thomas Bryan
- Layne Carter
- Ricky Cissom
- Joseph Cuzzupoli
- William DeLoach
- Daniel Dittman
- Edward Fein
- Michael Freilich
- Michael Good
- Tyrell Hawkins
- William Hicks
- Andrew Hunter
- Dorsie Jones
- Vicki Kloeris
- Joseph Madden
- Edward Masuoka
- Todd May
- William Myers
- Jim Reuter
- Melvin Scruggs
- Robert Scully
- Jaiwon Shin
- Patrick Simpkins
- Steven Sullivan
- Eric Thaxton
- Michael Van Houten
- Brenton Weathered
- Terry Wilcutt

=== 2020 ===
- Roy W. Malone, Jr.

=== 2021 ===
- David A. Herda
- Paul K. McConnaughey
- H. Phil Stahl
- Bobby J. Watkins

== See also ==
- List of NASA awards
