= James McDivitt =

American astronaut (1929–2022)

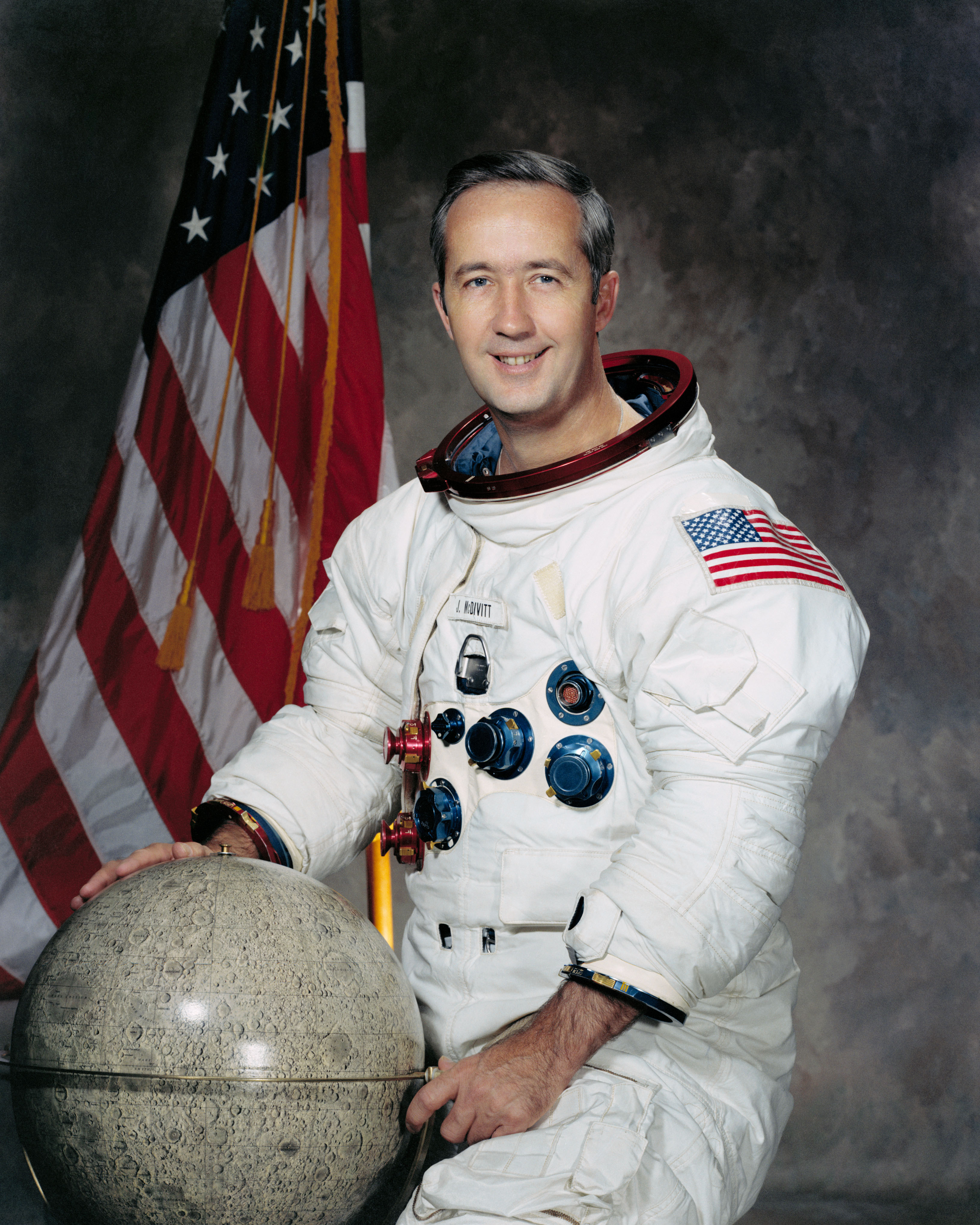
- McDivitt in 1971
- Born: James Alton McDivitt Jr. June 10, 1929; Chicago, Illinois, U.S.
- Died: October 13, 2022 (aged 93); Tucson, Arizona, U.S.
- Education: Jackson College; University of Michigan (BS)
- Spouse(s): Patricia Ann Haas (m. 1956, divorced) Judith Ann Odell (m. 1985)
- Children: 4
- Awards: Distinguished Flying Cross (4); Air Force Distinguished Service Medal (2); Air Medal (5); NASA Distinguished Service Medal (2); NASA Exceptional Service Medal
- Space career

NASA astronaut
- Rank: Brigadier General, USAF
- Time in space: 14d 2h 56m
- Selection: NASA Group 2 (1962)
- Mission: Gemini 4 Apollo 9
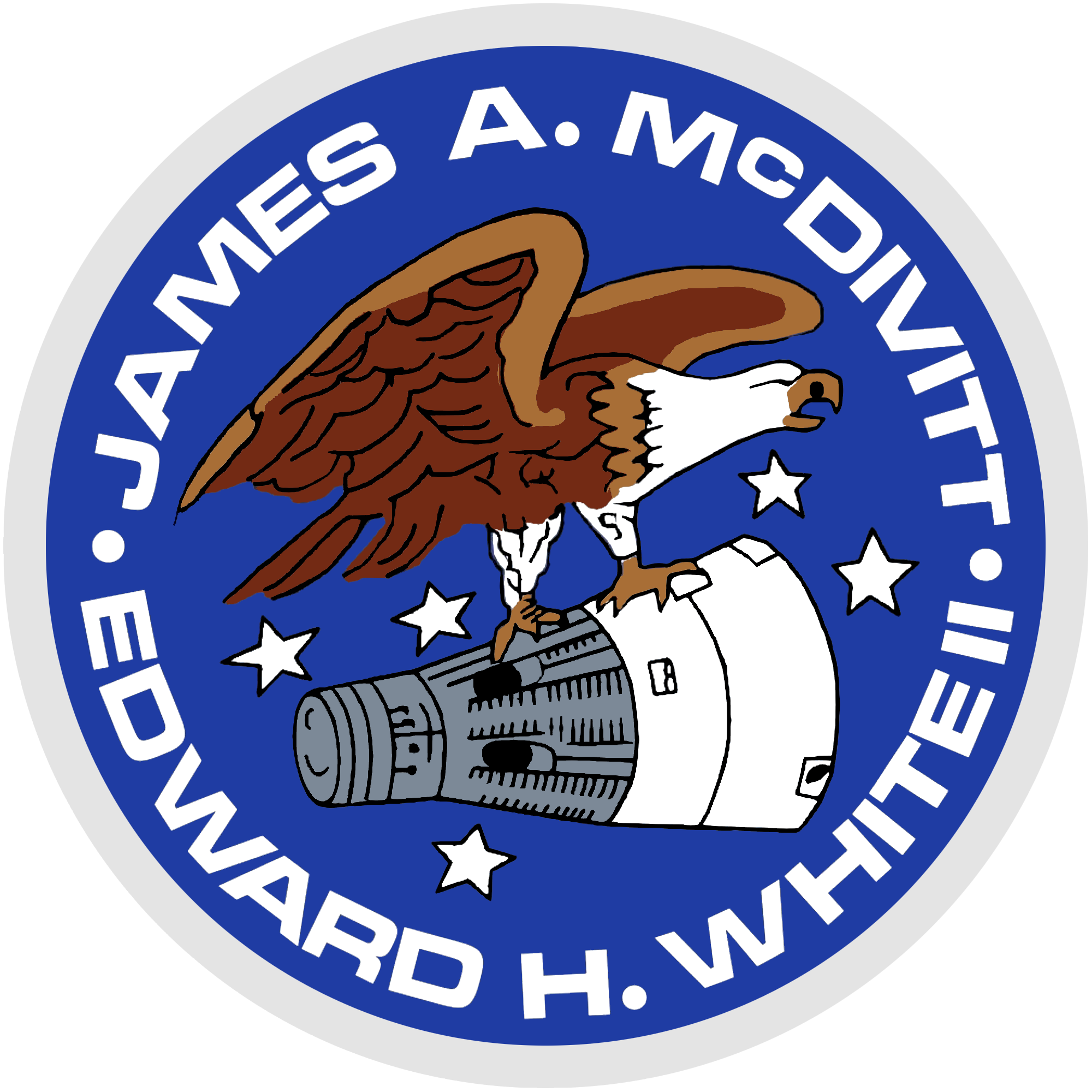
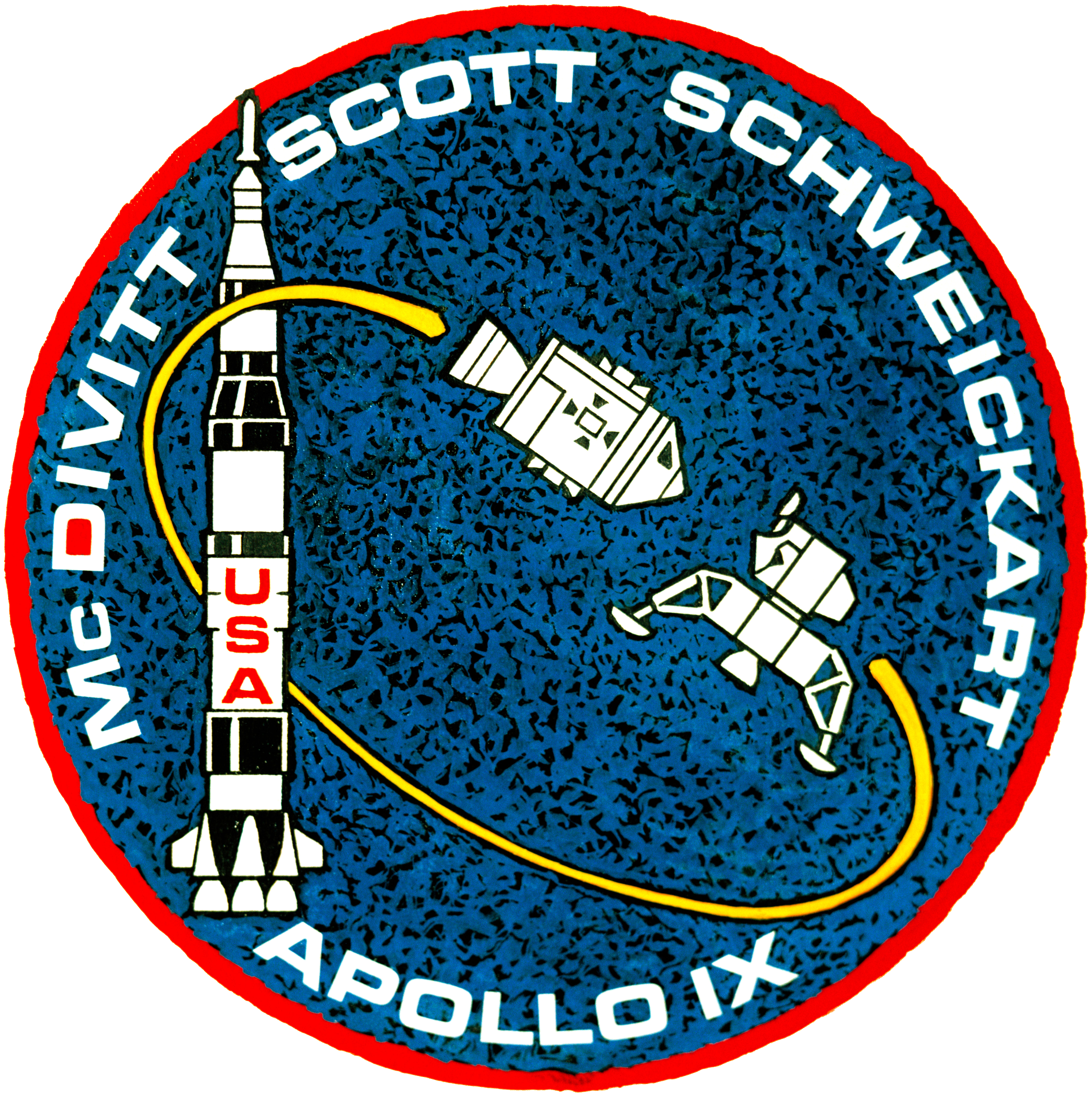
- Mission insignia
- Retired: June 1972

James Alton McDivitt Jr. (June 10, 1929 – October 13, 2022) was an American test pilot, United States Air Force (USAF) pilot, aeronautical engineer, and NASA astronaut in the Gemini and Apollo programs. He joined the USAF in 1951 and flew 145 combat missions in the Korean War. In 1959, after graduating first in his class with a Bachelor of Science degree in Aeronautical Engineering from the University of Michigan through the U.S. Air Force Institute of Technology (AFIT) program, he qualified as a test pilot at the Air Force Experimental Flight Test Pilot School (Class 59C) and Aerospace Research Pilot School (Class I), and joined the Manned Spacecraft Operations Branch. By September 1962, McDivitt had logged over 2,500 flight hours, of which more than 2,000 hours were in jet aircraft. This included flying as a chase pilot for Robert M. White's North American X-15 flight on July 17, 1962, in which White reached an altitude of 59.5 miles (95.8 km) and became the first X-15 pilot to be awarded Astronaut Wings.

In 1962, McDivitt was selected as an astronaut by NASA as part of Astronaut Group 2. He commanded the Gemini 4 mission, during which Ed White performed the first U.S. spacewalk, and later the Apollo 9 flight, which was the first crewed flight test of the Apollo Lunar Module and the complete set of Apollo flight hardware. He later became the manager of lunar landing operations and was the Apollo spacecraft program manager from 1969 to 1972. In June 1972 he left NASA and retired from the USAF with the rank of brigadier general.

== Early life ==
James Alton McDivitt Jr. was born on June 10, 1929, in Chicago, Illinois, the son of Margaret Mary (née Maxwell) and James Alton McDivitt Sr. He was a Boy Scout and earned the rank of Tenderfoot Scout, now the second rank in Scouting (although the first rank at the time). He grew up in Kalamazoo, Michigan and graduated from Kalamazoo Central High School in 1947. He then worked for a year to earn enough money to attend junior college. He completed two years at Jackson Junior College (now known as Jackson College) in Jackson, Michigan, from 1948 to 1950.

== Military service ==
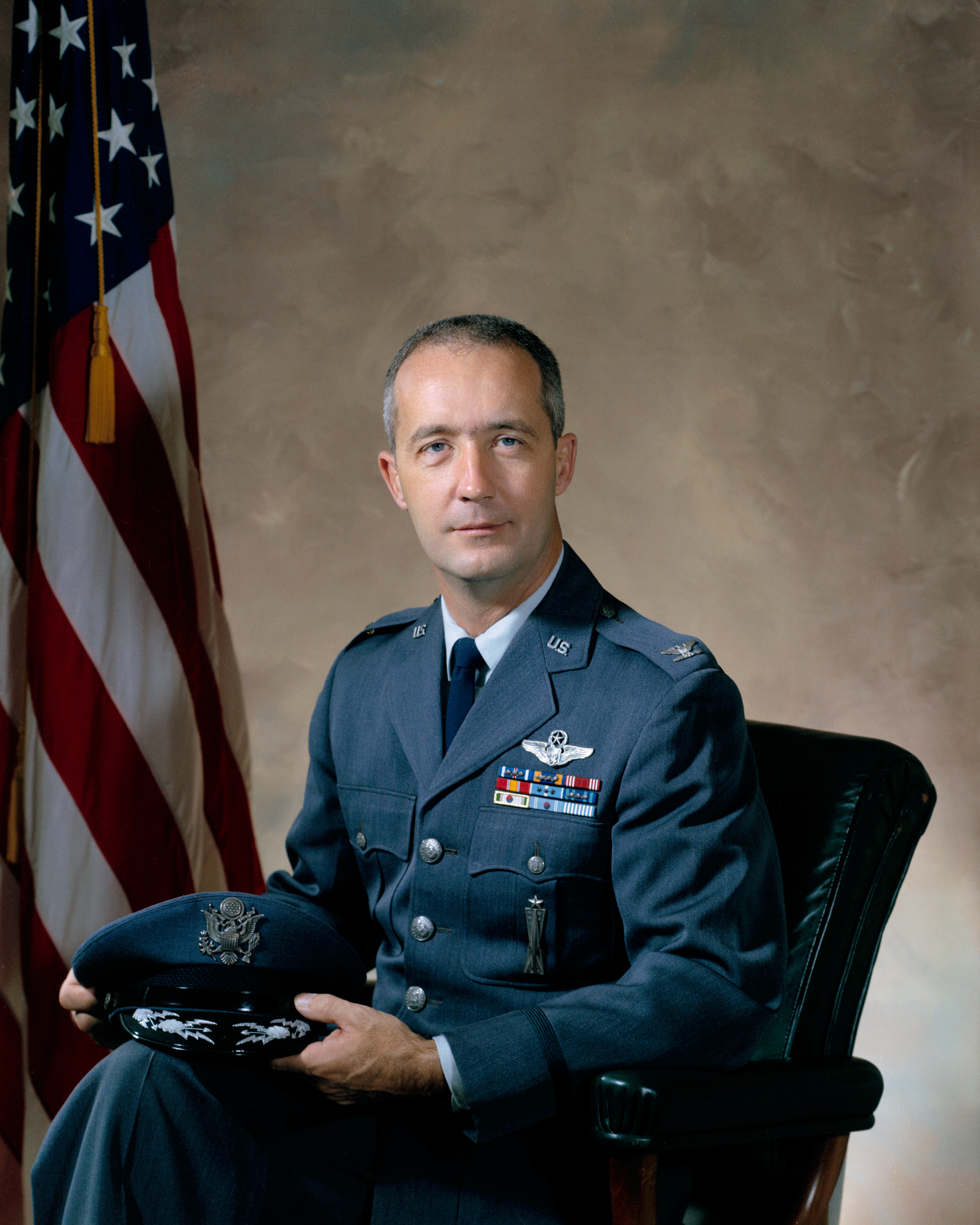
James McDivitt in his Air Force uniform as a colonel

In January 1951, McDivitt joined the United States Air Force (USAF). The Korean War had commenced, and his deferment from the draft expired when he graduated from Jackson Junior College. Rather than wait and be drafted by the Army, he elected to enlist in the USAF as a private, and applied for pilot training under the aviation cadet training program. He performed well in training, and was the first in his class to make a solo flight. He received his pilot wings and regular commission as a second lieutenant in the USAF in May 1952 at Williams Air Force Base, Arizona, and completed combat crew training in November 1952. He flew 145 combat missions in Korea in F-80 Shooting Stars and F-86 Sabres with the 35th Fighter-Bomber Squadron, and earned two Distinguished Flying Crosses. His last mission was flown two hours after the Korean Armistice Agreement was signed.

McDivitt returned to the United States in September 1953 and served as pilot and assistant operations officer with the 19th Fighter Interceptor Squadron at Dow Air Force Base, Maine. In November 1954, he entered advanced flying school at Tyndall Air Force Base, Florida, and in July 1955 went to McGuire Air Force Base, New Jersey, where he served as pilot, operations officer, and later as flight commander with the 332d Fighter Interceptor Squadron. In June 1957, he entered the University of Michigan under the U.S. Air Force Institute of Technology (AFIT) program, and received his Bachelor of Science degree in aeronautical engineering from the University of Michigan, where he graduated first in his class in 1959.

After graduation, he went to Edwards Air Force Base, California, as a student test pilot in June 1959. He remained there with the Air Force Flight Test Center as an experimental flight test pilot, completed the Air Force Experimental Flight Test Pilot School (Class 59C) and Aerospace Research Pilot School (Class I), and joined the Manned Spacecraft Operations Branch in July 1962. By September, McDivitt had logged over 2,500 flight hours, of which more than 2,000 hours was in jet aircraft. This included flying as a chase pilot for Robert M. White's North American X-15 flight on July 17, 1962, in which White reached an altitude of 59.5 miles (95.8 km) and became the first X-15 pilot to be awarded Astronaut Wings based on the USAF definition of space as starting at 50 miles (80 km). (Note: The FAI sets the limit of space at 100 kilometres (62 mi).) McDivitt was in line to fly the X-15 when White left, and to head the project office for testing the McDonnell F-4 Phantom II, but he heard that NASA was looking to select a second group of astronauts to augment the Mercury Seven, and, after some thought, he decided to apply.

== NASA career ==
=== Project Gemini ===
McDivitt was selected as an astronaut by NASA in September 1962 as part of Astronaut Group 2. On July 29, 1964, it was announced that he had been chosen as command pilot of Gemini 4, becoming the first U.S. astronaut to command a crew on his first spaceflight. Only two other Gemini astronauts from this group commanded their first flights: Frank Borman (Gemini 7) and Neil Armstrong (Gemini 8). (Note: Elliot See was slated to command the Gemini 9 mission, but was killed in the crash of a T-38 jet three months before the flight. After Gemini, the only "rookie" to command his first flight was Gerald Carr (Skylab 4).) The Chief of the Astronaut Office, Mercury Seven astronaut Deke Slayton, selected Ed White as his pilot because the two men knew each other well, having attended the University of Michigan and test pilot school together.

The mission objectives were ill-defined at first, but consideration was given to performing extravehicular activity (EVA), space rendezvous and orbital station-keeping. Knowing that EVA (sometimes called a "spacewalk") was a possibility, McDivitt pressed for it to be included in the mission. As a result, NASA management agreed to ensure that the Gemini space suit for the mission was capable of being used for EVA. Kenneth S. Kleinknecht told the July 1964 press conference that announced the mission that one of the crew might open the hatch and stick his head outside, but this attracted little attention. On March 18, 1965, cosmonaut Alexei Leonov became the first man to perform an EVA, on the Voskhod 2 mission, but not until May 25 was EVA approved for Gemini 4 by NASA administrator James E. Webb.

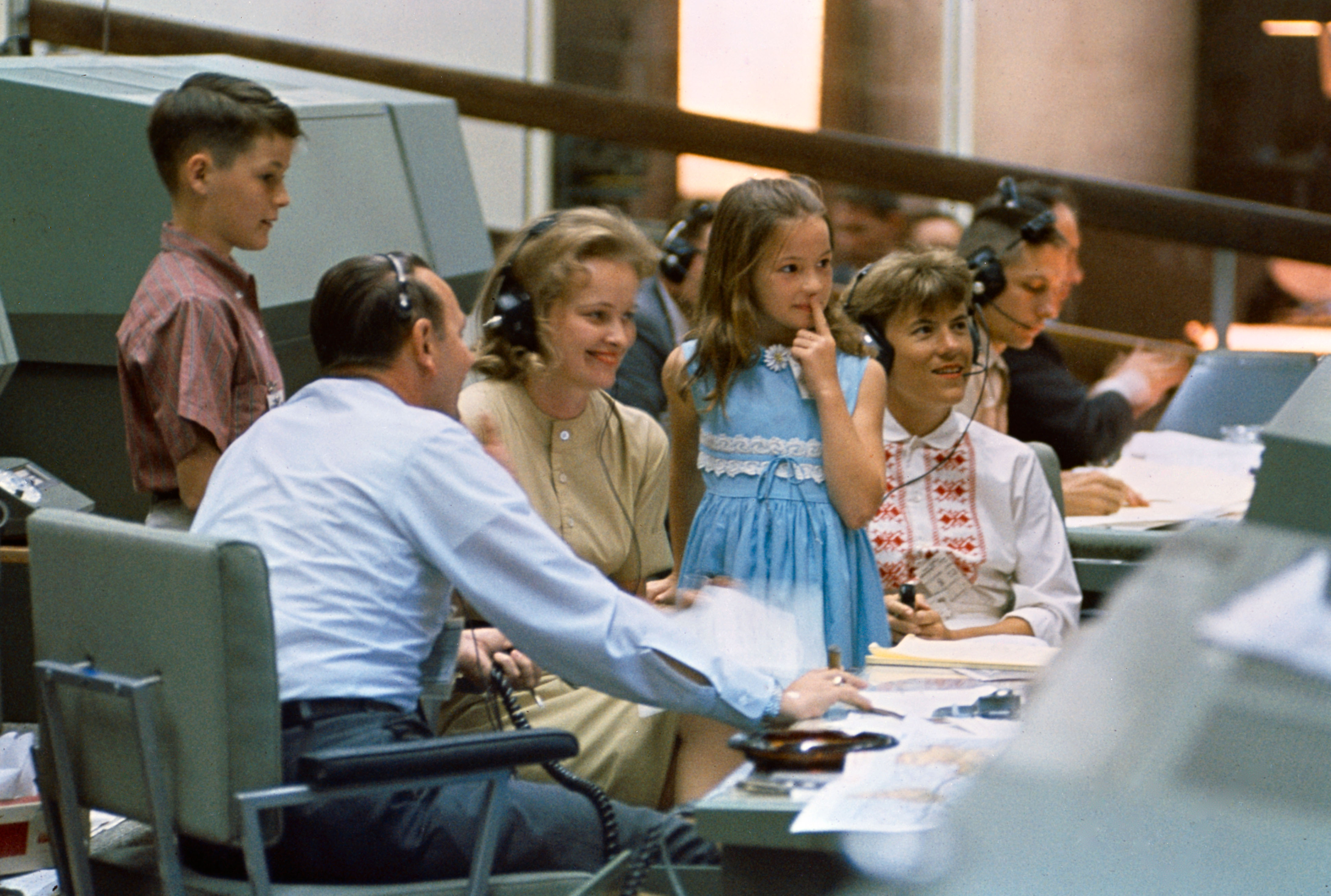
Patricia McDivitt (right) visits Mission Control in Houston during the Gemini 4 mission.

Gemini 4 was launched on June 3, 1965. The mission lasted 97 hours and 56 minutes, and made 62 orbits, The first objective was to attempt the first space rendezvous with the spacecraft's spent Titan II launch vehicle's upper stage. This was not successful; McDivitt was unable to get closer than what he estimated to be 200 feet (61 m). Several factors worked against him. There were depth-perception problems (his and White's visual estimates of the distance differed, variously longer or shorter than each other at different times). The orbital mechanics of rendezvous were not yet well understood by NASA engineers or astronauts; catching up to something requires slowing down. Also, the stage was venting its remaining propellant, which kept pushing it around in different directions relative to the spacecraft.

McDivitt finally broke off the rendezvous attempt in order to save propellant and preserve the second objective, which was for White to perform the first United States EVA. McDivitt controlled the capsule's attitude and photographed White during the "walk". The hatch on Gemini 4, through which White exited to make his walk, was prone to problems with the latch mechanism gears coming unmeshed, making it difficult to open and re-latch the hatch. McDivitt had spent some time before the flight with a McDonnell engineer, improvising a technique of forcing the gears to mesh by inserting the fingers inside the mechanism. The hatch was difficult to open and also to relatch during the flight, but McDivitt was able to get it working both times, with his hands in his pressurized space suit gloves. If he had not been able to get the hatch latched after the spacewalk, both men would have most likely not survived re-entry.

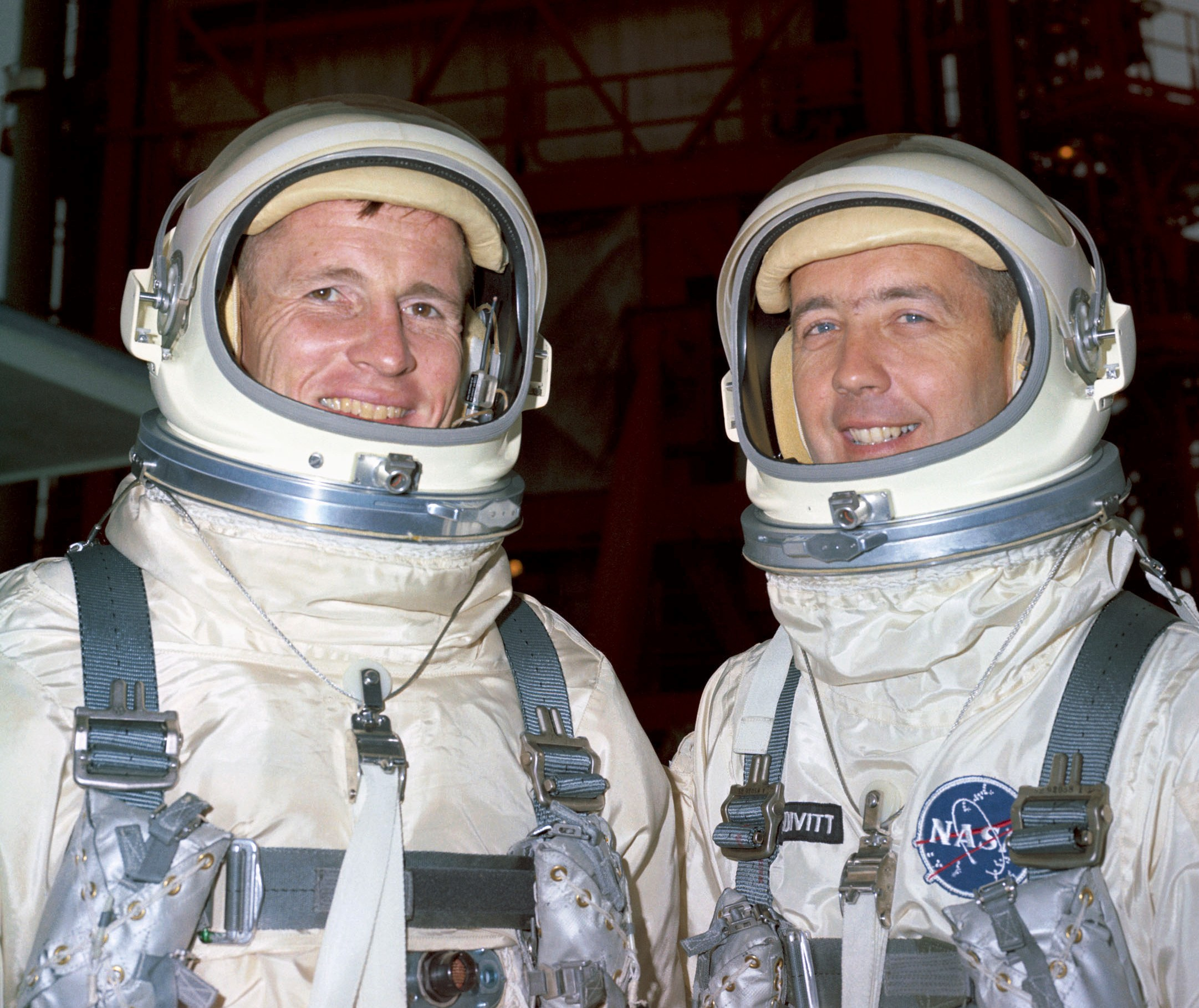
McDivitt (right) and White in their space suits for the Gemini 4 mission

On the second day, over Hawaii, while White was asleep, McDivitt happened to see an unidentified flying object (UFO), which he described as looking "like a beer can or a pop can, and with a little thing like maybe like a pencil or something sticking out of it". He took a few photographs of it, but did not have time to properly set exposure or focus properly. He believes that since it was visible to him, it must have been in an orbit close to that of his spacecraft, probably a piece of ice or multi-layer insulation that had broken off. Word of the "UFO photos" reached the press by the time the flight splashed down, and one eager reporter waited for the Gemini 4 photos to be processed. He found one with a cluster of three or four images that looked like disc-shaped objects with tails, which became known as the "tadpole" photo. McDivitt has identified these as reflections of bolts in the multipaned windows. Mercury Seven astronaut Gordon Cooper wrote in his memoirs that it is the only officially reported account of a UFO in any of the Mercury, Gemini or Apollo missions.

The mission ran into trouble in its final stages when there was a computer failure. Deviating from the flight plan, flight controller Chris Kraft ordered McDivitt to perform a rolling atmospheric entry like the Mercury astronauts had used rather than the lifting bank angle entry that the computer had been intended to help them achieve. On the way down, McDivitt struggled with a stuck thruster, but eventually slowed and ultimately halted the roll rate. The spacecraft overshot its landing point by 80 kilometres (50 mi), but the astronauts were soon reached by the recovery ship, the USS Wasp. The astronauts found that they were now celebrities. President Lyndon B. Johnson came to Houston to congratulate them, and he promoted them to the rank of lieutenant colonel. Later that week they traveled to the White House where Johnson presented them with the NASA Exceptional Service Medal. They were given a ticker tape parade in Chicago, and went to the 1965 Paris Air Show, where they met cosmonaut Yuri Gagarin.

=== Project Apollo ===
On March 21, 1966, NASA announced that McDivitt would be the commander (CDR) of the backup crew of the first crewed Project Apollo mission, known as AS-204. The other members of his crew were Astronaut Group 3 astronauts David Scott and Rusty Schweickart. The prime crew was commanded by Mercury Seven astronaut Gus Grissom, with Ed White and rookie Group 3 astronaut Roger Chaffee. Their mission was to test the Apollo command and service module (CSM) in Earth orbit. By December 1966, hopes that the Apollo spacecraft would be ready to fly in 1966 were fading fast, and NASA announced on December 22 that they were replaced as backups for AS-204 by Wally Schirra, Donn Eisele, and Walt Cunningham, the crew of the original second mission, which was canceled. McDivitt's crew became the prime crew of a new second mission flying both the CSM and the Lunar Module (LM). The Saturn V rocket was not expected to be available, so the mission would be flown with two Saturn IB rockets, one for the CSM and one for the LM. This mission was called AS-205/208. Under the revised schedule, AS-204 would be flown in February 1967, followed by AS-205/208 in August. It was hoped that the Saturn V would be available by the end of the year, and it would be flown as a third mission with Borman as CDR and Group 3 astronauts Michael Collins and Bill Anders.

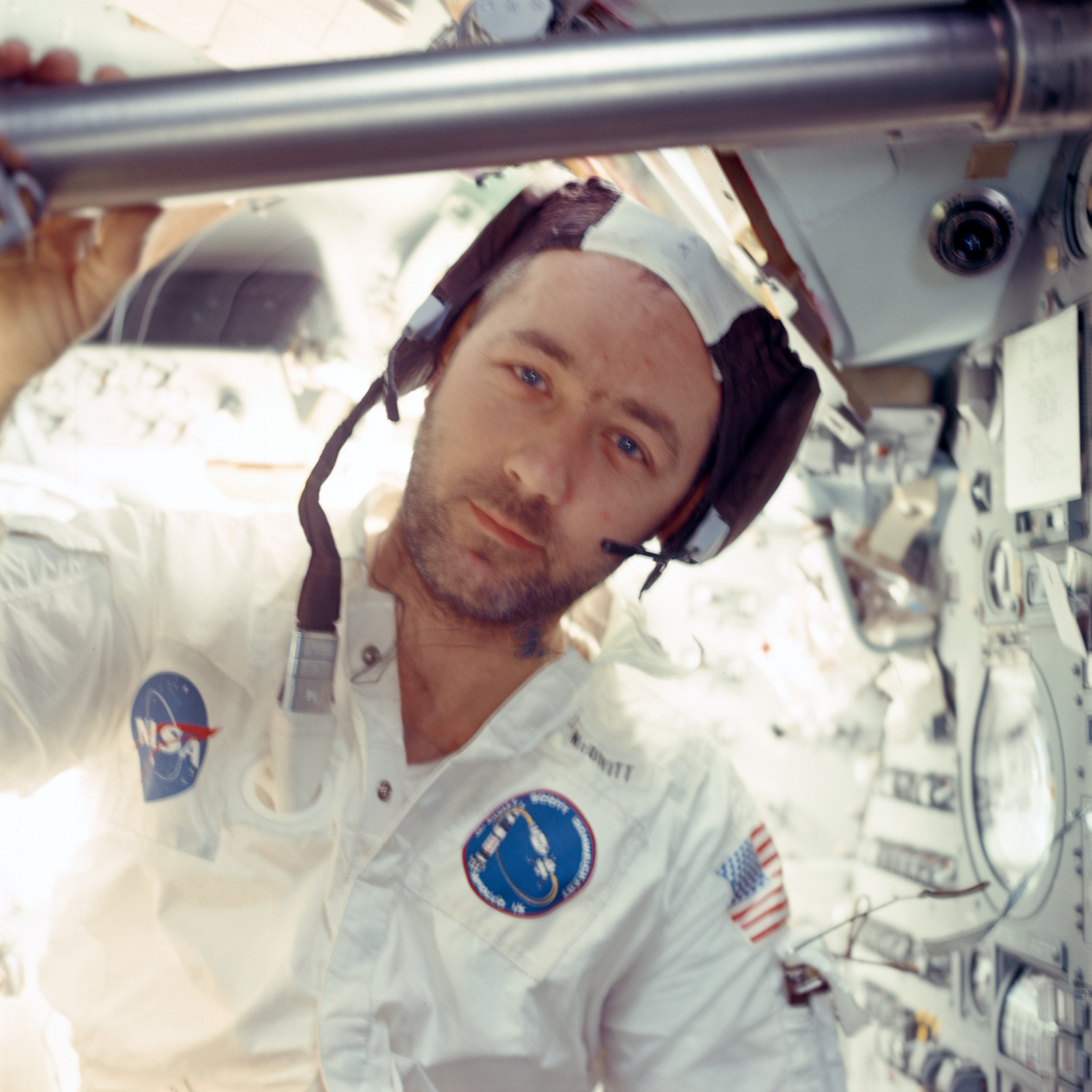
McDivitt inside Command Module Gumdrop during Apollo 9 mission

McDivitt and his crew were training for this mission when disaster struck on January 27, 1967: a cabin fire killed Grissom's crew. All crew assignments were canceled. During the Congressional hearings that followed, McDivitt expressed confidence in NASA's management and safety measures. After the Apollo 1 fire, plans resumed for McDivitt's crew to fly the Lunar Module mission as the second crewed flight. This was officially announced on November 20, 1967. By the summer of 1968, it was expected that the mission would now be flown as Apollo 8 in December with the Saturn V, which was now expected to be available, but it was increasingly clear that the lunar module would not be ready by that time. McDivitt was summoned to Slayton's office. According to McDivitt:

By this time I'd been working on the Lunar Module with Dave and Rusty for a year and a half. I knew something was up when Deke called me in because, for one thing, I knew that the lunar module wasn't likely to be ready before January 1969. Deke explained the situation and said that he wanted me to stick with my original mission—which would now become Apollo 9. But he wasn't going to force me. It wasn't just a case where, since this C-Prime mission wouldn't carry a lunar module, NASA didn't want to throw away our training. Frank Borman and Bill Anders had been training on the lunar module too. I think it was that Rusty and I knew more about this particular lunar module than anyone else. So there was a certain logic to keeping us where we were. Over the years this story has grown to the point where people think I was offered the flight around the Moon but turned it down. Not quite. I believe that if I'd thrown myself on the floor and begged to fly the C-Prime mission, Deke would have let us have it. But it was never really offered.

Apollo 9, McDivitt's ten-day Earth orbital Lunar Module test mission, lifted off on March 3, 1969. Because there were two spacecraft, two names were required. McDivitt's crew called their Lunar Module "Spider" and the command module "Gumdrop". The crew's first major orbital task was to separate the CSM from the S-IVB upper stage, turn around and then dock with the LM, which was on the end of the S-IVB, after which the combined spacecraft separated from the rocket. Scott docked the CSM with the LM, and the probe-and-drogue docking assembly worked properly. After McDivitt and Schweickart inspected the tunnel connecting the CSM and LM, the assembled spacecraft separated from the S-IVB. The next task was to demonstrate that two docked spacecraft could be maneuvered with the one engine, the Service Propulsion System (SPS). This was also successfully accomplished. The S-IVB was then fired again to send it into solar orbit.

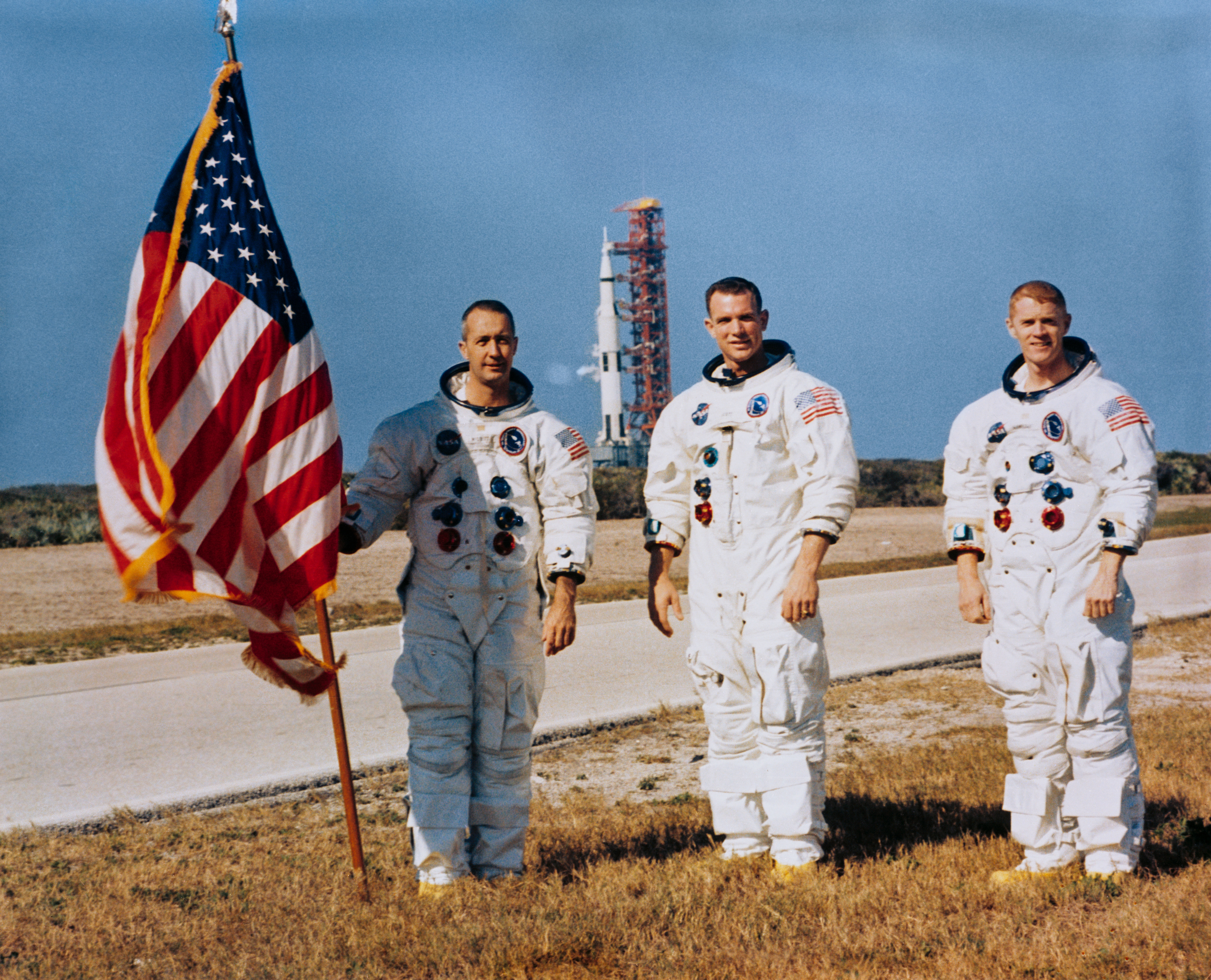
The Apollo 9 crew, McDivitt, Scott, Schweickart. Apollo 8 is on the launch pad behind them.

The next day McDivitt and Schweickart donned their space suits and entered the LM. This was the first time that astronauts had transferred from one spacecraft to another. They then tested the LM's propulsion systems. On the fourth day, Schweickart donned the Primary Life Support System, the backpack that astronauts would later wear on lunar surface EVAs, and exited the LM. At the same time, Scott opened the door of the CSM, and the two astronauts took pictures of each other. The next day, Scott undocked, and McDivitt flew the LM, putting the spacecraft's descent engine through its paces. As with the CSM, the crew quickly gained confidence in the reliability and performance of their spacecraft. Finally, he used the LM's ascent engine to dock with the CSM once again. After 10 days during which it had made 151 orbits, Apollo 9 splashed safely down in the Atlantic, where it was retrieved by USS Guadalcanal.

After Apollo 9, McDivitt became Manager of Lunar Landing Operations in May 1969, and led a team that planned the lunar exploration program and redesigned the spacecraft to accomplish this task. In August 1969, he became Manager of the Apollo Spacecraft Program. As such, he was the program manager for Apollo 12, 13, 14, 15 and 16 missions. He was promoted to the rank of brigadier general on February 17, 1972. When the selection of Gene Cernan to command the Apollo 17 mission was announced, McDivitt confronted Kraft over not being consulted about it, and threatened to resign unless Cernan was removed. Kraft consulted with Slayton, who gave a less than frank account of a January 1971 helicopter accident that Cernan had been involved in, not revealing that Cernan had confessed to flying the helicopter into the water. Kraft then informed McDivitt that Cernan's selection stood, and McDivitt resigned, although he stayed on until the end of the Apollo 16 mission.

== Post-NASA career ==
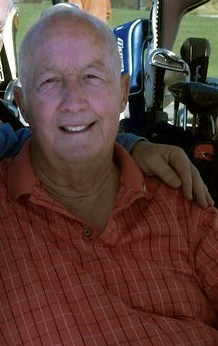
Jim McDivitt, February 2009

McDivitt retired from the USAF and left NASA in June 1972, to take the position of Executive Vice President, Corporate Affairs for Consumers Power Company. In March 1975, he joined Pullman, Inc. as Executive Vice President and a director. In October 1975 he became President of the Pullman Standard Division.

In January 1981 he joined Rockwell International where he was the Senior Vice President, Government Operations and International at the time of his retirement, Washington, D.C. He retired in 1995.

== Organizations ==
McDivitt was a member of the Society of Experimental Test Pilots, the American Institute of Aeronautics and Astronautics, Tau Beta Pi, Phi Kappa Phi, Atlantic Council on Foreign Diplomacy, and Advisory Council-University of Michigan. He was also a Knight of Columbus, and represented the Order at the Third World Congress for the Lay Apostolate at the Vatican in 1967.

== Awards and honors ==
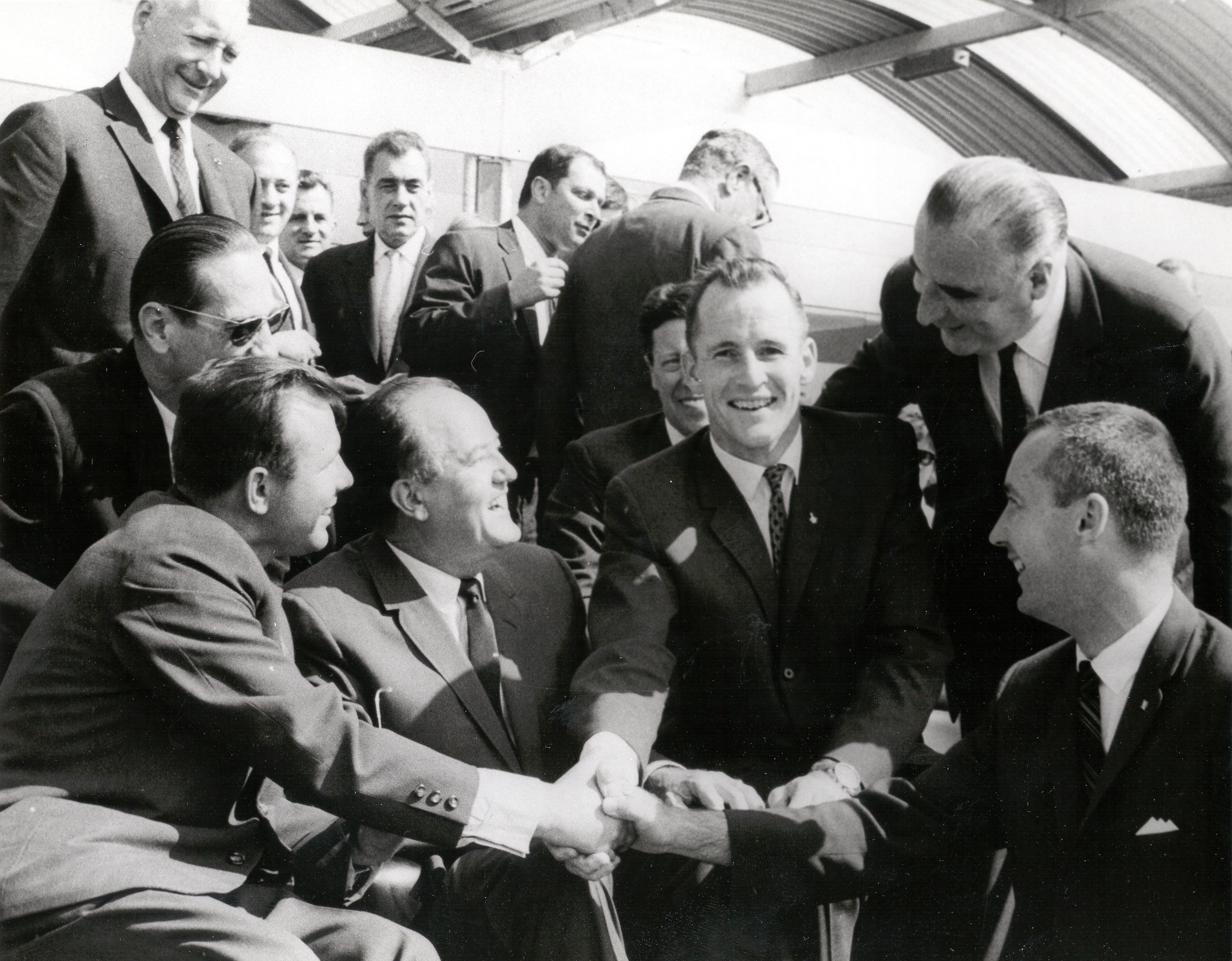
McDivitt (right) and White (3rd from right) shake hands with cosmonaut Yuri Gagarin, the first human in space, at the 1965 Paris Air Show.

- USAF Astronaut Badge
- Two NASA Distinguished Service Medals
- NASA Exceptional Service Medal
- Two Air Force Distinguished Service Medals
- Four Distinguished Flying Crosses
- Five Air Medals
- Order of Military Merit Chungmu Cordon, South Korea
- USAF Air Force Systems Command Aerospace Primus Award
- Arnold Air Society's John F. Kennedy Trophy
- Sword of Loyola
- Michigan Wolverine Frontiersman Award
- Golden Plate Award of the American Academy of Achievement in 1965
- The SETP Iven C. Kincheloe Award in 1969
- Inducted into the Aerospace Walk of Honor in 2009
- Inducted into the International Air & Space Hall of Fame in 2012
- Enshrined into the National Aviation Hall of Fame in 2014

McDivitt received honorary doctorate degrees in astronautical science by the University of Michigan in 1965, and honorary Doctor of Science degree from Seton Hall University in 1969, an Honorary Doctor of Science from Miami University (Ohio) in 1970, and an Honorary Doctor of Law degree from Eastern Michigan University in 1975. McDivitt was one of ten Gemini astronauts inducted into the International Space Hall of Fame in 1982. McDivitt, along with the other 12 Gemini astronauts, was inducted into the second U.S. Astronaut Hall of Fame class in 1993.

== In media ==
In the 1998 HBO miniseries From the Earth to the Moon McDivitt was played by Conor O'Farrell.

McDivitt appeared as himself on The Brady Bunch in a 1974 fifth-season episode about UFOs, "Out of This World", as a guest on a talk show to talk about his UFO experience. At the end of the talk show McDivitt signed autographs for the characters Peter Brady and Bobby Brady.

== Tributes ==
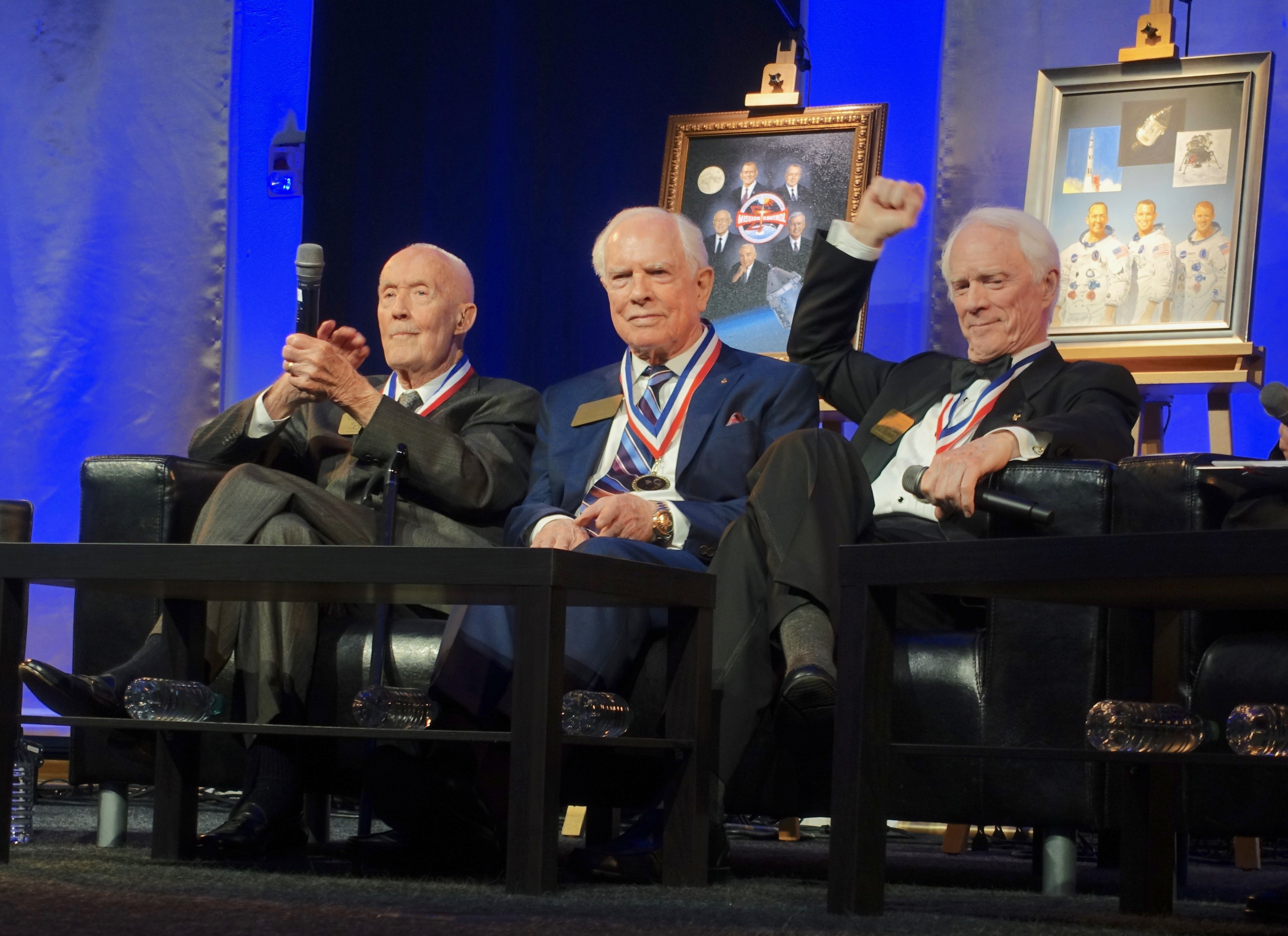
McDivitt, Scott and Schweickart on the 50th anniversary of Apollo 9 in March 2019

- McDivitt has a school named after him in Old Bridge, New Jersey, the James A. McDivitt Elementary School.
- He also has a building, James McDivitt Hall, named after him, on the campus of Jackson College, Jackson, Michigan, where the now closed Michigan Space Center was once housed.
- McDivitt-White Plaza is located outside West Hall at the University of Michigan.

== Personal life ==
McDivitt married Patricia Ann Haas in 1956. Together, they had four children: Michael, Ann Lynn, Patrick, and Kathleen. They later divorced. He subsequently married Judith Ann Odell in 1985. He gained two stepchildren from Odell's previous marriage. His recreational interests included hunting, fishing, golf, water sports, tennis, and all outdoor activities.

McDivitt died in his sleep on October 13, 2022, in Tucson, Arizona. He was 93 years old.
