= Ludwig Roth =

German-American aerospace engineer (1909-1967)

- Roth in 1960
- Born: June 10, 1909; Groß-Gerau, Germany
- Died: November 1, 1967 (aged 58); Redondo Beach, California, United States
- Spouse: Brunhilde 'Hilde'
- Children: 5 sons; Volker, Gerhard, Diether, Axel, Werner
- Scientific career
- Fields: Aerospace engineering
- Workplaces: 1937-1945: HVP/HAP; 1945-tbd: ABMA tbd-tbd: Douglas

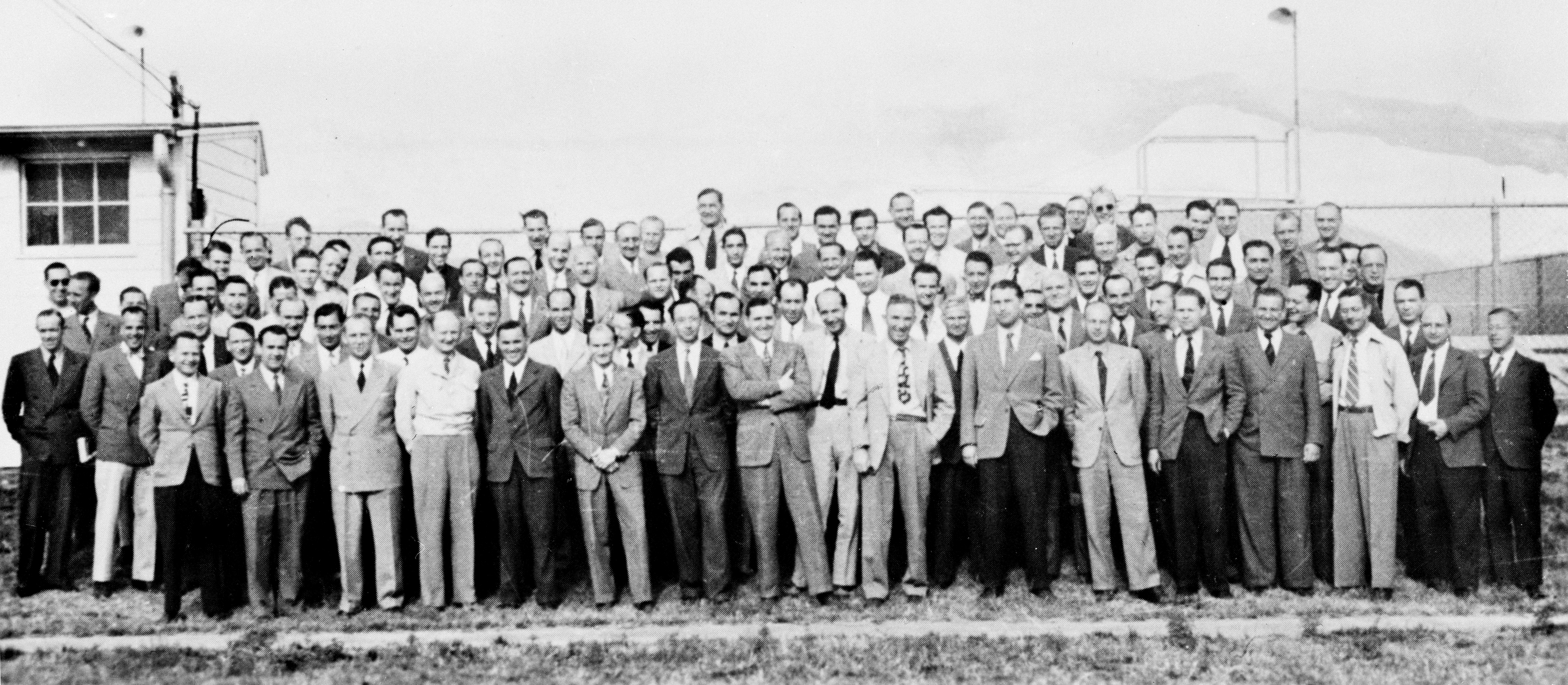
Operation Paperclip Team at Fort Bliss, Texas, August 1946. Ludwig Roth is in the first row (appr. center) (pointing the mouse will show the name)

Ludwig Roth (June 10, 1909 – November 1, 1967) was a German-American aerospace engineer who was the head of the Peenemünde Future Projects Office which designed the Wasserfall and created advanced rockets designs such as the A9/A10 ICBM.

Roth arrived in New York under Operation Paperclip on November 16, 1945, via the SS Argentina and served at Fort Bliss and Huntsville, Alabama. He and his family relocated to Palos Verdes, California. In Los Angeles, California he worked for Northrop Norair Division as Vice-President of Northrop Space Labs and then Douglas Aircraft as Director of SATURN/APOLLO Program Extensions. His son Axel Roth went on to work for NASA as an engineer, and ended his career as Associate Director of Marshall Space Flight Center. His son Volker worked for Boeing as Space Lab Design Manager. His grandson, Karl Roth, currently works at Marshall Space Flight Center (MSFC) supporting International Space Station, Lunar Gateway and Artemis Missions, working Payload Ground System Integration and NASA/MSFC Ground Segment between the European Space Agency and the Canadian Space Agency. His great granddaughter, Megan Roth, is an Engineer at Marshall Space Flight Center.

== Publications ==
- Roth, Ludwig (1967). THE ROLE OF THE S-IVB IN THE APOLLO AND POST APOLLO PROGRAMS. Douglas Paper no. 4396. Douglas Aircraft Corp.
- Roth, Ludwig; Shempp, W. M. (1967). S-IVB High Energy Upper Stage and Its Development. Douglas Paper no. 4040. Douglas Aircraft Corp.
- Lindberg, R.G.; Lombar, C.F.; Roth, L. (March 28, 1962). The Influence of Man on the Design of Spacecraft. NASA.
