= Charles J. Donlan =

American NASA researcher and manager

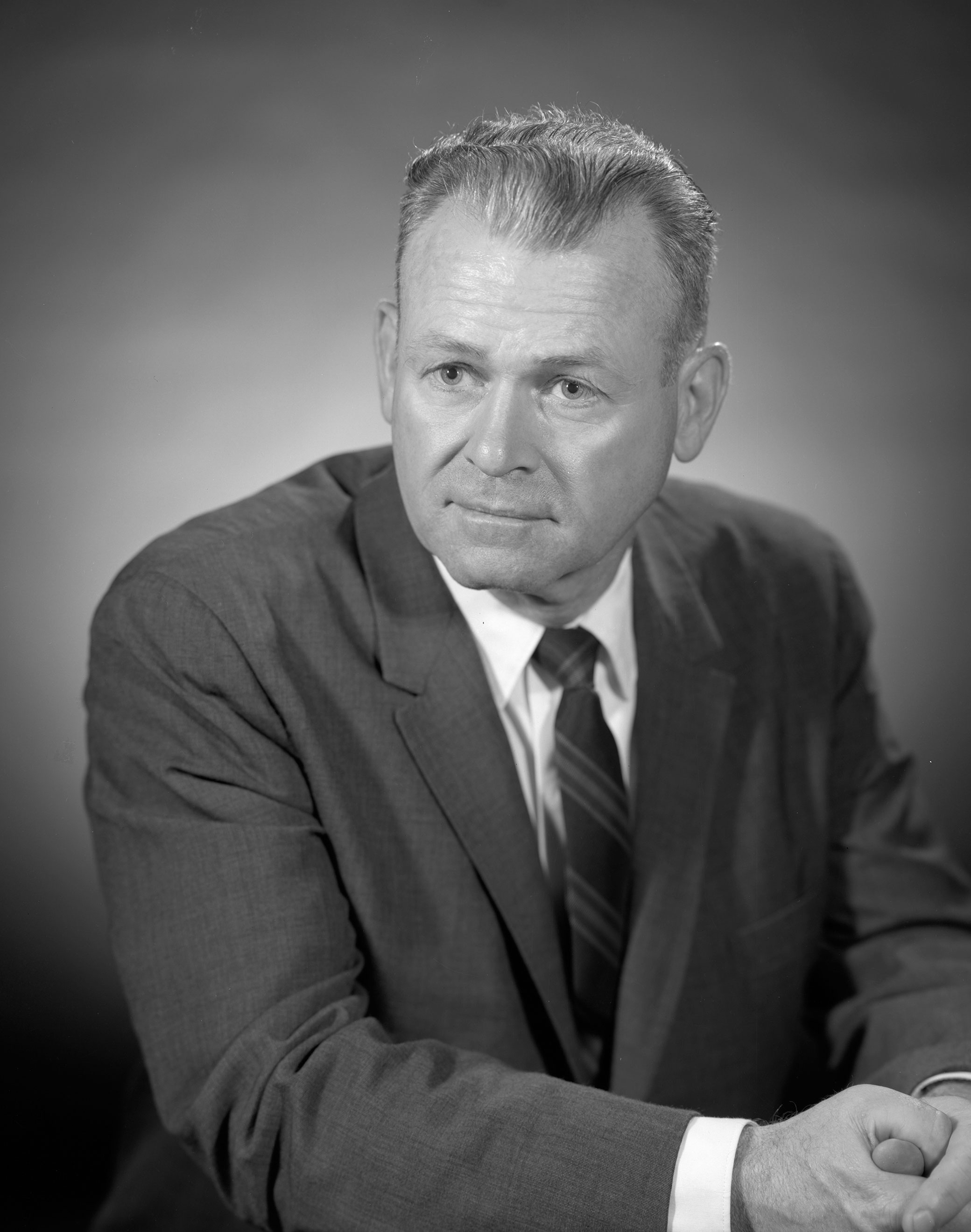
- Born: July 15, 1916; Lawrence, Massachusetts, U.S.
- Died: September 28, 2011 (aged 95); Williamsburg, Virginia, U.S.
- Education: Massachusetts Institute of Technology (BS, 1938)
- Occupation: aeronautical engineer
- Years active: 1938–1976
- Awards: NASA Distinguished Service Medal; NASA Exceptional Service Medal; NASA Outstanding Public Leadership Medal

Charles Joseph Donlan (July 15, 1916 – September 28, 2011) was an American NASA researcher and manager, who was involved in the development of its facilities and research techniques, and the formulation, implementation, and direction of technical programs in support of crewed and uncrewed space exploration.

== Early life and career ==
Donlan was born in Lawrence, Massachusetts, on July 15, 1916. He was educated at public schools in North Andover, Massachusetts, and earned a Bachelor of Science degree in aeronautical engineering, from Massachusetts Institute of Technology, in June 1938. He was offered a position at the National Advisory Committee for Aeronautics (NACA), the forerunner of the National Aeronautics and Space Administration (NASA), by John Victory, its Executive Secretary.

Donlan moved to Hampton, Virginia, and joined NACA's Langley Memorial Aeronautical Laboratory, where he worked for two years in the 15-foot (4.6 m) Free-Spinning Tunnel that had been designed by Charles H. Zimmerman. He then spent a year working with Robert T. Jones.

During World War II Donlan was involved in the design and operation of two new 7-by-10-foot (2.1 by 3.0 m) tunnels, and rose to become director of the facility from 1945 to 1952. He made contributions to the science and engineering of the swept wing, investigating and solving the pitch-up problems that affected the early swept-wing fighters, and developed a variable swept wing for the Bell X-1. He was also involved in the development of fighters such as the Vought F-8 Crusader.

Donlan represented Langley as a member of the NACA Research Airplane Panel, which oversaw the X-15 program. He also served as technical assistant to Langley's director, Floyd L. Thompson. When the Space Task Group (STG) was formed in 1958, Thompson asked Donlan to become its deputy head, under Robert R. Gilruth. Donlan was given the task of recruiting and training astronauts for Project Mercury, who became the Mercury Seven. He was also in charge of the STG team that evaluated the tenders for the Mercury spacecraft, which was awarded to McDonnell Aircraft.

In 1960, Donlan left the STG to become the Associate Director at Langley. He became Deputy Director in 1967. As such, he oversaw the Lunar Orbiter Project. On May 1, 1968, he became Deputy Associate Administrator for Manned Space Flight (Technical) at NASA Headquarters in Washington, D.C. From November 1970 to April 1973 he was the Director of the Space Shuttle Program. He retired from NASA in 1976, and became a consultant with the Institute for Defense Analyses.

== Later life and death ==
During his long career at NASA, Donlan received many honors and awards, including the NASA Outstanding Leadership Medal in 1963, the Special Award for Outstanding Leadership in 1968, the NASA Distinguished Service Medal in 1971, the NASA Exceptional Performance Award in 1976, and the NASA Exceptional Service Medal in 1976. He became a member of the Tau Beta Pi Association in 1938, and was a fellow of the American Institute for Aeronautics. He received the Randolph Lovelace II Award from the American Astronautical Society in 1976 and the Eugen Sanger Medal Award from the German Society for the Promotion of Aeronautics in 1977, and was awarded an honorary Doctor of Aeronautical Engineering from Ohio Northern University in 1972.

Donlan lived in Alexandria, Virginia, from 1968 to 1998, and then in Virginia Beach, Virginia, until 2005, when he moved to Patriots Colony in Williamsburg, Virginia. He died there on September 28, 2011. He was survived by his son Charles J. Donlan II. His wife predeceased him, as had his other son, Richard M. Donlan, who was killed in Bình Thuận province on February 28, 1969, during the Vietnam War.
