= T. J. O'Malley =

Irish-American aerospace engineer (1915–2009)

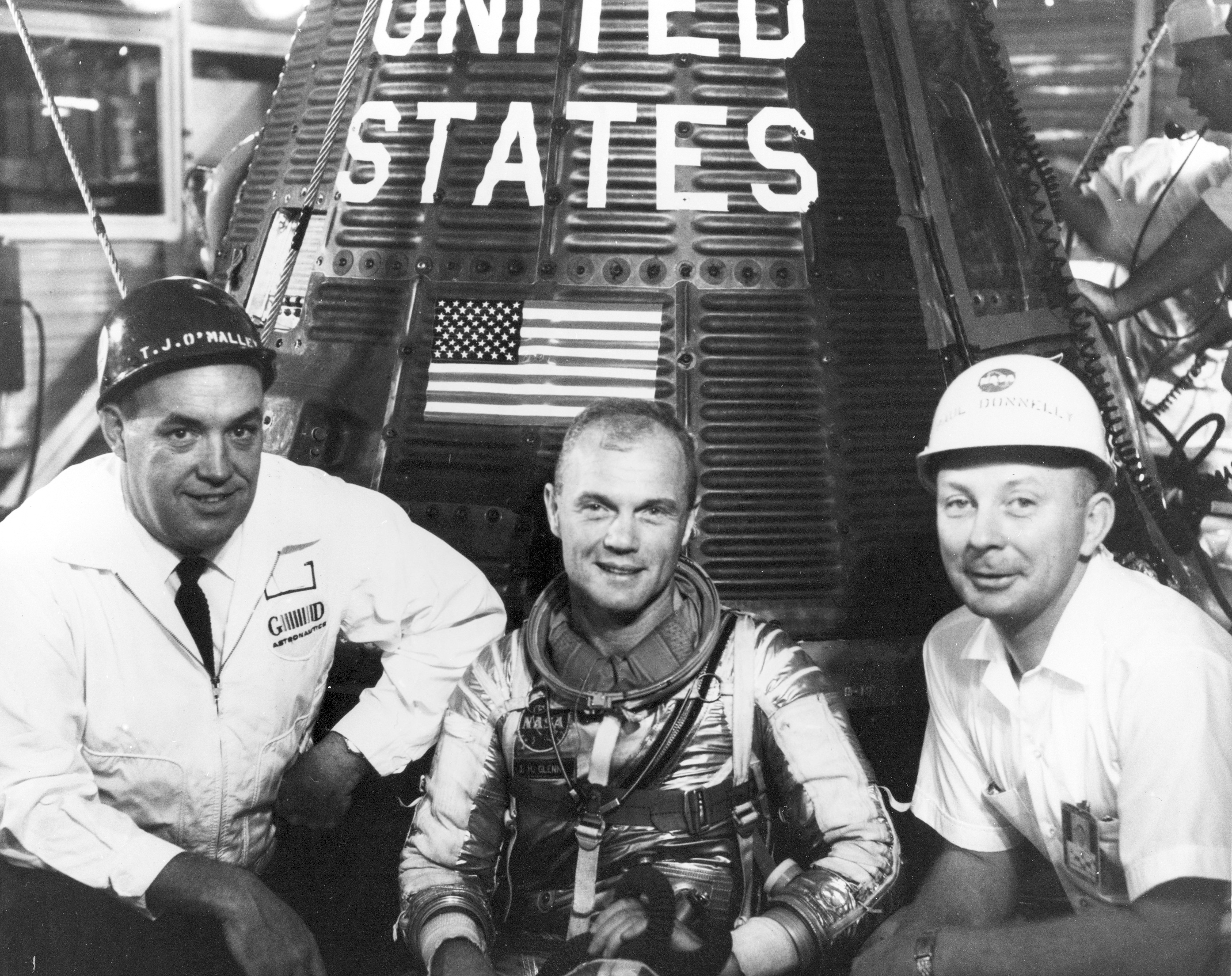
- O'Malley (left) with John Glenn and Paul Donnelly in front of Friendship 7
- Born: Thomas Joseph O'Malley; October 15, 1915; Montclair, New Jersey, U.S.
- Died: November 6, 2009 (aged 94); Cape Canaveral Hospital, Cocoa Beach, Florida, U.S.
- Education: Newark College of Engineering, B.S. 1936
- Occupation: aerospace engineer
- Spouse: Anne O'Malley

Thomas Joseph O'Malley (October 15, 1915 – November 6, 2009) was an Irish-American aerospace engineer who, as chief test conductor for the Convair division of General Dynamics, was responsible for pushing the button on February 20, 1962, launching the Mercury-Atlas 6 space flight carrying astronaut John Glenn, the first American in orbit. Five years later, NASA asked North American Aviation to hire him as director of launch operations to help get the Apollo program back on track after the Apollo 1 command module fire on the launch pad killed three astronauts. O'Malley continued to play a leadership role in the United States' space program through the first Space Shuttle launch in 1981.

== Biography ==
=== Early life ===
O'Malley was born in 1915 to parents who emigrated from Ireland to Montclair, New Jersey, and he lived there until 1944. In 1936 he earned a Bachelor of Science degree in mechanical engineering at the Newark College of Engineering (now the New Jersey Institute of Technology). Anne Arneth O’Malley became his wife in 1944, and they remained married for 65 years until his death.

=== Career ===
Wright Aeronautical in Paterson, New Jersey, the aircraft manufacturing division of Curtiss-Wright Corporation, was O'Malley's first aviation employer. In 1958, he joined General Dynamics and worked as a test engineer for their Convair division on the SM-65 Atlas intercontinental ballistic missile. In 1961, the Atlas was the only rocket in the United States' inventory with sufficient thrust to launch a crewed Mercury space capsule into orbit, and Convair was contracted to adapt it for this purpose. After two failed launches of the Atlas carrying an uncrewed Mercury capsule, O'Malley was given the task of preparing the Atlas for orbital spaceflight before the end of 1961, because the Soviet Union had already carried out crewed orbital missions that year. On September 13, 1961, five months after the last failed launch, the Atlas boosted an uncrewed Mercury capsule on an orbital flight.

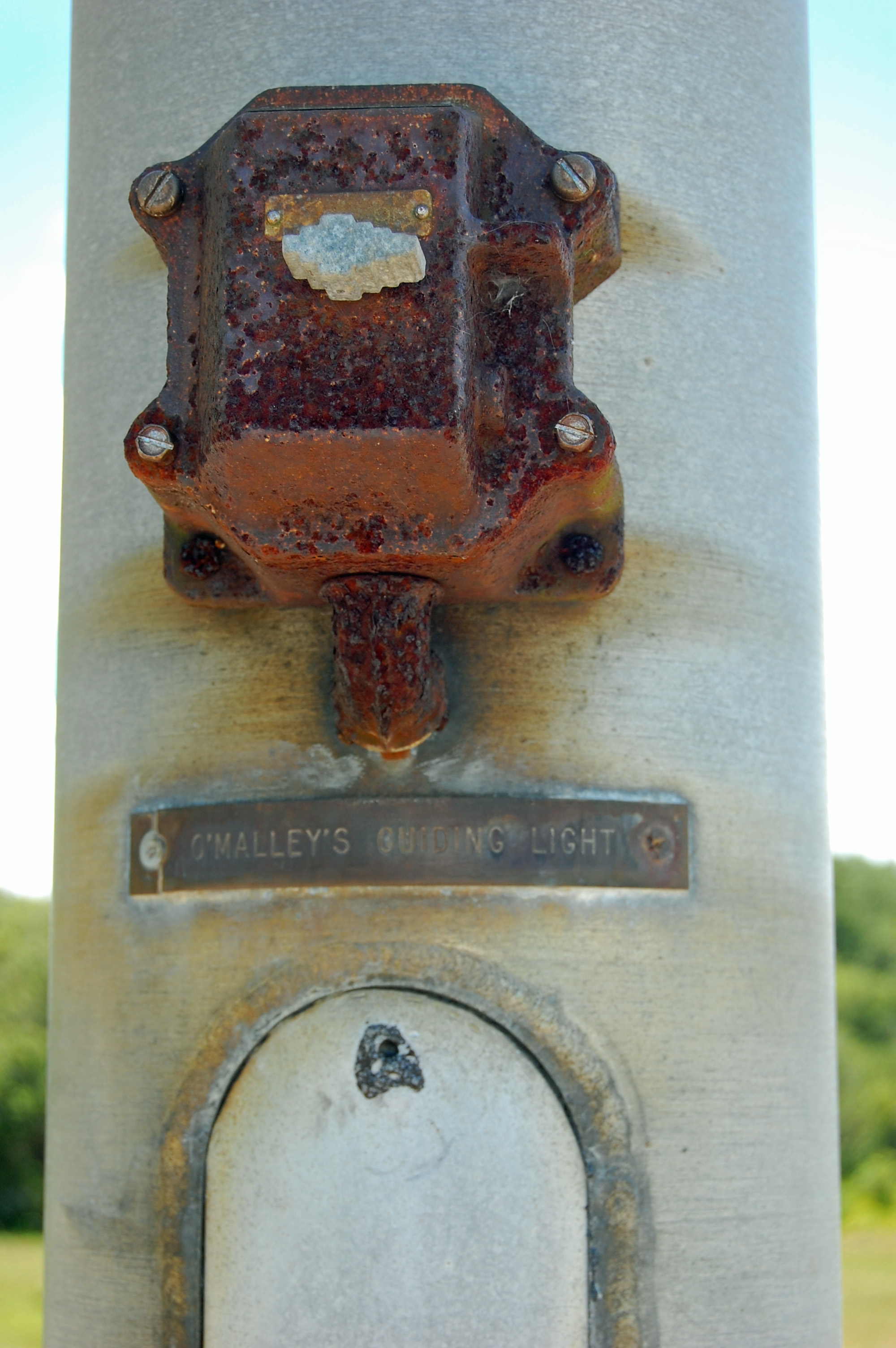
Switch to O'Malley's Guiding Light, built and left on for him at the entrance to LC-14

On the morning of February 20, 1962, O'Malley was directing the General Dynamics launch team from the windowless blockhouse just a few hundred yards from Pad 14 at Cape Canaveral where John Glenn sat atop the Atlas rocket in Friendship 7. O'Malley methodically worked through the checklist, finally announcing over the intercom, "T-minus 18 seconds and counting, engine start", as he pressed the black button on his console that began the firing sequence of the Atlas rocket. In response, his boss, astronautics base manager Byron MacNabb, seated in Mercury Control, said, "May the wee ones be with you, Thomas", a good luck reference to the leprechauns of Irish mythology. O'Malley made the Sign of the Cross, and said, "Good Lord ride all the way", just before backup astronaut Scott Carpenter, also seated in the blockhouse, made his iconic remark, "Godspeed, John Glenn!" As the countdown clock reached zero, the Mercury-Atlas rocket lifted off at 9:47 a.m. EST, carrying the first American astronaut into orbit. O'Malley had that black button mounted on a piece of varnished wood as a souvenir, which he continued to proudly display into retirement. On March 4, 1962, O'Malley appeared on the CBS-TV game show, What's My Line?.

During the Gemini program, O'Malley remained with General Dynamics working on the Atlas-Agena. O'Malley often went to work at Launch Complex 14 while it was still dark. The road along the launch pads had no street lights so O'Malley complained that it was hard to find the turn to Pad 14 in the dark. A streetlight was installed for him at the entrance to Pad 14, which illuminated continually until his death. It was named "O'Malley's Guiding Light".

A promotion to senior manager in the Electric Boat division took him away from the space program in 1966. On January 27, 1967, the Apollo 1 command module fire at Launch Complex 34 killed astronauts Gus Grissom, Ed White and Roger B. Chaffee. North American Aviation built the command module, and had to make organizational changes as well as design modifications as a result of the fatal accident. By May 1967, a new management team was taking shape, and Bastian "Buzz" Hello, who took over operations at then-Cape Kennedy for North American, hired O'Malley as director of command module launch operations.

=== Later years ===
In 1970, O’Malley became vice president and general manager of launch operations for North American Rockwell, where he was responsible for Rockwell's work on Skylab and the Apollo–Soyuz Test Project. He subsequently worked on the Space Shuttle program, leading up to its first launch in April 1981, a few months before his retirement.

O'Malley died of pneumonia in a Cocoa Beach, Florida, hospital on November 6, 2009, at the age of 94.

== Awards ==
- NASA Distinguished Public Service Medal, 1969, 1974
- NASA Public Service Group Achievement Award, 1973
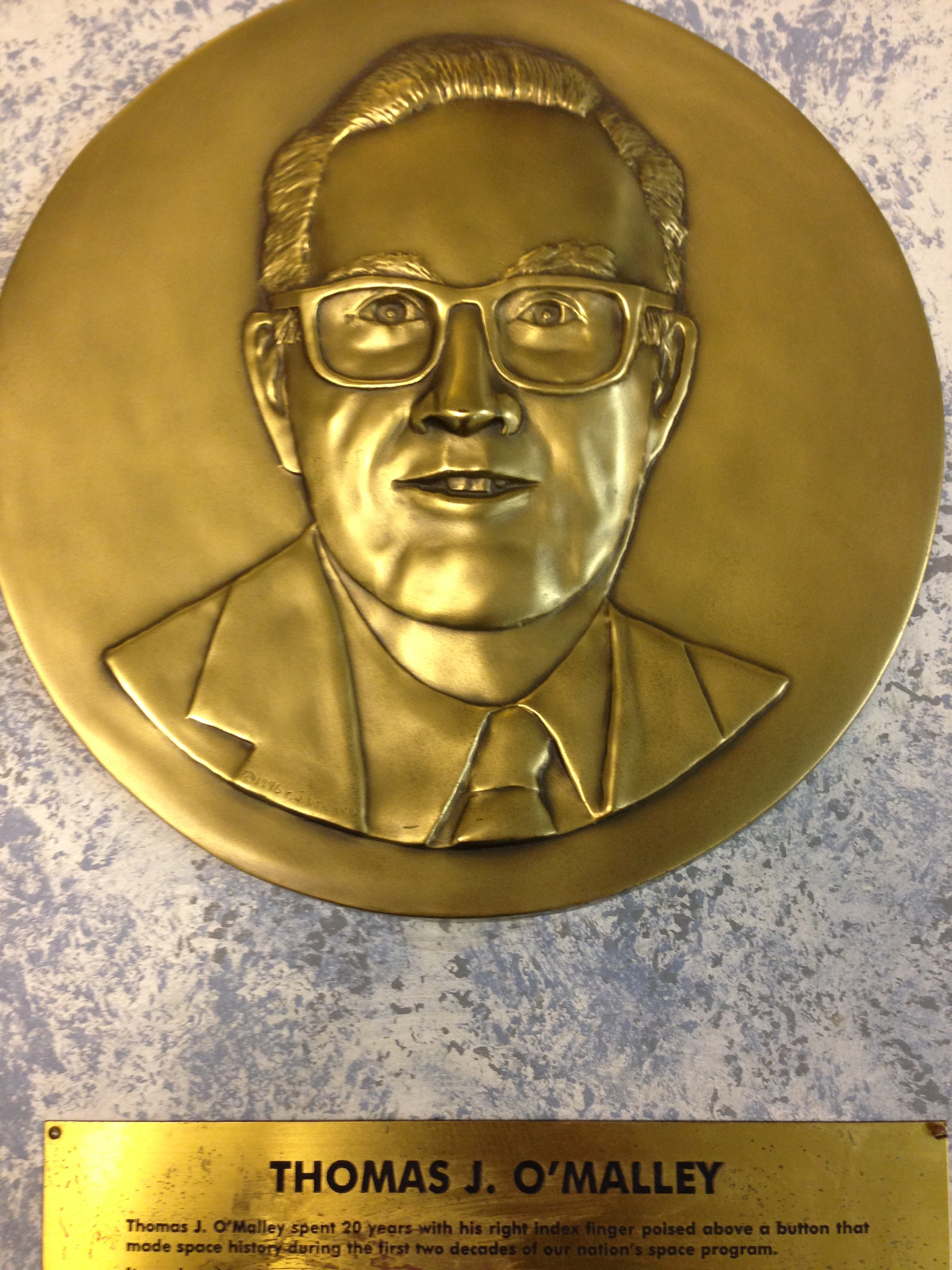
- New Jersey Aviation Hall of Fame Inductee, 1996

== In popular culture ==
The tape recording of O'Malley and Scott Carpenter from the John Glenn launch was used on "My Star", a track by British rock singer Ian Brown. The record made the UK Top 5 Singles Chart in January 1998.
