= James B. Odom =

American NASA engineer and program manager

- Born: 1933 or 1934 (age 92–93); Alabama
- Education: Auburn University (BS)
- Spouse: June Peevy
- Children: 2
- Awards: NASA Exceptional Service Medal, NASA Distinguished Service Medal, Presidential Rank of Meritorious Executive (twice)
- Scientific career
- Workplaces: Army Ballistic Missile Agency, Marshall Space Flight Center

James B. Odom (born 1933/1934) is an American aerospace engineer and NASA official. He served as director for several major programs at the Marshall Space Flight Center, including the Space Telescope and the Space Station. For his career, he was the recipient of NASA's Exceptional and Distinguished Service Medals.

== Biography ==
Odom was born in 1933 or 1934 in Alabama. He attended McKenzie High School, graduating in 1951, and later studied at Troy State College and Auburn University. In 1955 he graduated from Auburn with a BS in mechanical engineering. After graduating, Odom worked for the Chemstrand Corporation in Decatur, Alabama for six months before being drafted by the Army. After completing basic training, he was recommended to the Army Ballistic Missile Agency, where he joined the launching and handling lab as a systems engineer.

Odom transferred to the Marshall Space Flight Center in 1959, a year ahead of its formal establishment. His initial work at the center focused on the development of earth satellites and unmanned space probes. His first notable appointment was as chief of Engineering and Test Operations for the Saturn V launch vehicle's second stage. When NASA's Space Shuttle project began, Odom was first appointed manager of the External Tank Project in 1972 and then deputy manager for Production and Logistics in 1982. He also led the Shuttle's source evaluation board, picking the contractor for the external tank and helping to negotiate the contract. In 1983, Odom was appointed manager of the Space Telescope Office. In November 1986, he was appointed director of the MSFC's Science and Engineering Directorate. By March 1988, he had become head of the Space Station program, succeeding the program's former director Andrew J. Stofan.

In April 1989, Odom retired from NASA, citing new federal regulations that would have prevented later retirees from leaving government jobs to take similar jobs in the private sector. After retiring, he became CEO of Applied Research Inc. in Huntsville, Alabama. In 1994, he became a consultant to the Science Applications International Corporation.

== Awards and honors ==
Odom received several major awards during his time at NASA. In April 1973, he received the NASA Exceptional Service Medal for his work on the Saturn V. In September 1981, he received the NASA Distinguished Service Medal for his work on the Space Shuttle. Odom also received the Presidential Rank of Meritorious Executive twice, once for his management on the External Tank and once for his management on the Space Telescope.

In 2019, Odom was honored by the Decatur-Morgan County Chamber of Commerce as the county's Citizen of the Year. Odom is also the namesake of Auburn University's James B. and June Peevy Odom Endowed Scholarship, which is awarded to engineering students based on financial need.
