= Paul C. Donnelly =

American aerospace pioneer (1923–2014)

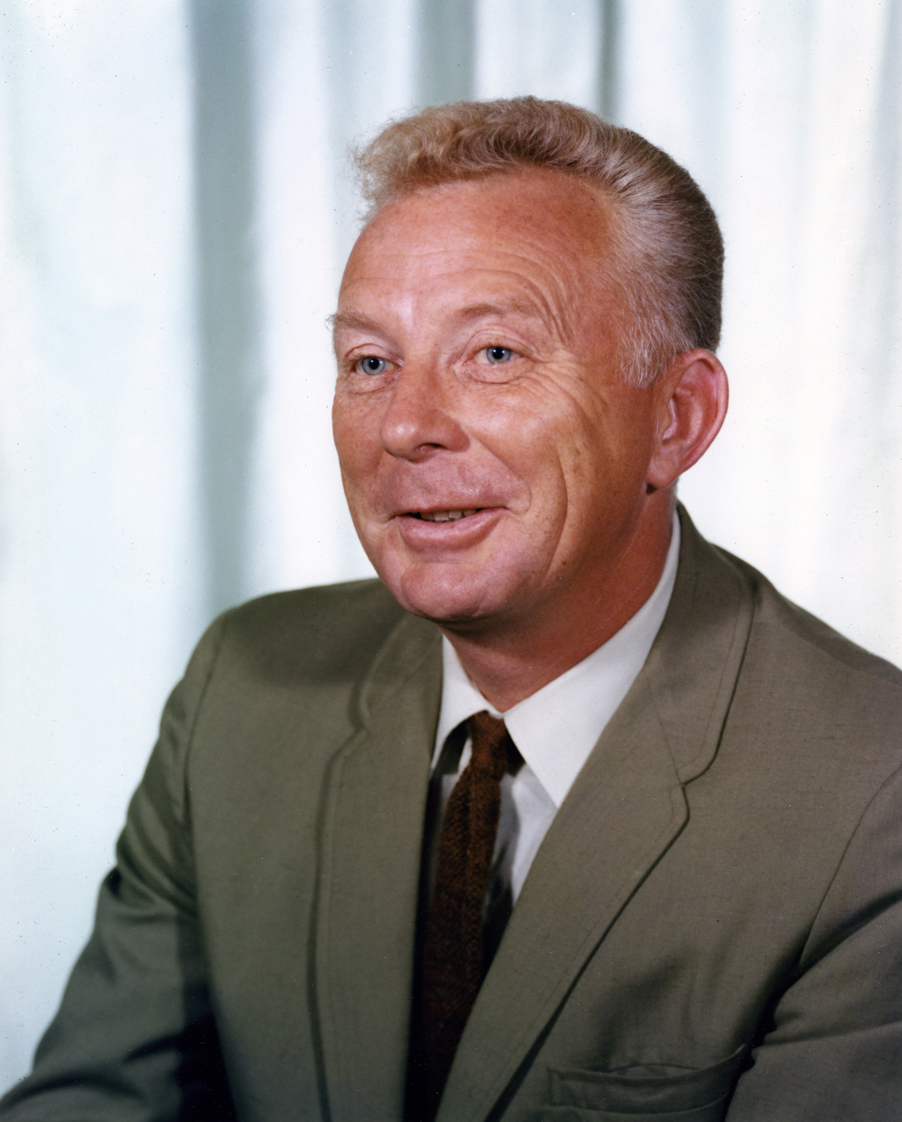
- Official NASA portrait, 1969
- Born: March 28, 1923; Altoona, Pennsylvania
- Died: March 12, 2014 (aged 90); Indian Harbour Beach, Florida
- Known for: Apollo launch operations management
- Awards: NASA Distinguished Service Medal (2); NASA Exceptional Achievement Medal (3); NASA Outstanding Leadership Medal
- Scientific career
- Fields: Guided missiles, electrical engineering
- Workplaces: 1942–45: National Hydraulic Lab 1946–58: Navy Bur. of Ordnance; 1958–64: LOD-Cape Canaveral; 1964–78: Kennedy Space Center 1978–89: United Space Boosters, Inc.

Paul Charles Donnelly (March 28, 1923 – March 12, 2014) was an American guided missile pioneer and a senior NASA manager during the Apollo Moon landing program at the Kennedy Space Center (KSC). Responsible for the checkout of all Apollo launch vehicles and spacecraft, he was also involved in every U.S. manned launch from Alan Shepard's Mercury suborbital flight in 1961 through the tenth Space Shuttle mission (STS-41B) in 1984.

During World War II, Donnelly helped develop the U.S. Navy's Bat, the first "smart bomb" in the history of warfare, which his Navy squadron dropped on Japanese ships in Borneo's Balikpapan Harbor in 1945.

== Biography ==
Donnelly was born March 28, 1923, in Altoona, Pennsylvania, the son of Irish immigrant David Roy Donnelly and Magdalena (née Schreiber) Donnelly, born in Germany. He graduated from Altoona High School in 1940 (and received its Distinguished Alumni Award in 2000). He left to join the Navy in 1942, and completed courses in electronics at Grove City College. He also attended the Navy's electronics and guided missile technical schools.

Nicknamed "Red" for his hair, Donnelly was stationed at the National Bureau of Standards in Washington, D.C., working in electronics for classified guided ordnance development, including the Bat, at the Navy's National Hydraulic Laboratory. On April 28, 1945, his VPB-109 Squadron of PB4Y-2 Privateer bombers, known as the Bat Squadron, dropped several SWOD-9 Bats, the first fully automatic (radar) guided bombs used in warfare, on Japanese shipping in Borneo's Balikpapan Harbor. The attack sank three ships and destroyed a large oil tank. Donnelly advanced to the rate of chief petty officer and was awarded nine Navy medals.

After the war, Donnelly became a Navy civil service employee. He was assigned to aircraft and ordnance testing at the Naval Air Ordnance Test Station at Chincoteague Island, Virginia and the Naval Air Station Patuxent River, Mayland, where he first met Alan Shepard, Pete Conrad, John Young, Jim Lovell and other future astronauts. In 1951, he was awarded an electronic engineer-equivalent degree by the U.S. Civil Service Commission.

=== NASA career ===
Donnelly had worked at the National Hydraulic Laboratory for Hugh L. Dryden, who became NASA deputy administrator in 1958. Dryden recommended Donnelly to Robert R. Gilruth, head of NASA's Space Task Group at Langley, Virginia, who hired him.

Gilruth sent Donnelly to Cape Canaveral, Florida, in 1959, where he served as a capsule (spacecraft) test conductor for all Project Mercury and Gemini launches. He became chief test conductor for the Manned Spacecraft Center's Florida Operations during the Gemini program, responsible for planning, scheduling and directing all crewed spacecraft pre-launch and launch acceptance tests. In 1964, he was named launch operations manager for KSC, with oversight of both spacecraft and launch vehicles; reporting to Rocco Petrone, KSC director of launch operations.

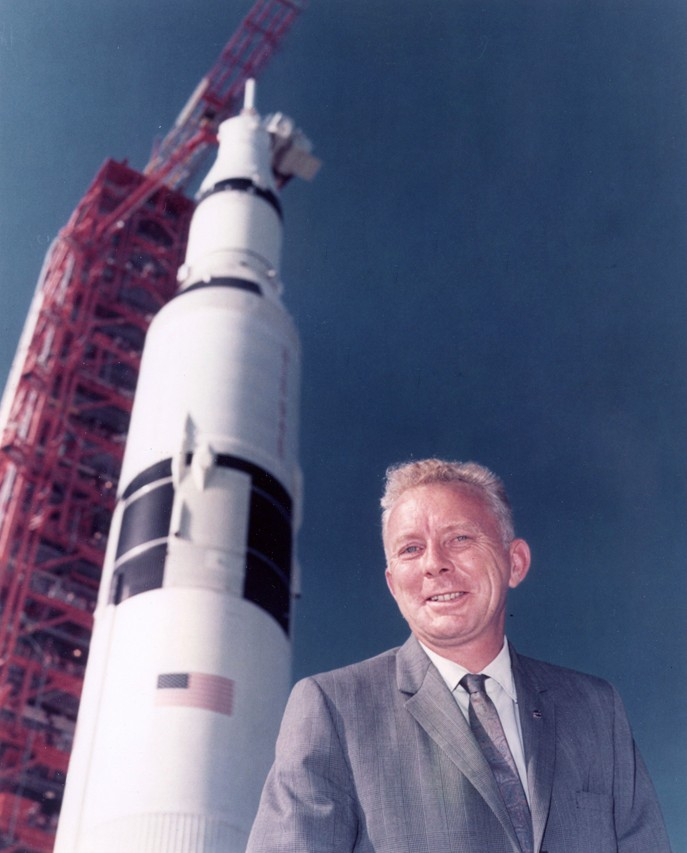
Donnelly at the Apollo 11 rollout at LC-39 on May 20, 1969

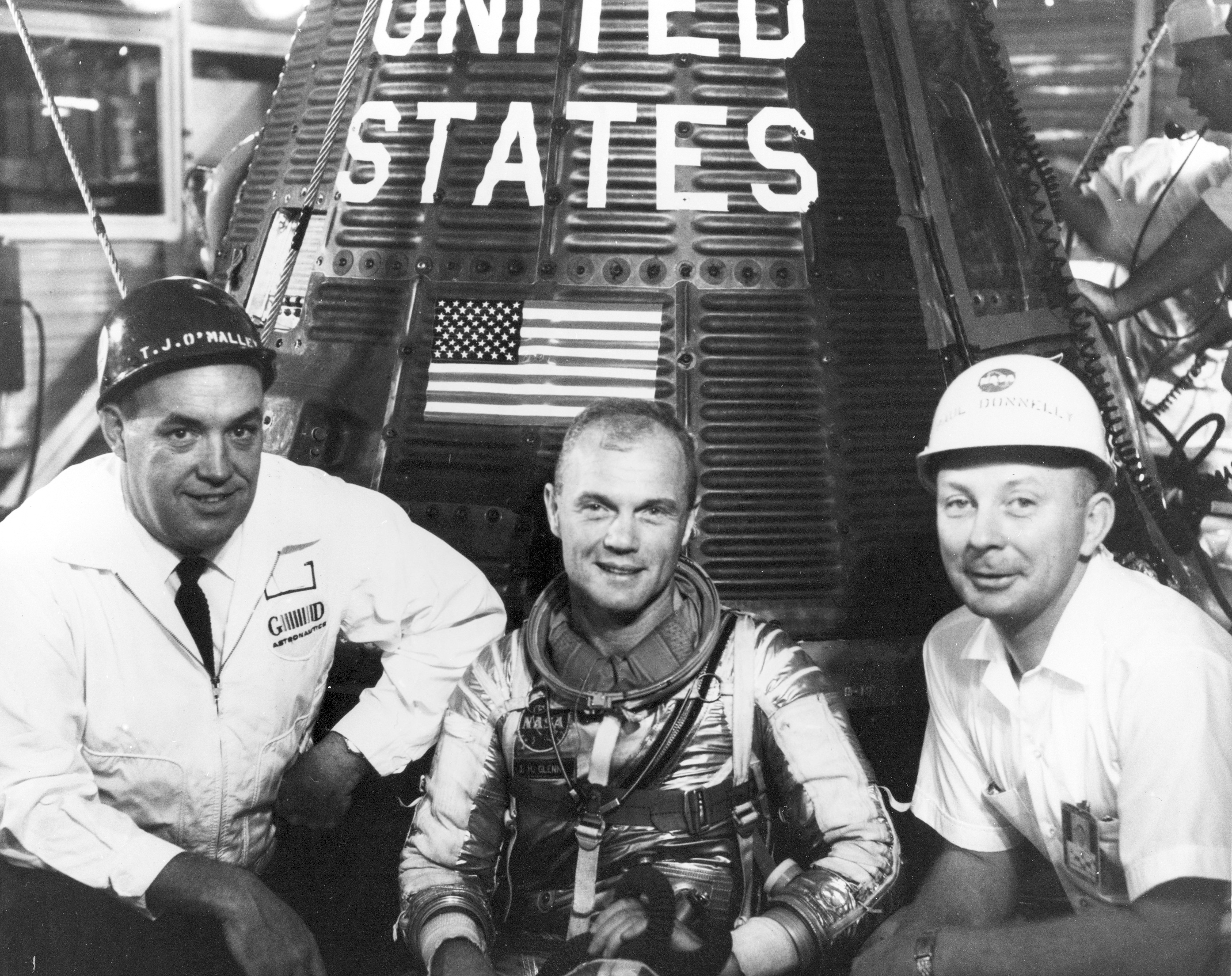
Donnelly (r) with John Glenn (c) and T.J. O'Malley in front of Friendship 7 in 1962.

Donnelly was the launch operations manager on January 27, 1967, when fire swept through the Apollo 1 command module, killing the crew; and served as an observer for the Apollo 204 Review Board's Advisory Group later that year.

As launch operations manager in KSC's Test Operations Office during Apollo, he was responsible for the checkout of all manned space vehicles, including boosters and spacecraft, from Apollo 7 in 1968 through the Apollo-Soyuz Test Project in 1975. By 1973, he became associate director, launch operations.

In 1976, Donnelly was project manager of Third Century America, a science and technology display at KSC commemorating the U.S. Bicentennial. In 1977, he led the NASA team conducting drop tests of the Space Shuttle Enterprise at the Dryden Flight Research Center, California.

=== Later years ===
In 1978, Donnelly retired from NASA as director, Space Transportation Systems Processing at KSC, and joined United Space Boosters, Inc. as vice president, Field Operations-Florida. The firm was prime contractor for Space Shuttle Solid Rocket Booster (SRB) assembly, integration, checkout and refurbishment; and for building two SRB recovery ships. He retired from USBI in 1989 at age 65.

Donnelly was a trustee and former four-term president of the Missile, Space and Range Pioneers, and a founder and two-term chairman of the board of the Astronauts Memorial Foundation. He received the Lifetime Achievement Award from the National Space Club.

Donnelly died on March 12, 2014, aged 90.

== Family ==
Donnelly married Margaret Mary Boyle in 1944, a nurse who once treated Arthur Godfrey. Their daughters are Penelope Martin, Pamela Gene McLeod (Vincent), and Paula Bleakley (McLeod). They had nine grandchildren, Michele Foster, Jackie Nuvy, Christopher Martin, Justin, Nick and Blaise Bleakley; Conor, Kevin and Michael McLeod; and four great-grandchildren, Austin Nuvy, Amber Nuvy, Cody Nuvy, Caden Martin. He had 12 brothers and sisters.

== NASA medals ==
Donnelly received six NASA medals, including two Distinguished Service Medals (1973, for his role in the Apollo program; and 1981, for STS-1), three Exceptional Achievement Medals (1969, for Apollo 8; 1969, for Apollo 11; and 1978, for shuttle Approach and Landing Tests), and an Outstanding Leadership Medal (1976, for Third Century America).

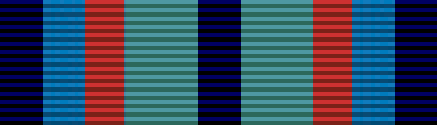
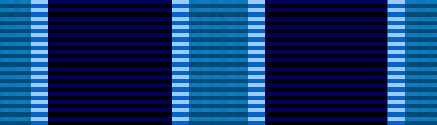

NASA Distinguished Service Medal with oak leaf cluster	NASA Exceptional Achievement Medal with two oak leaf clusters	NASA Outstanding Leadership Medal
