= Ernst Geissler =

German-American aerospace engineer

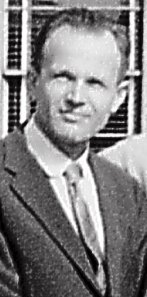
Ernst Geissler in Huntsville

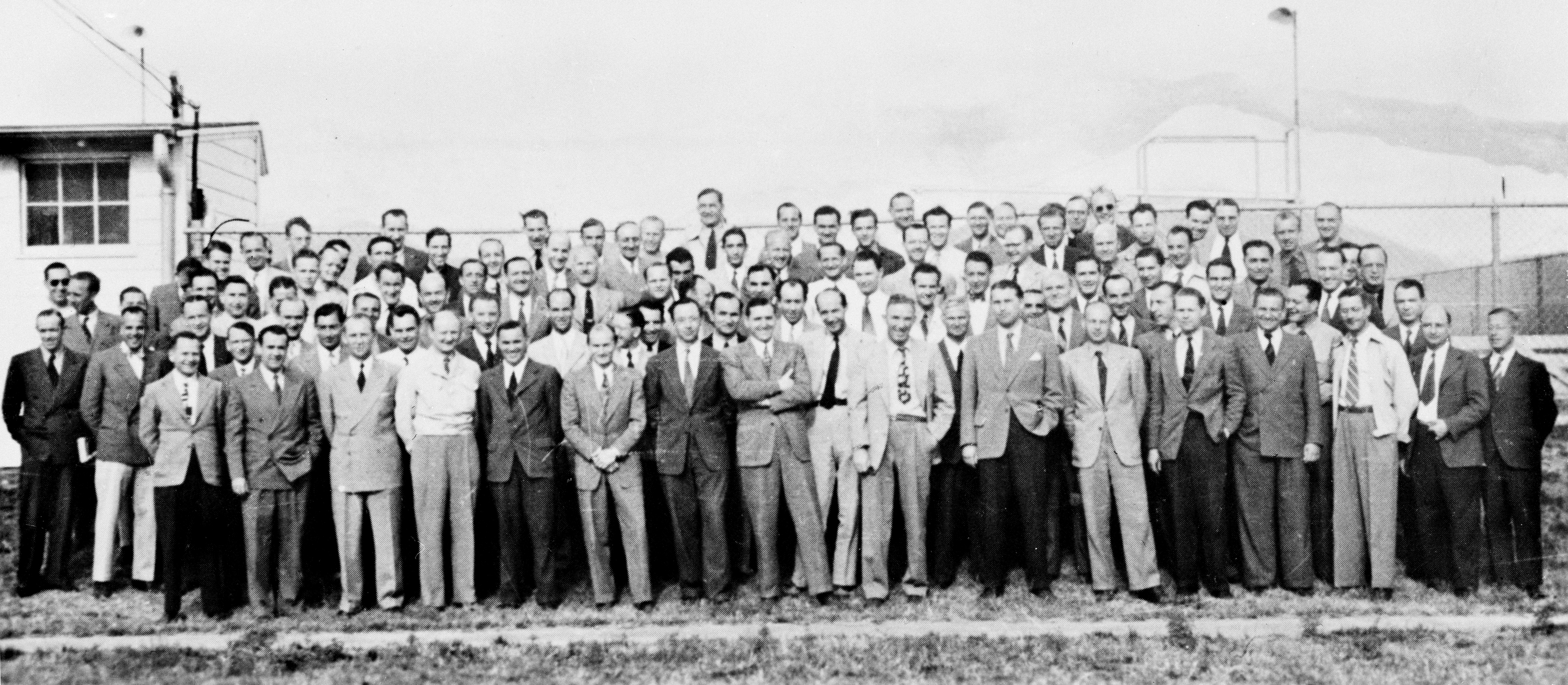
Operation Paperclip Team at Fort Bliss, Texas, August 1946. (pointing the mouse will show the name)

Ernst Geissler (3 August 1915 in Chemnitz, Saxony, Germany – 3 June 1989 in Huntsville, Alabama, United States) was a German-American aerospace engineer. After World War II, he went to the United States on 16 November 1945 as part of the Argentina group, Operation Paperclip.

Geissler became director of the Aeroballistics Division at NASA's Marshall Space Flight Center in 1960.

Geissler was the recipient of the NASA Certificate of Appreciation in 1973. He was awarded the 1973 NASA Distinguished Service Medal. He was elected a Fellow of the American Astronautical Society.
