= Axel Roth =

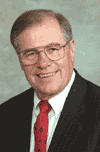
- Born: October 25, 1936; Darmstadt, Germany
- Died: November 12, 2008 (aged 72); Huntsville, Alabama, United States
- Resting place: Maple Hill Cemetery, Huntsville, Alabama
- Citizenship: United States
- Education: Auburn University
- Occupations: Structures Engineer, Skylab Payload Operations Director, Habitability Module Office Manager, Chief Engineer of the Spacelab Payload Integration, Deputy Manager of the Space Station Project Office, deputy director of Program Development, Associate Director of Marshall Space Flight Center
- Employer: NASA
- Spouse: Gloria Roth
- Children: 4

Axel Roth was born in Darmstadt, Germany, on October 25, 1936. He was the son of Ludwig Roth, an original member, of the German Rocket Team. He survived World War II, RAF bombing of rocket development facility at Peenemünde, Germany, August 17–18, 1943, known as Operation Crossbow. He arrived in the US in New York City, NY in 1946, a year after his father arrived there as part of Operation Paperclip, aboard a converted troop transport. He moved first to Ft. Bliss, Texas, and then to Huntsville, Alabama in 1950 when the German Rocket Team was relocated to Redstone Arsenal, Alabama.

Roth graduated from Huntsville High School in 1954 and graduated from Auburn University with a BS in Aerospace Engineering in 1959. Worked for Lockheed in Sunnyvale, California, from 1959 to 1960. Roth became a charter member of NASA's Marshall Space Flight Center, where he went to work in 1960. From 1960 to 1970 Roth worked as a structures engineer on the Saturn V/Apollo Program. He then worked for about three years on the Skylab program. From 1974 to 1981 he worked in MSFC's Spacelab Program Office, which led to him becoming payload operations director for the Spacelab-2 Mission. In 1987 he was named manager of the Habitability Module Office, and in 1989 he was named chief engineer of the Spacelab Payload Integration for the Payload Projects Office. Roth was named deputy manager of the Space Station Project Office in 1991, and in 1994 he became deputy director of Program Development. By 1995 he was the director of Program Development. He briefly assumed the position of acting manager in the Flight Projects Office in 1998, and in 1999 he was named director of the Flight Projects Directorate. In 2001 he assumed the position of associate director of NASA's George C. Marshall Space Flight Center.

Roth also served on the Auburn University School of Engineering Advisory Board from 2000 to 2007.

He died, November 12, 2008, at the age of 72, in Huntsville, Alabama, at his home after a long battle with cancer. He had four sons with his first wife, Anne Thomas—Karl, Eric, Peter and Kurt.

His son, Karl Roth, currently works at Marshall Space Flight Center (MSFC) supporting International Space Station, Lunar Gateway and Artemis Missions, working Payload Ground System Integration and NASA/MSFC Ground Segment between the European Space Agency and the Canadian Space Agency.

His granddaughter, Megan Roth, is an engineer at NASA-MSFC.

== Awards ==
Roth received numerous honors and awards during his 45 years at NASA. His special honors and awards include:

- NASA Distinguished Service Medal (2003)
- Presidential Rank Award (2000)
- NASA Medal for Exceptional Service (1996)
- Group Achievement Award (1975, 1995, 1996)
- Outstanding Performance Rating Award (1988, 1991, 1998)
- Sustained Superior Performance Award (1980, 1986–1991)
- Special Service Award (1984)
- Director's Commendation Award (1973)
