= Robert S. Kraemer =

American aerospace engineer

- Born: October 21, 1928; Fullerton, California
- Died: August 20, 2013 (aged 84); Catonsville, Maryland
- Education: California Institute of Technology (M.S.)
- Known for: Chief Engineer for Space Systems at Ford Motor Company's Aeronutronic Division; Director of Planetary Programs, NASA
- Awards: NASA Distinguished Service Medal (1977); NASA Outstanding Leadership Medal
- Scientific career
- Fields: Aerospace
- Workplaces: National Aeronautics and Space Administration - Science Mission Directorate - Planetary Science Division

Robert Samuel Kraemer (October 21, 1928 – August 20, 2013) was an American aerospace engineer who served as Director of Planetary Programs at the National Aeronautics and Space Administration from 1971 to 1976.

== Early life and education ==
Robert Kraemer was born in Fullerton, California, the son of a citrus rancher. He grew up in Placentia, California, and attended college at the University of Notre Dame where be received his B.S. in Aeronautical Engineering in 1950. He then moved back to California to earn a master's degree in Aerospace Engineering (Rocket Propulsion Option) from Caltech in 1951.

== Career ==
=== Rocketdyne ===
Robert Kraemer was hired by the rocket division of North American Aviation (later known as Rocketdyne) where he designed rocket engines. Kraemer served as the head of Advanced Design at Rocketdyne for over a decade, designing or overseeing the development of the engines that powered Jupiter, Thor, Atlas, and Saturn rockets.

=== Ford Aeronutronic ===
Kraemer left Rocketdyne to join The Aeronutronic Division of the Ford Motor Company (prime contractor for the Ranger series of lunar landers) in the Fall of 1961, where he was promoted to chief engineer for Space Systems.

=== NASA ===
Kraemer joined NASA in 1967 to manage the Voyager Mars Surface Laboratory, a program that was canceled within months of his arrival. He was then appointed as manager of Advanced Planetary Programs and Technology, and immediately began plans for a Mars orbiter. Beginning in 1969, he also chaired the Outer Planets Working Group (OPWG), which met monthly to review competing mission plans under development to explore the outer planets, and make recommendations.

In June 1970, Kraemer replaced Don Hearth as the Director of Planetary Programs, and was officially given the title in March 1971. In this capacity, he oversaw the development of the following exploration spacecraft:

- Mariner 8 - Intended to orbit and image Mars. Failed to enter Earth orbit after rocket tumbled out of control.
- Mariner 9 - Sister craft to Mariner 8, first spacecraft to successfully enter Mars orbit. Imaged 70% of the planet's surface.
- Pioneer 10 - First probe to pass through asteroid belt and to visit Jupiter.
- Pioneer 11 - Explored Jupiter, then was first spacecraft to visit Saturn.
- Mariner 10 - Flyby of Venus, first spacecraft to use "slingshot effect"; first spacecraft to explore Mercury.
- Helios 1 and Helios 2 - Investigated the interplanetary medium between the Earth's orbit and the Sun.
- Viking 1 - Orbiter and lander. First soft landing on Mars. Searched for evidence of life.
- Viking 2 - sister craft to Viking 1. Soft-landed in a different hemisphere from Viking 1.
- Voyager 1 - Visited Jupiter and Saturn with vastly improved instruments over Pioneer, First spacecraft to enter interstellar space.
- Voyager 2 - Explored all of the outer planets. First craft to visit Uranus and Neptune.
- Pioneer Venus 1 - First spacecraft to enter Venus orbit. Mapped entire surface topography with radar.
- Pioneer Venus 2 - Carried four scientific probes that were dropped into the Venusian atmosphere.

Kraemer was awarded the NASA Distinguished Service Medal, NASA's highest award.

Kraemer later served as Assistant Director of NASA's Goddard Space Flight Center. He retired in 1990.

== Publications ==
As well as various articles and reports, Kraemer authored two books:

- Beyond the Moon: A Golden Age of Planetary Exploration 1971-1978 (2000, Smithsonian Press, ISBN 1-5609-8954-8)
- Rocketdyne: Powering Humans into Space (2007, AIAA Press, ISBN 1-5634-7754-8)
