= Arnold Frutkin =

NASA official (1918–2020)

- Born: Arnold Wolfe Frutkin; November 30, 1918; New York City, New York, U.S.
- Died: September 1, 2020 (aged 101); Virginia, U.S.
- Title: Deputy Director of the U.S. National Committee; Associate administrator for external relations
- Term: 1957–1979

Arnold Wolfe Frutkin (November 30, 1918 – September 1, 2020) was the Deputy Director of the NASA international programs office between 1957 and 1978, and later, the associate administrator for external relations. He was the NASA Deputy Director for international affairs during the Space Race between the United States and the Soviet Union.

== Biography ==
Frutkin first started working for NASA when he was hired as deputy director for the U.S. National Committee during the International Geophysical Year, July 1, 1957, to December 31, 1958. This title later changed to assistant administrator for international affairs in 1963. Frutkin was employed by NASA as deputy director of the international programs office during the space race between the United States and the Soviet Union. After retiring, Frutkin commented although he had always disliked the space race, he had nonetheless felt disappointed by the success of Sputnik 1. In 1970, Frutkin and Thomas Paine held discussions with the Soviets that would later become the base for the ASTP.

Frutkin wrote a letter asking the French space program to reaffirm their pledge not to launch commercial communications satellites under the Intelsat project's agreement that no other communications satellites besides Intelsat would be launched for commercial purposes. France had requested that NASA launch a French satellite which they identified as a research instrument. NASA gave the project the go ahead, but later, some French officials started to claim that the satellite would be used for commercial purposes and the launch of the satellite was cancelled. Lebeau, an employee of the French space program, claimed that Frutkin had refused to launch the French satellite, a comment that resulted in Frutkin barring him from his office. Frutkin took a copy of the letter he wrote with him when he went to meetings in Europe, so as he could produce it when he was queried as to why he supposedly refused the French project.

Frutkin believed that the USA had never lost the Korean War as the aim of the USA had been to prevent North Korea from taking over South Korea, in which they had been successful. This opinion went against what many of his colleagues at the time, including Thomas Paine, believed. Nonetheless, in 1973, Frutkin was awarded the NASA Distinguished Service Medal by Thomas Paine, and Frutkin commented that Paine had always been "wonderful" to him.

In 1978 Frutkin was appointed as the associate administrator for external relations for NASA. He held this post until his retirement in 1979.

Frutkin died in September 2020 at the age of 101.
