= Ann McNair =

Ann Richardson McNair was the first woman flight engineering supervisor at NASA Marshall Space Flight Center. McNair worked at NASA for over 51 years and won many awards for her work.

She is not related to astronaut Ronald McNair.

== Early life ==
McNair grew up in Moundville Alabama. She earned her BS degree in math with a minor in physics in 1958 from the University of Alabama in Tuscaloosa, Alabama. She was a member of both Phi Beta Kappa and the Mortar Board Honor Society. McNair began her career at the Army Ballistic Missile Agency at the Redstone Arsenal in 1958. She moved to work at Marshall Space Flight Center in 1960 and worked there until her retirement in 2012. She married Lewis McNair during her time at the Restone Arsenal. In 1965, she disguised her pregnancy as a stomach virus for months out of concern that she wouldn't be allowed to work. She subsequently gave birth to daughter Celia.

== Career ==
During her time at Marshall Space Flight Center, McNair was named to be the first female engineering supervisor.

McNair worked as a mathematician for the Army Ballistic Missile Agency from 1958 to 1963. McNair worked in the Saturn program as deputy manager for the Orbital Analysis Branch where she developed flight trajectory studies and determined how long satellites might remain in orbit. Her work included the lifetime of satellites and comparison of onboard and ground tracking for lunar missions. She transferred to the rocket team with Wernher von Braun to NASA in 1960 as the Marshall Center grew. From 1965 to 1967, she worked on the Apollo program, concerning the planning and execution of Apollo flights. McNair then worked as chief of the Data Systems Integration Branch for space shuttle and Spacelab missions as well as Hubble. She became a deputy division chief in the Systems Analysis and Integration Lab in the late 1990s. From 1988 to 1990, McNair served as deputy chief of the Operations Development Division of the Systems Analysis and Integration Laboratory. She helped supervise the establishment and functionality of the US Payload Control Center and Training Complex.

McNair managed the Ground Systems Department from 2000 to 2004, and oversaw the establishment of the Chandra Operations Control Center to monitor the Chandra X-ray Observatory.

Her team aimed to ensure that the International Space Station segments were designed and configured to support the long term science goals of the ISS. The Marshall Center was known for world class test engineering and analysis; McNair's team strove to uphold that excellence and demonstrate the value of the space mission. Her work resulted in the development of the Payload Operations Integration Center.

McNair managed the Mission Operations Laboratory, a division of Marshall's Engineering Directorate, from 2004 to 2006. There she directed the Payload Operations Integration Center for the ISS. In addition, she managed the ground support facilities at the Huntsville Operations Support Center.

In September, 2006, McNair was named acting director of the Office of Center Operations. In 2007, McNair was named director of the Office of Center Operations at the Marshall Space Flight Center.

McNair advocated for LGBTQ NASA employees and worked toward a more environmentally friendly and sustainable workplaces.

McNair retired from NASA in January, 2012.

Lisa Watson-Morgan, NASA's human landing system's program manager and Audrey Robinson, Chief Counsel at Marshall, lists Ann McNair as woman who inspired and influenced each of them.

== Awards and honors ==
The University of Alabama, Huntsville, established the Ann McNair Endowed Scholarship to recognize and celebrate students who embody social advocacy, leadership and excellence in STEM careers.

Team Redstone Women's History Award

1973 and 1989 McNair was awarded the NASA Exceptional Service Medal

1998 NASA Exceptional Achievement Medal for her work on Chandra Operations Control Center

2007 - NASA Outstanding Leadership Medal

2009 - Presidential Rank Award for Meritorious Executives, the highest honor for a Federal employee

2009 - Commended by the Alabama State Senate for outstanding professional achievement

2011-Technology Award for Women Honoring Women

2012 - NASA Distinguished Service Medal
