= Richard W. Cook =

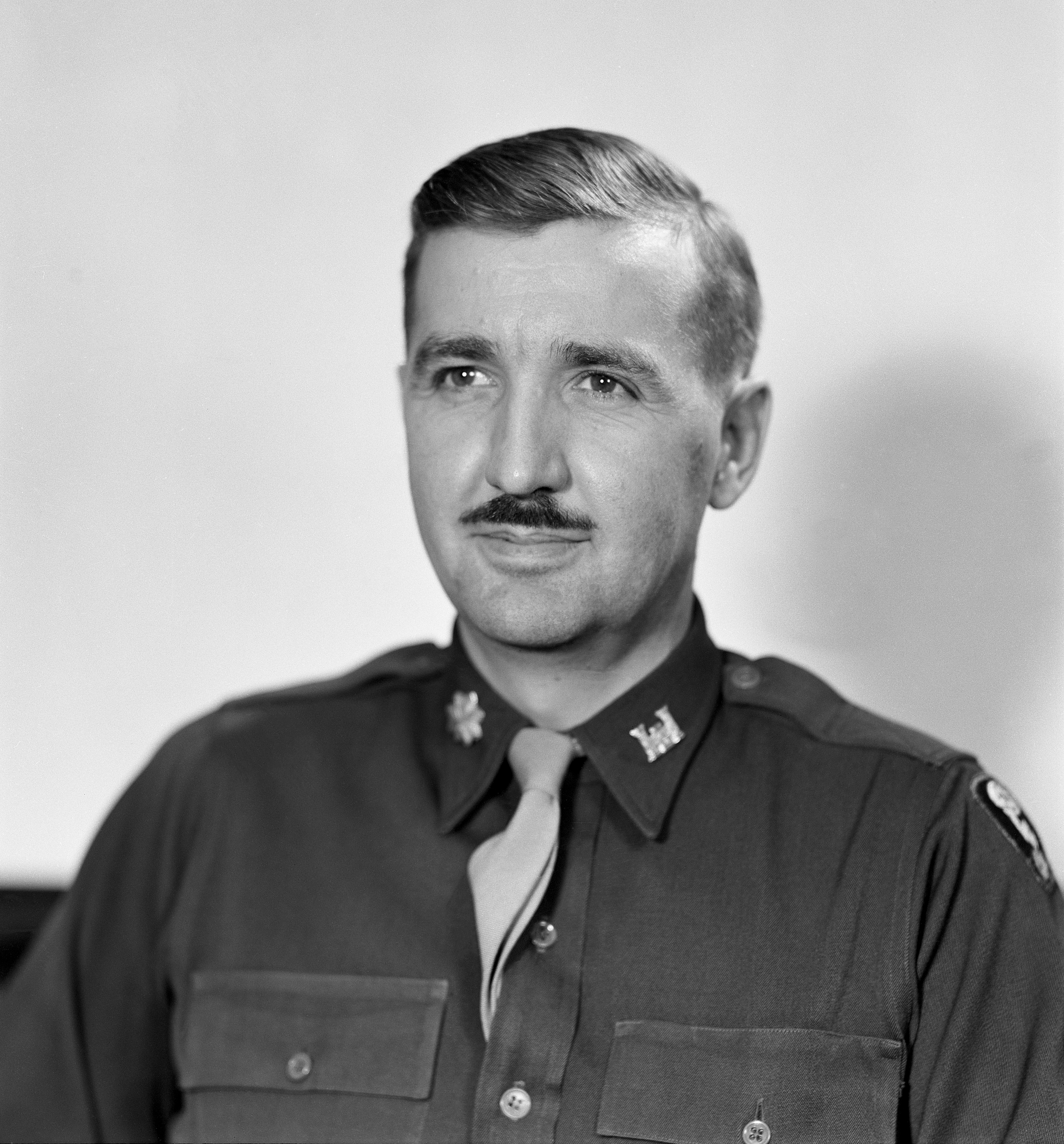
Cook in 1945

Richard W. Cook (August 8, 1907 – October 26, 1992) was born in Muskegon, Michigan. From 1927 to 1933, he attended Michigan State University and graduated with a bachelor's degree in civil engineering.

In 1940 he was ordered to active duty in the U.S. Army as a First Lieutenant and from 1940 to 1942 served as Assistant Quartermaster and Quartermaster for the Construction Division of the Quartermaster Corps. From 1942 to 1944 he was area engineer for Corps of Engineers, Washington Engineer District.

Cook was involved with U.S. atomic energy. From 1944 to 1947, Cook was Assistant to District Engineer and K-25 Operations Officer, Corps of Engineers, Manhattan Engineer District, Oak Ridge, Tennessee, and from 1947 to 1951 he was Deputy Manager and General Manager of Oak Ridge Operations, U.S. Atomic Energy Commission (AEC). In the fall of 1945, while still at Oak Ridge, Lt. Col. Richard W. Cook was awarded the Legion of Merit for his work on the A-Bomb Project.

From 1951 to 1958 he was employed at AEC headquarters in Washington, D.C. He was made Director of Production and in 1954 promoted to Deputy General Manager of the AEC.

From 1958 to 1973 Cook was employed as an executive at American Machine and Foundry Company and at the Marshall Space Flight Center. He was employed at AMF while it was producing components for the Atlas and Titan missile systems and he was at Marshall Space Flight Center during the height of the Apollo Program.
