= Richard G. Smith (engineer) =

American engineer (1929–2019)

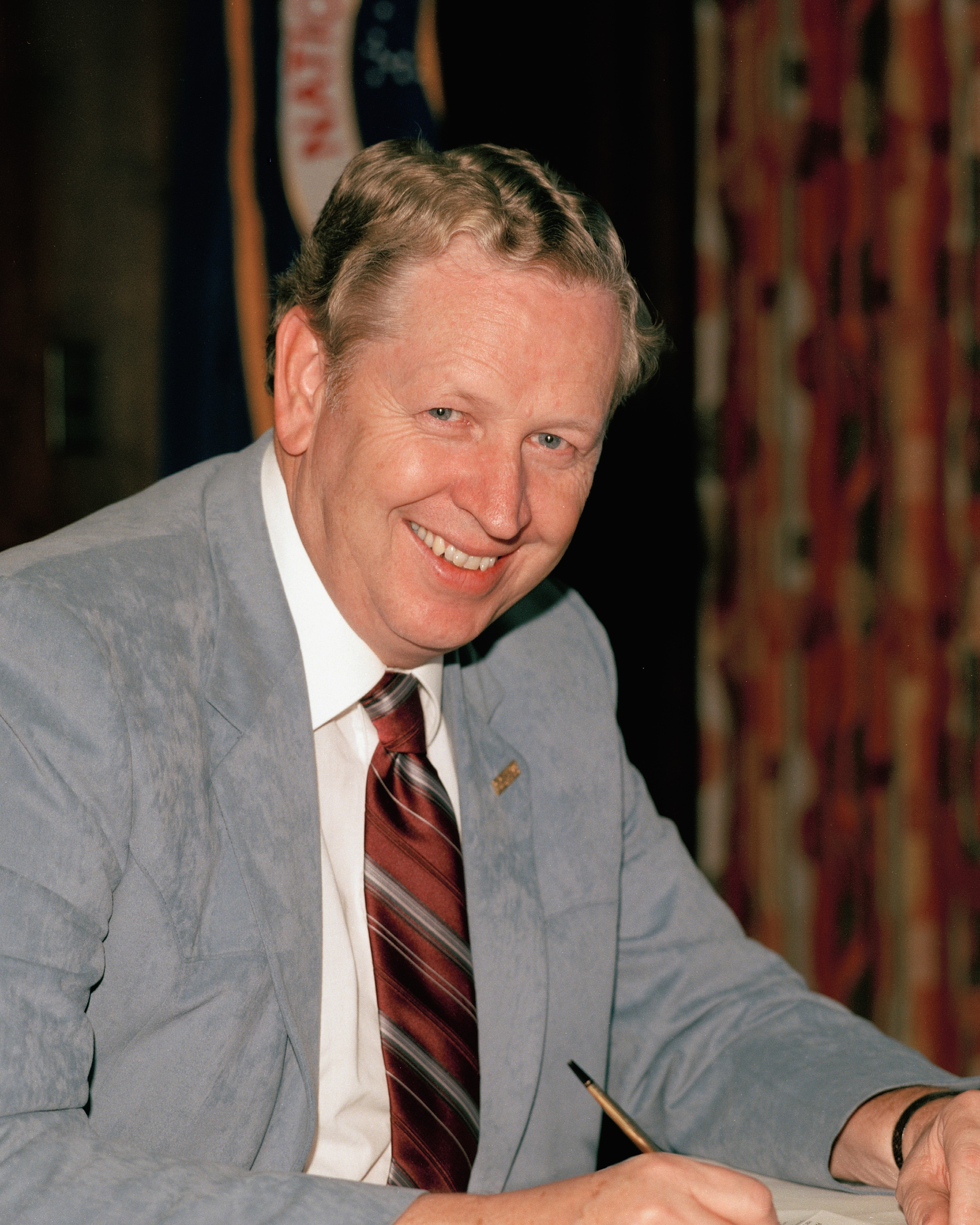
- Born: October 22, 1929
- Died: March 14, 2019 (aged 89)
- Known for: director of Kennedy Space Center

Richard G. Smith (October 22, 1929 – March 14, 2019) was director of NASA's John F. Kennedy Space Center from September 26, 1979, to August 2, 1986. Born in Durham, N.C., in 1929, Smith was educated in Alabama schools. After graduation from Decatur High School, he attended Florence State College and Auburn University. He received a bachelor's degree in electrical engineering from Auburn in 1951.

Smith became a member of the rocket research and development team at Redstone Arsenal, Alabama, in June 1951. He transferred to NASA in July 1960 when the Development Operations Division of the Army Ballistic Missile Agency became the nucleus for the establishment of the George C. Marshall Space Flight Center.

Smith served in positions of increasing responsibility at the Marshall Center. He held various assignments in the former Guidance and Control Laboratory and in the Systems Engineering Office prior to being appointed deputy manager and later manager of the Saturn Program. In January 1974 Smith became director of science and engineering and served in that position until he was named deputy director of the Marshall Center in 1974.

On August 15, 1978, Smith accepted a one-year assignment as deputy associate administrator for Space Transportation Systems at NASA Headquarters, Washington, D.C. He served as director of the Skylab Task Force appointed by the NASA administrator to represent NASA preceding and following the reentry of Skylab.

Smith was a member of the NASA Executive Development Education Panel, and he also served a three-year term as a member of the Auburn Alumni Engineering Council.

For his contributions to the Apollo Lunar Landing Program and the Skylab Program he received the NASA Medal for Exceptional Service in 1969 and the NASA Medal for Distinguished Service in 1973. In January 1980 he received NASA's Outstanding Leadership Medal for his management of the Skylab Reentry Program. In September 1980 he was awarded the rank of meritorious executive in the Senior Executive Service. In June 1981, he was awarded an honorary doctorate of science degree by Florida Institute of Technology. He was also awarded an honorary doctorate of science degree by his alma mater, Auburn University, on December 9, 1983.

Smith's administration covered the completion of the Space Shuttle buildup, the launch of 25 shuttle missions and the beginning of the planning effort for the original Space Station Freedom. Smith retired on Aug. 2, 1986.
