= Kenneth S. Kleinknecht =

American engineer

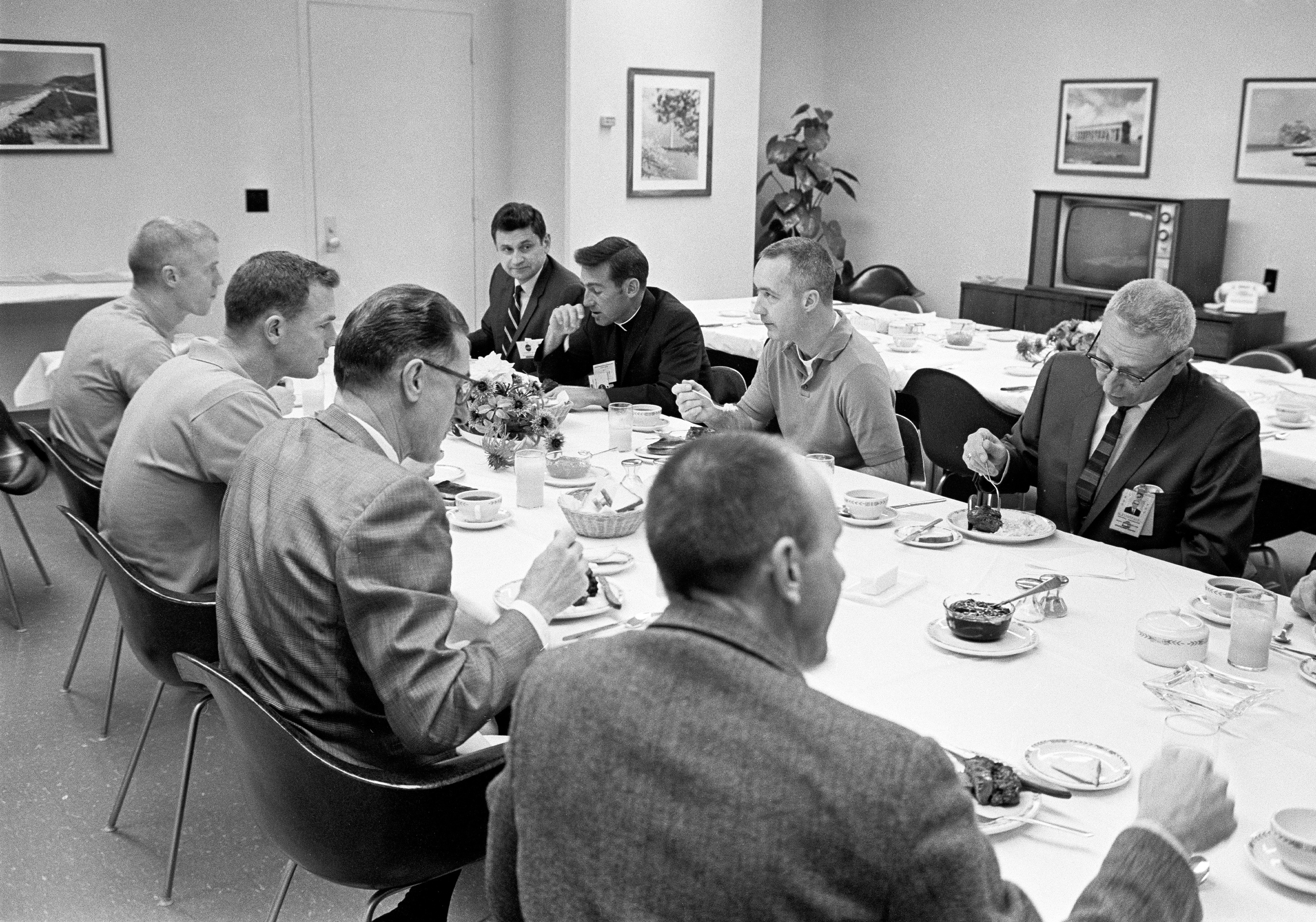
Kenneth Samuel Kleinknecht with some Apollo 9 astronauts, and other people that were involved in the Apollo 9 mission.

Kenneth Samuel Kleinknecht (July 24, 1919 in Washington, D.C. – November 20, 2007) worked for the United States National Advisory Committee on Aeronautics as an engineer and continued at NASA to become a manager of the Mercury, Gemini, Apollo CSM, Skylab, Shuttle, and Spacelab. After retiring from NASA, he worked for Lockheed Martin for 9 years.
