= Tecwyn Roberts =

American spaceflight engineer

- Tecwyn Roberts c.1974
- Born: 10 October 1925; Liverpool, England
- Died: 27 December 1988 (aged 63); Crownsville, Maryland, U.S.
- Occupation: aerospace engineer
- Spouse: Doris Sprake
- Children: 1

Tecwyn Roberts (10 October 1925 – 27 December 1988) was a Welsh spaceflight engineer who in the 1960s played important roles in designing the Mission Control Center at NASA's Johnson Space Center in Houston, Texas and creating NASA's worldwide tracking and communications network.

Roberts served as NASA's first Flight Dynamics Officer with Project Mercury that put the first American into space. He later joined NASA's Goddard Space Flight Center where he served as Director and Manager of the Goddard Space Flight Center's global tracking and communications system supporting NASA's manned and unmanned low earth orbiting flight programs.

== Early years ==
Roberts, alternately nicknamed "Tec" and "Tex", was born 10 October 1925 in Liverpool to William and Grace Roberts, from Anglesey. He lost his father c. 1936 and he moved with his mother to live with her parents in Rhos-y-bol, Anglesey. His name appears in the school log-book several times during 1936 and 1937 as he and his mother moved back and forth between Rhos-y-bol and Liverpool. While at Liverpool he attended Girton House School, Shiel Rd. The family settled on Anglesey and the records show that he successfully sat his Scholarship Exam in Ysgol Parc y Bont, Llanddaniel Fab in July 1938. At the time he lived with his mother and step-father at Trefnant Bach cottage. He continued his studies at the Beaumaris Grammar School, from which he graduated in 1942. After leaving Beaumaris Grammar School, he began an engineering apprenticeship with the aero- and marine-engineering company Saunders-Roe at Fryars Bay, Llanfaes, Anglesey, some eight miles (13 km) from Llanddaniel Fab. He is known to have returned to Anglesey at least once in July 1970.

== Aerospace career ==
=== United Kingdom ===
After serving briefly in the Royal Air Force (RAF), Roberts was released in 1944 and resumed work with Saunders-Roe at their Southampton works, from where he was transferred to the Isle of Wight in 1946. At that time, he also attended the University of Southampton where he obtained a degree in Aeronautical Engineering in 1948 and was awarded the Institute of Mechanical Engineers Special Award. Whilst working for Saunders-Roe on the Isle of Wight, Roberts met Doris Sprake whom he later married.

=== Canada ===
In December 1952, Roberts and his wife left England for Canada to take up a position with the aircraft manufacturing company Avro Canada near Toronto. From 1952 to 1959, he was a member of the engineering team that developed the CF-105 Arrow, a highly advanced delta-winged interceptor aircraft. When the Avro Arrow project was suddenly cancelled by the Canadian government on 20 February 1959, many Avro Canada engineers including Roberts followed the lead of Jim Chamberlin and moved to the United States to join NASA's Space Task Group at Langley Research Center in Hampton, Virginia.

=== United States ===
==== Langley Research Center ====
Created in November 1958, the Space Task Group under the leadership of Robert Gilruth was tasked with superintending America's human spaceflight program, Project Mercury, having been given the responsibility of placing a human in orbit around the Earth. Of its original 37 engineers, 27 were from Langley Research Center and 10 had been assigned from Lewis Research Center in Cleveland, Ohio. In 1959, Gilruth's group was greatly expanded by the addition of the engineers from Canada who had been left without jobs when the Avro Arrow project was cancelled.

Roberts joined NASA in April 1959, one of a group of 25 engineers and technicians hired from Avro Canada by NASA. (Note: A total of 32 Avro Canada staff had actually set off for NASA but a number eventually turned down offers to remain in aviation companies such as Boeing, McDonnell Douglas and North American Aviation.) He was involved immediately in formulating the requirements for the tracking and communications network, and the Mercury Mission Control Center to provide the flight control of the missions.

==== Mission Control Centers ====
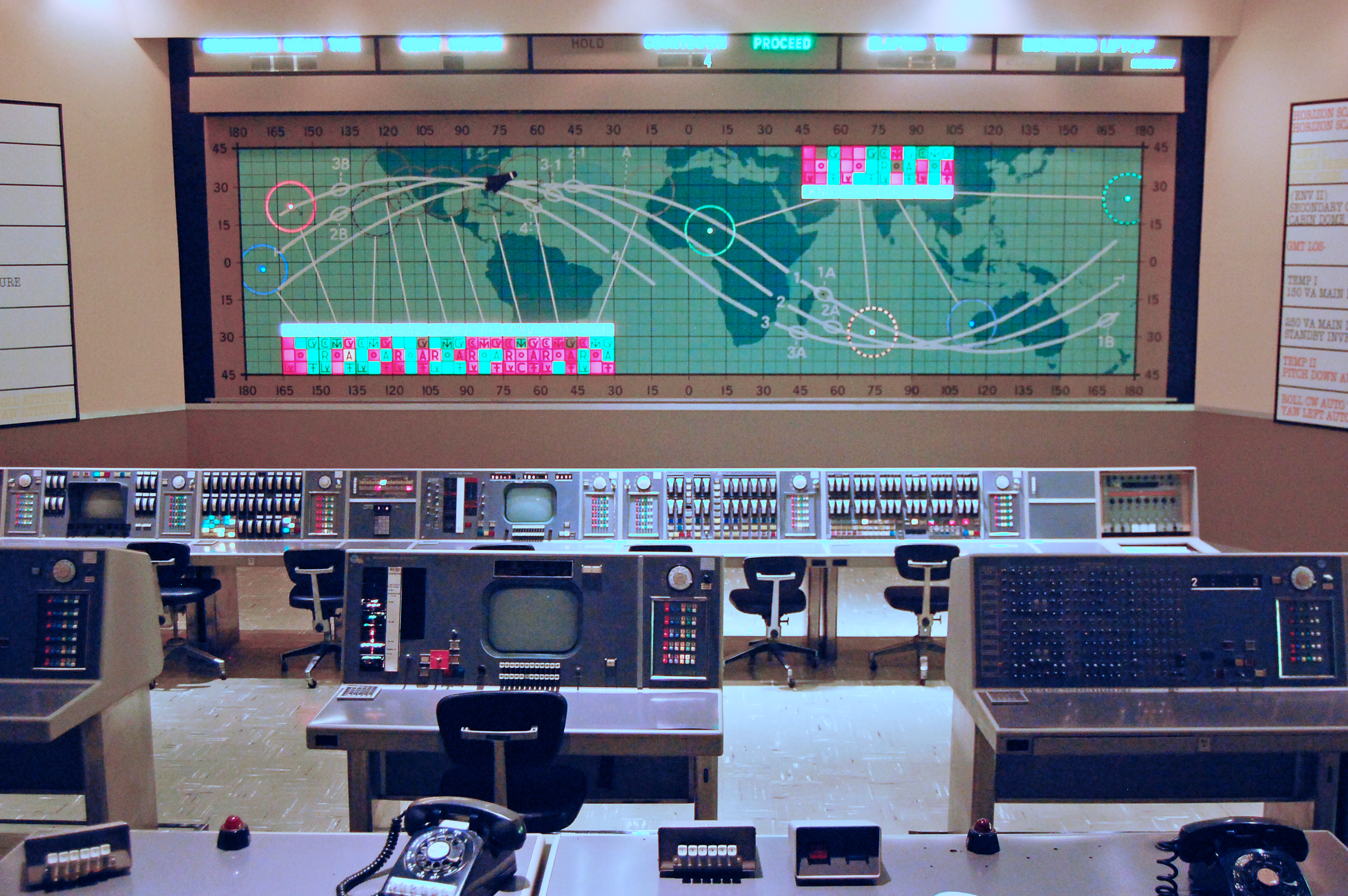
Recreation of Mercury Control with a map showing the location of the Mercury stations

In 1960, Roberts became NASA's first Flight Dynamics Officer at the Mercury Control Center, where his tasks centered on controlling the trajectory of the spacecraft and planning adjustments to it.

Roberts may have popularised the use of the phrase "A-OK", making those three letters a universal symbol meaning "in perfect working order." The first documented use of the English language phrase "A-OK" is contained within a memo from Tecwyn Roberts, Flight Dynamics Officer, to Flight Director (entitled "Report on Test 3805", dated 2 February 1961) in penciled notes on the countdown of MR-2, dated 31 January 1961. U.S. Air Force Lt. Col. John "Shorty" Powers popularised the expression while NASA's public affairs officer for Project Mercury.

In 1962, Roberts was appointed head of the Mission Control Center Requirements Branch, as which he played a key role in the design and further development of the Mercury Control Center at Cape Kennedy and also at the subsequent Mission Control Center at the Manned Spacecraft Center (later Johnson Space Center) in Houston, Texas, where NASA's human spaceflight program had been transferred in 1961. NASA's concept of Mission Control had previously been developed under the leadership of Christopher C. Kraft. When Roberts assumed his new position, Glynn Lunney succeeded him as Flight Dynamics Officer. As head of the Mission Control Center Requirements Branch, he was assigned responsibilities for determination, coordination and implementation of all design requirements for the construction of the new Mission Control Center in Houston. For his accomplishments in that area, Roberts received the NASA Outstanding Achievement Award.

On 21 May 1962, Roberts was appointed head of Manned Flight Division at the Goddard Space Flight Center in Greenbelt, Maryland. At that time, Roberts and his wife also resided in Maryland. Their only child, Michael (born about 1960), attended Spalding High School in Severn, Maryland.

==== Goddard Space Flight Center ====
In July 1964, Roberts became Technical Assistant to the Deputy Assistant Director of Tracking and Data systems at Goddard Space Flight Center, and chief of the Manned Flight Engineering Division. This put Roberts in charge of NASA's Manned Space Flight Network, a set of tracking stations built to support the American space efforts of Mercury, Gemini, Apollo and Skylab. There were two other space communication networks at this time, the Spacecraft Tracking and Data Acquisition Network (STADAN) for tracking unmanned satellites in low Earth orbit, and the Deep Space Network (DSN) for tracking more distant uncrewed missions.

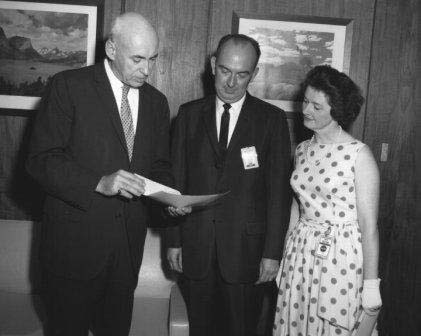
In 1964, Dr. Robert R. Gilruth, director of the Manned Space Center (Note: The NASA Manned Space Center became the Lyndon B. Johnson Space Center in 1973.) (left) presented a $1,000 cash award and certificate to Tecwyn Roberts (center), flanked by Roberts' wife Doris.

Also in summer 1964, he was honoured by Gilruth with the NASA Special Service Award for his contribution to the manned space flight program in the area of flight operations. The award was primarily for his determining the technical requirements of the Manned Spaceflight Control Center.

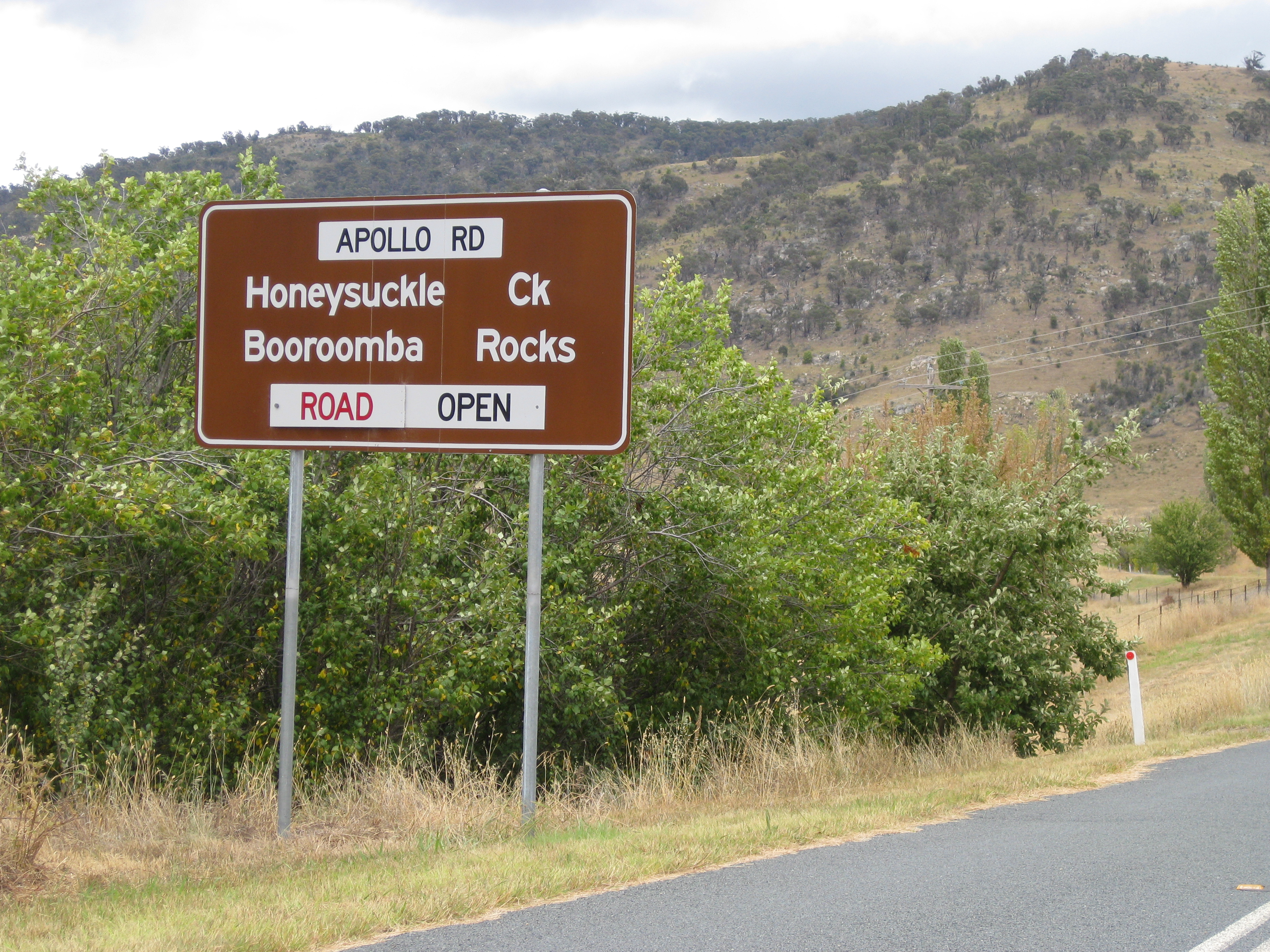
Apollo Road – The road to Honeysuckle Creek.

Roberts became chief of the Manned Flight Support Division at the Goddard Space Flight Center during the Apollo program in 1965. To support the Apollo program, Goddard commissioned three 85 ft (26 m) antennas that would be equally spaced around the world. These were in Madrid (Spain), Goldstone in California (USA) and at Honeysuckle Creek in Australia. Roberts was present when the Honeysuckle Creek Tracking Station was opened by Australian Prime Minister Harold Holt on 17 March 1967.

Later in 1967, Roberts became Chief of the Network Engineering Division, which he headed during the first landing on the Moon. In 1969, he received the NASA Exceptional Service Medal for his work in support of the Apollo 8 flight. In 1972, Roberts became Director of Networks at the Goddard Space Flight Center, a position he still held by the time of the Apollo–Soyuz Test Project in July 1975. His chief responsibility in this role was to ensure that contact was maintained between the orbiting US and Soviet spacecraft. This was to be his last direct involvement with NASA's manned space flights.

In 1976, Roberts and Robert S. Cooper, the Director of the Goddard Space Flight Center, were elected Fellows of the American Astronautical Society.

== Retirement and death ==
In 1979, Roberts retired as Director of Networks at Goddard and from NASA and became a consultant to the Bendix Field Engineering Corporation.

On 26 November 1984, the Goddard Space Center honoured a group of 34 individuals including Roberts with the Robert H. Goddard Award of Merit, the highest level of recognition the Goddard Space Center can bestow on its employees.

Four years later, Tecwyn Roberts died on 27 December 1988, aged 63 years. He was buried at St. Stephens Episcopal Cemetery, Crownsville, Maryland. Inscribed upon his gravestone is "Tecwyn Roberts, Husband of Doris & father of Michael".

== Awards and citations ==
- 1964 NASA Exceptional Service Award
- 1967 NASA Outstanding Achievement Award
- 1969 NASA Exceptional Service Medal
- 1976 Fellow of the American Astronautical Society
- 1980 NASA Distinguished Service Award
- 1984 Robert H. Goddard Award of Merit
