= Space Flight Award =

Award of the American Astronautical Society

The Space Flight Award is an award given by the American Astronautical Society most years since 1955. It is presented to "the person whose outstanding efforts and achievements have contributed most significantly to the advancement of space flight and space exploration". The Society refers to the Space Flight Award as its "highest award".

Year	Recipient	References
2021	Tory Bruno	
2020	Kathryn Lueders	
2018	Ann P. Over	
2017	Peggy Whitson	
2016	Robert Meyerson	
2015	Stamatios M. Krimigis	
2014	Norman R. Augustine	
2013	Charles F. Bolden, Jr.	
2012	Michael T. Suffredini	
2011	Space Shuttle Program	
2010	William H. Gerstenmaier	
2009	Glynn S. Lunney	
2008	A. Thomas Young	
2007	Charles J. Pellerin, Jr.	
2006	Robert G. Hoey	
2005	Charles Elachi	
2004	Harold W. Gehman, Jr.	
2003	Sally K. Ride	
2002	Roy S. Estess	
2001	John Glenn	
2000	Eileen M. Collins	
1999	Neil A. Armstrong	
1998	C. Michael Foale	
1997	Shannon W. Lucid	
1996	Edward C. Stone	
1995	Daniel S. Goldin	
1994	Carolyn L. Huntoon	
1993	John W. Young	
1992	Forrest S. McCartney	
1990	Aaron Cohen	
1989	John R. Casani	
1988	Robert O. Aller	
1987	James B. Odom	
1986	Eugene F. Kranz	
1985	Jesse W. Moore	
1984	James M. Beggs	
1983	George W. S. Abbey	
1982	Chester M. Lee	
1981	William R. Lucas	
1980	Robert F. Thompson	
1979	George W. Jeffs	
1978	Walter C. Williams	
1977	John F. Yardley	
1976	Sigurd A. Sjoberg	
1975	Maxime A. Faget, Walker E. Giberson	
1974	William C. Schneider	
1973	Rocco A. Petrone	
1972	Charles W. Mathews	
1971	Joseph G. Gavin, Jr.	
1970	Edgar M. Cortright	
1969	Christopher C. Kraft, Jr.	
1968	George M. Low, George E. Mueller	
1967	Kurt H. Debus, William H. Pickering	
1966	Robert R. Gilruth	
1965	Hugh L. Dryden (Posthumously)	
1962	Charles Stark Draper	
1961	Fred L. Whipple	
1960	Homer E. Newell Jr.	
1958	James A. van Allen	
1957	Wernher von Braun	
1956	George W. Hoover	
1955	Hermann Oberth	

== See also ==
- List of space technology awards
