= Sigurd A. Sjoberg =

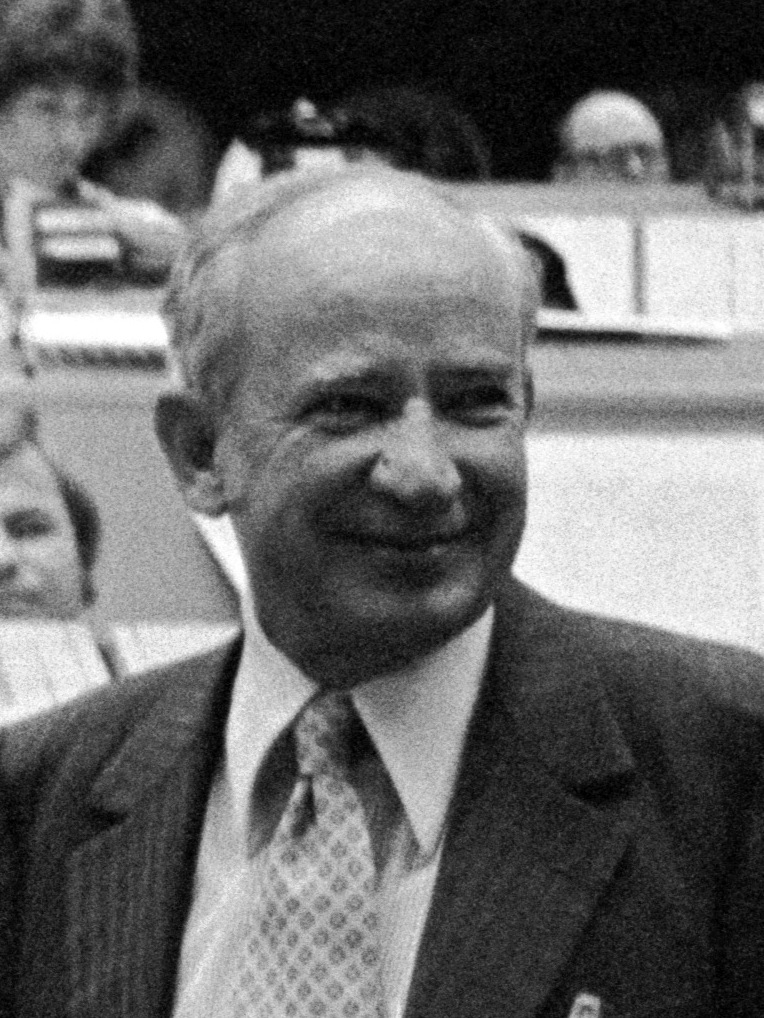
- Sjoberg in 1974
- Born: Sigurd Arnold Sjoberg; September 2, 1919; Minneapolis, Minnesota, U.S.
- Died: March 26, 2000 (aged 80); Clear Lake, Texas, U.S.
- Education: University of Minnesota, B.S. 1942
- Occupation: NASA deputy director for the Manned Spacecraft Center
- Children: 3
- Awards: NASA Exceptional Service Medal; Space Flight Award; Presidential Medal of Freedom; NASA Distinguished Service Medal

Sigurd Arnold Sjoberg (September 2, 1919 — March 26, 2000) was the deputy director for the Manned Spacecraft Center from 1972 to 1979. Before his deputy director tenure, Sjoberg started his space career in 1942 with the National Advisory Committee for Aeronautics. As a member of the Langley Memorial Aeronautical Laboratory until the end of the 1950s, Sjoberg worked in aerodynamics and primarily conducted research. For his flight operations career, Sjoberg joined the Langley Research Center and Space Task Group in 1959.

After four years at Langley, Sjoberg was the deputy director for the MSC's flight operations department throughout the remainder of the 1960s. He also was the flight operations department's director from 1969 to 1972. While at NASA, Sjoberg worked on Project Mercury, Project Gemini and Project Apollo before leaving NASA in 1979. During the 1970s, some awards that Sjoberg received include the Presidential Medal of Freedom, NASA Distinguished Service Medal and Space Flight Award. He also became a member of the National Academy of Engineering and Fellow of the American Institute of Aeronautics and Astronautics.

== Early life and education ==
On September 2, 1919, Sjoberg was born in Minneapolis, Minnesota. Growing up, he lived with his two siblings and Swedish parents. For his post secondary education, Sjoberg graduated with a Bachelor of Science degree from the University of Minnesota in 1942 and specialized in aeronautical engineering.

== Career ==
=== NACA ===
After completing his studies, Sjoberg started his career with the National Advisory Committee for Aeronautics in 1942 when he worked in aerodynamics. As part of their Langley Memorial Aeronautical Laboratory, Sjoberg focused on aircraft stabilizers during World War II in the Flight Research Division. In 1946, Sjoberg started a decade long position at Langley as a Research Scientist.

Throughout the remainder of the 1950s, Sjoberg worked in Langley as their Airborne Analysis lead. Outside of Langley, Sjoberg briefly worked for the Douglas Aircraft Company during the mid 1940s in aerodynamics. As part of the NACA High Speed Flight Station, Sjoberg focused on several x-planes by Bell Aircraft and the Douglas D-558 until the end of the 1940s.

=== NASA ===
For his NASA career, Sjoberg joined the Space Task Group in 1959. With the task group, Sjoberg worked on Project Mercury until the early 1960s. During this time period, Sjoberg began his thirteen-year flight operations experience when he joined the Langley Research Center in 1959.

After completing his four-year coordinator tenure at Langley, Sjoberg started out as an assistant for the Manned Spacecraft Center in 1962. While at the flight operations department for the MSC, Sjoberg was their deputy director from 1963 to 1969 before becoming their flight operations director at the end of 1969. During his tenure, Sjoberg was part of the operations team when the Apollo 13 accident occurred in 1970. By 1972, Sjoberg had worked on Project Gemini and multiple spaceflights of Project Apollo.

That year, Sjoberg became the deputy director for the MSC and took over Christopher C. Kraft Jr.'s position. In 1973, the Manned Spacecraft Center was renamed to the Lyndon B. Johnson Space Center. While Skylab and the Apollo Soyuz Test Project were undergoing throughout the 1970s, Sjoberg continued to be part of Project Apollo. Sjoberg remained as deputy director until he ended his NASA career in 1979. That year, Sjoberg became the director of OAO Corporation for their Houston branch.

== Awards and honors ==
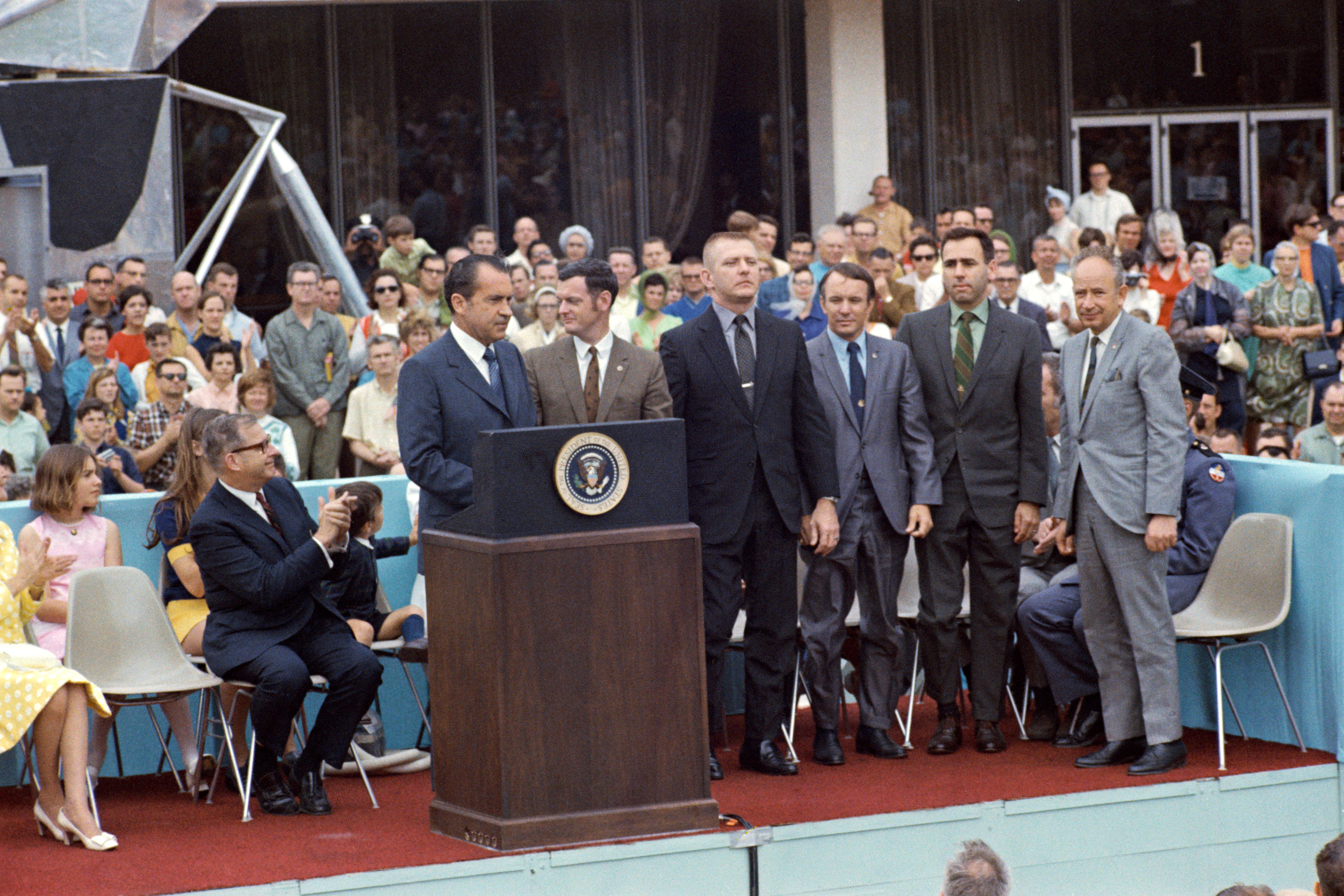
President Richard Nixon introduces Sigurd A. Sjoberg (far right), director of Flight Operations at Manned Spacecraft Center, and the four Apollo 13 flight directors during the President's post-mission visit to the Manned Spacecraft Center.

From NASA, Sjoberg received the NASA Exceptional Service Medal in 1969. He was also presented with the NASA Distinguished Service Medal in 1971. In April 1970, Sjoberg and the MSC were awarded the Presidential Medal of Freedom. From the University of Minnesota, Sjoberg received the Outstanding Achievement Award in 1973.

From the American Astronautical Society, Sjoberg received the Space Flight Award in 1976 and the William Randolph Lovelace II Award in 1977. He also became a fellow for the American Astronautical Society. Outside of the AAS, Sjoberg was named to the National Academy of Engineering in 1974. He was selected to be a Fellow of the American Institute of Aeronautics and Astronautics in 1976.

== Personal life and death ==
Sjoberg was married and had three children. His death occurred at Clear Lake, Texas during March 26, 2000.
