= NASA Exceptional Service Medal =

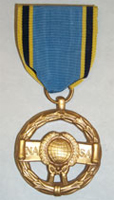
- NASA Exceptional Service Medal
- Type: Medal
- Country: United States
- Presented by: the National Aeronautics and Space Administration
- Established: July 29, 1959
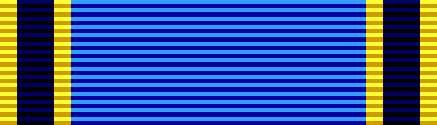
- NASA Exceptional Service Ribbon

Precedence
- Next (higher): NASA Outstanding Leadership Medal
- Next (lower): Exceptional Scientific Achievement Medal; Exceptional Engineering Achievement Medal; Exceptional Technology Achievement Medal; Exceptional Administrative Achievement Medal; Equal Employment Opportunity Medal

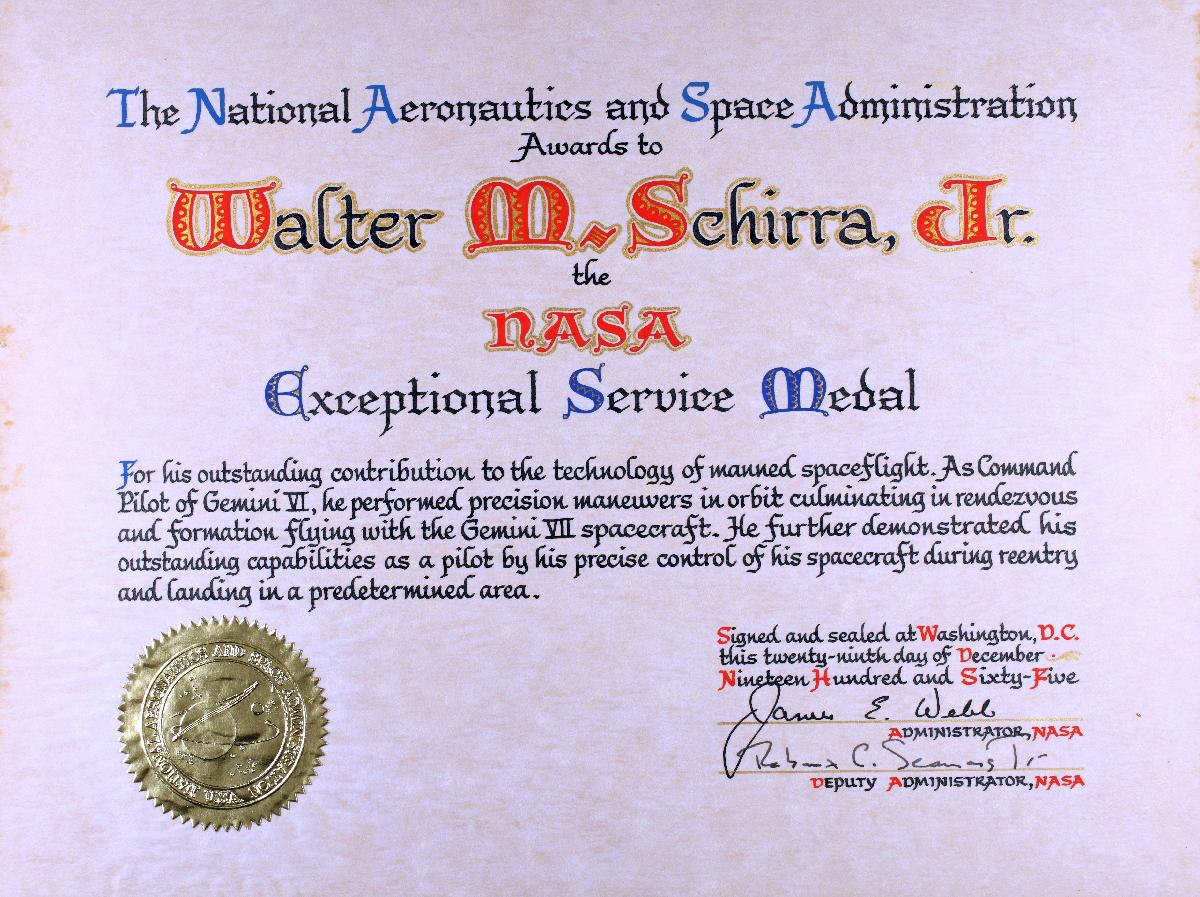
Certificate that accompanies the medal, given to Wally Schirra in 1964.

The NASA Exceptional Service Medal is an award granted to U.S. government employees for significant sustained performance characterized by unusual initiative or creative ability that clearly demonstrates substantial improvement in engineering, aeronautics, space flight, administration, support, or space-related endeavors which contribute to NASA programs.

The medal was inherited by NASA from its predecessor organization, the National Advisory Committee on Aeronautics (NACA) and featured the NACA emblem. The original NASA version featured the NASA seal.

== Notable recipients ==
- Clayton Anderson (2008,2011)
- Buzz Aldrin (1969)
- Robert O. Aller (twice)
- Aseel Anabtawi (2007)
- Neil Armstrong (1966)
- Brandon T. Bailey (2019)
- Charles Bolden (thrice)
- Frank Borman 1965
- John R. Casani (1965)
- Lin Chambers (2009)
- Kevin Chilton
- Eileen Collins (1998)
- Michael Collins (1966)
- Lana Couch (1986)
- Nagin Cox
- William H. Dana
- Jean Dickey (1998)
- John H. Disher (twice, last in 1980)
- Einar Enevoldson (1974 and 1980)
- Christer Fuglesang (2010)
- Fitzhugh L. Fulton (1977 and 1983)
- Alfred Gessow (1974)
- Isaac T. Gillam (1981 and 1982)
- Gus Grissom
- John M. Grunsfeld (1997, 1998, and 2000)
- Umberto Guidoni (2002)
- Joseph Gutheinz (2000)
- Chris Hadfield (2002)
- Karl Heimburg (1969)
- Joan E. Higginbotham
- David M. Jones
- Mark Kelly
- Don Leslie Lind (1974)
- James A. Lovell (with star)
- Paul D. Lowman
- John A. Manke
- William S. McArthur
- Pamela Matson
- Saverio "Sonny" Morea (twice)
- James B. Odom (1973)
- Robert J. Parks (1967)
- Julie Payette (2010)
- Kevin L. Petersen (1987)
- Arthur Rudolph
- Tecwyn Roberts (1969)
- Walter M. Schirra (1964 and 1968)
- David Scott (1966)
- Sigurd A. Sjoberg (1969)
- Deke Slayton
- Andrew J. Stofan (1975)
- Epaminondas Stassinopoulos (1992)
- Heidemarie Stefanyshyn-Piper
- Sheila Ann Thibeault (2000)
- Richard H. Truly (two awards)
- Peggy Whitson (1993, 2003, 2006, and 2008)
- David Williamson Jr. (three awards)
- John W. Young (1965 and 1966)
- R. Dale Reed (1967)

== See also ==
- Awards and decorations of the United States government
- NASA Distinguished Service Medal
