= A-okay =

More intensive word form of "OK"

A-okay or A-OK (/ˌeɪ.oʊˈkeɪ/) is a more intensive word form of the English term OK. The phrase can be accompanied by, or substituted with, the OK sign.

== History ==
The phrase "A-ok" had been in use at least as far back as 1952, when it appeared in an advertisement by Midvac Steels which read "A-OK for tomorrow's missile demands".

U.S. Air Force Lt. Col. John "Shorty" Powers popularized it while serving in the 1960s as NASA's public affairs officer for Project Mercury, the "voice of Mercury Control". He was reported as attributing the expression to astronaut Alan Shepard during his historic Freedom 7 flight, which was the United States' first crewed space flight. In his book The Right Stuff, author Tom Wolfe wrote that Powers had borrowed the expression from NASA engineers who used it during radio transmission tests because "the sharper sound of A cut through the static better than O".

The NASA publication, This New Ocean: A History of Project Mercury, says in a footnote that "A replay of the flight voice communications tape disclosed that Shepard himself did not use the term" and that "Tecwyn Roberts of STG and Capt. Henry E. Clements of the Air Force had used 'A.OK' frequently in reports written more than four months before the Shepard flight."
