= John H. Disher =

American aeronautical engineer

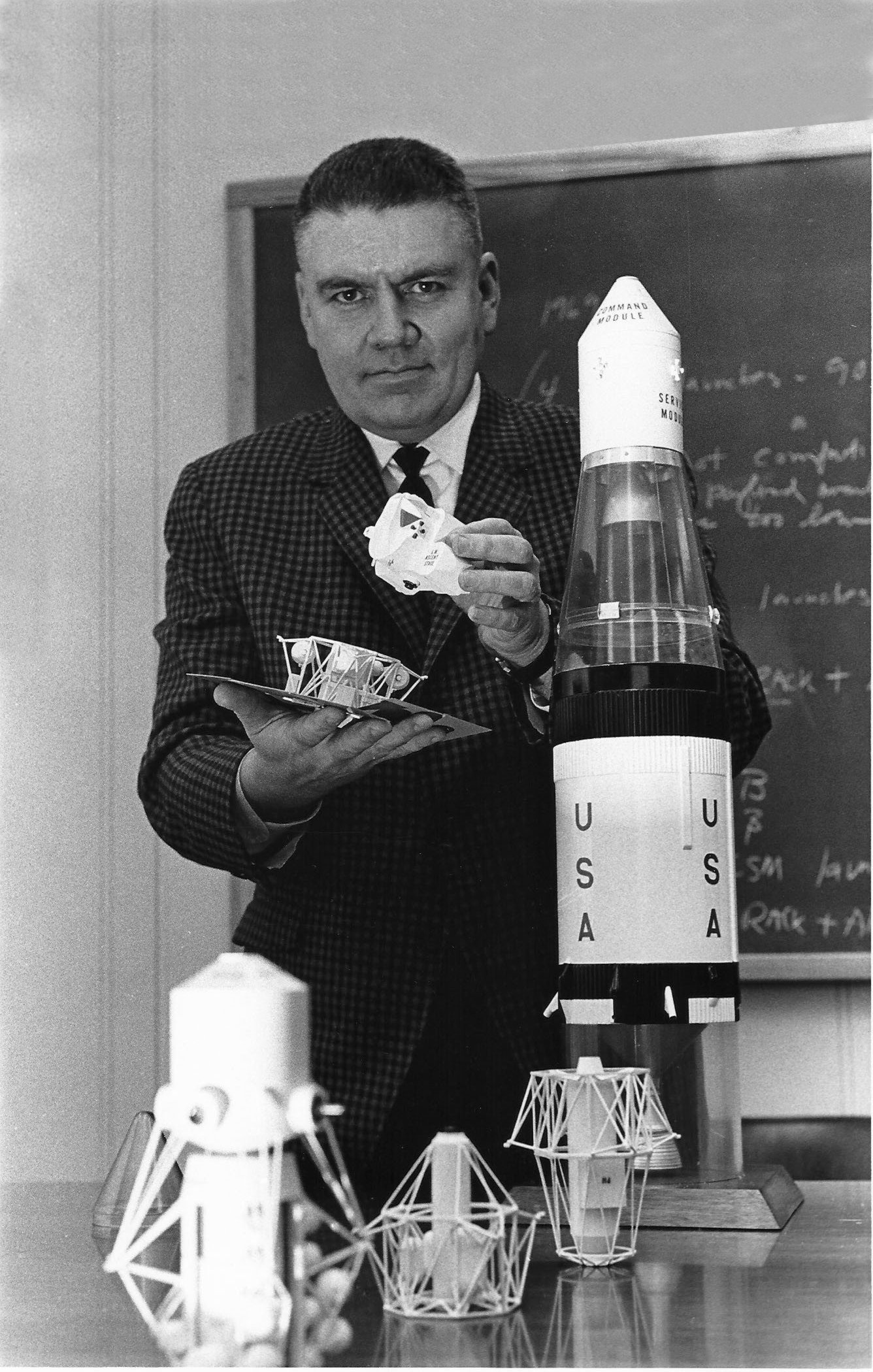
John H. Disher explaining the components of the Apollo program in 1967

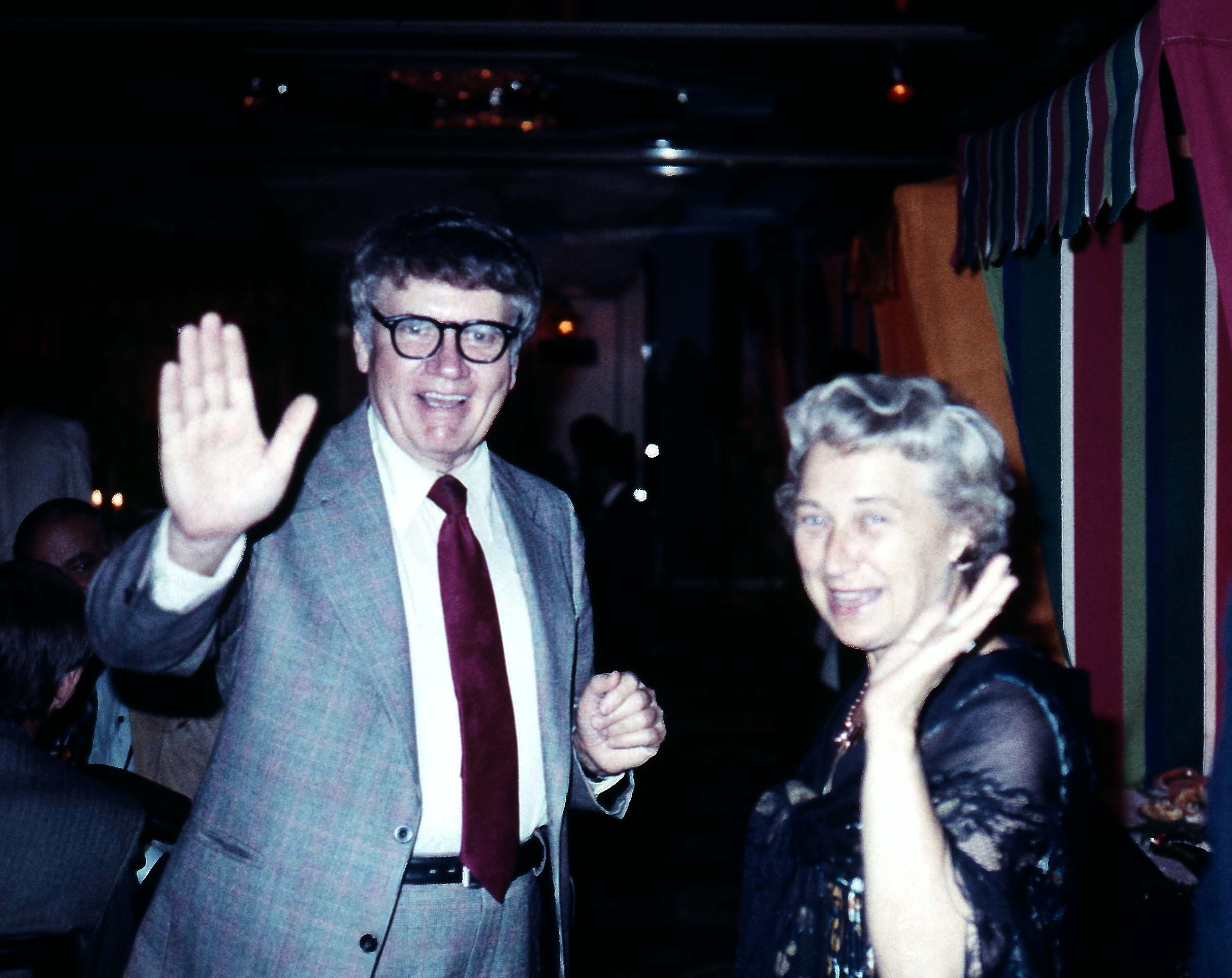
John H.Disher with his wife Lillian in September 1979.

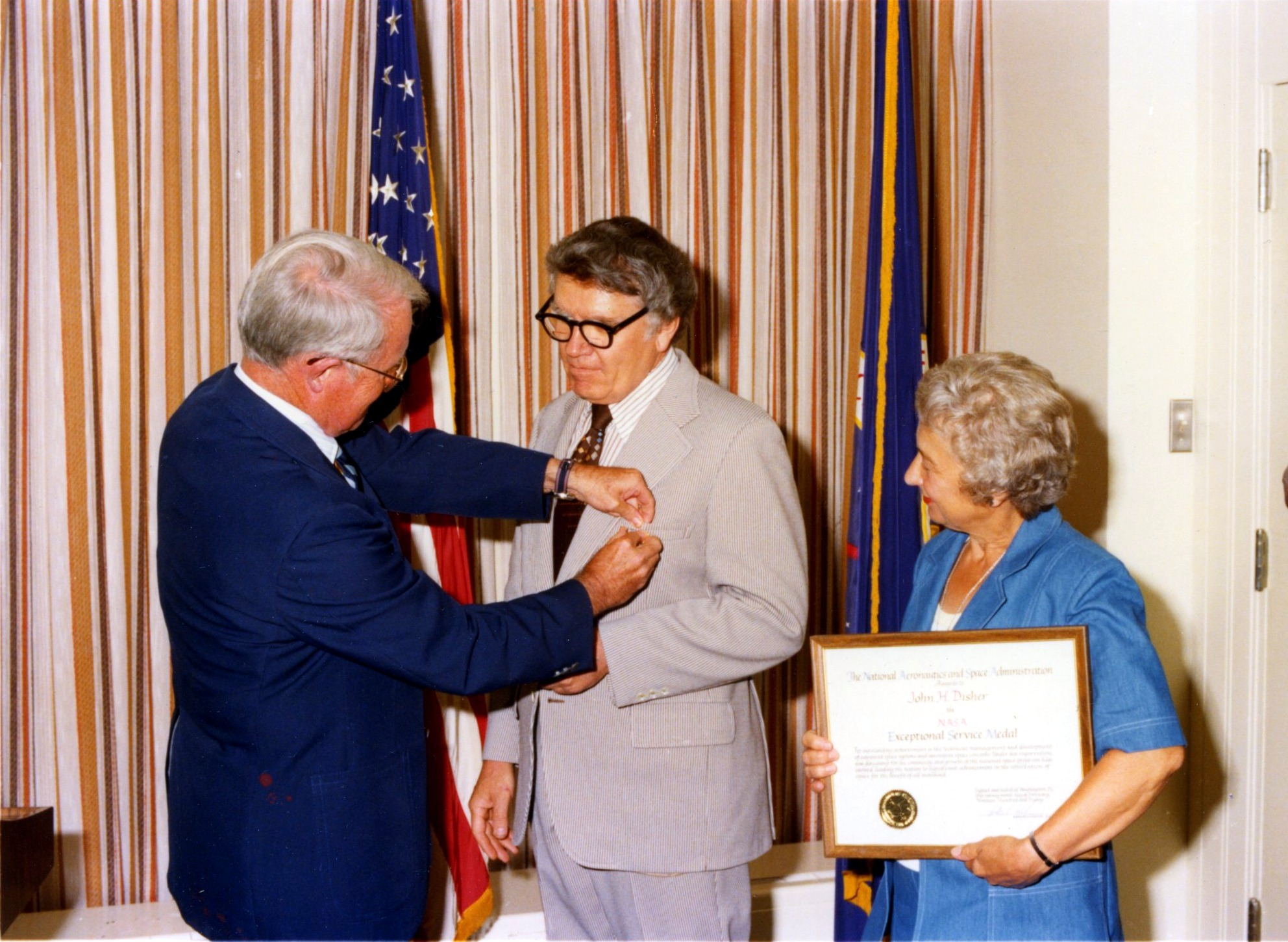
John H. Disher with his wife Lillian receiving the "NASA Exceptional Service Medal" in 1980 for his work on the Skylab program.

John Howard Disher (December 23, 1921 – August 27, 1988) was an American aeronautical engineer and NASA manager. For most of his life he worked for NASA during the Mercury, Gemini, Apollo, Skylab (deputy director) and Space Shuttle projects.

== Early life and education ==
Disher was born in Olmstead, Towner County, North Dakota. He was raised in Devils Lake, North Dakota and graduated from high school there in 1939. He earned a Bachelor of Science in mechanical engineering from the University of North Dakota, Grand Forks, in 1943. While at UND, he was a Sigma Nu fraternity member and was active in the University Concert and Marching Bands. He attended the six-week advanced management program at the Harvard Business School.

== Career ==
Disher began his federal career in 1943 with the National Advisory Committee for Aeronautics (NACA) at the Lewis Research Center in Cleveland. Some of his writings from that period are online here. From 1951 to 1958 he headed the flight research section at Lewis. He was just in time for the beginning of the U.S. space program. In 1959 and 1960, he worked at the Langley Space Research Center in Hampton, Virginia. and later at NASA headquarters in Washington D.C.

As a space scientist, he helped organize the Mercury and Gemini crewed space flight programs in the late 1950s and 1960s. In the position of Project Director he headed the Apollo Lunar Landing Program producing the initial studies of the Apollo program, which resulted in the first crewed lunar landing in 1969. Later he was deputy director of the Skylab space station program. He also worked on the Space Shuttle program, including development of a manned maneuvering unit. His last position before retirement was "Director of Advanced Projects".

After retiring from NASA in 1980, he opened a consulting business under the name of "Avanti Systems". His clients included the Italian government, Aeritalia/MBB-ERNO, Boeing Aerospace, and the U.S. Office of Technology Assessment. From 1986 until his death in 1988 he served on the University of North Dakota School of Engineering and Mines Advisory Council.

His alma mater, the University of North Dakota, maintains a collection of John Disher papers deposited by his widow.

== Awards and memberships ==
In 1973 Disher received the NASA Distinguished Service Medal and twice he received the NASA Exceptional Service Medal, the latter in 1980 for his work on Skylab.

He also received the Sioux Award from the University of North Dakota in 1974. He was a member of the International Academy of Astronautics and a fellow of the British Interplanetary Society.

He was a member of The Explorers Club of New York, the Corvair Society Of America and the United States Automobile Club Old Timers. He was an authority on racing and antique cars, and from 1948 to 1987 he served on the Technical Committee at the Indianapolis 500 Automobile Race.

He also was a member of the Bradley Hills Presbyterian Church in Bethesda, Maryland, where he and his family lived.

== Family ==
He was married to Lillian Helen Rusnak Disher in Cleveland, Ohio on April 9, 1948. They had two sons: James H. Disher and John Thomas Disher.

== Death ==
After fighting the symptoms of cancer for about one year, Disher died at the age of 66 on August 27, 1988 at George Washington University Hospital.

== Publications ==
- Disher, John (1948). Flight Investigation of a 20-Inch-Diameter Steady-Flow Ram Jet. PN. ASIN B00N6EDEHI.
- Disher, John (1981). Between Sputnik and the Shuttle: New Perspectives on American Astronautics (Aas History Series; V. 3). Univelt. ISBN 978-0877031499.
