= Sheila Ann Thibeault =

American physicist

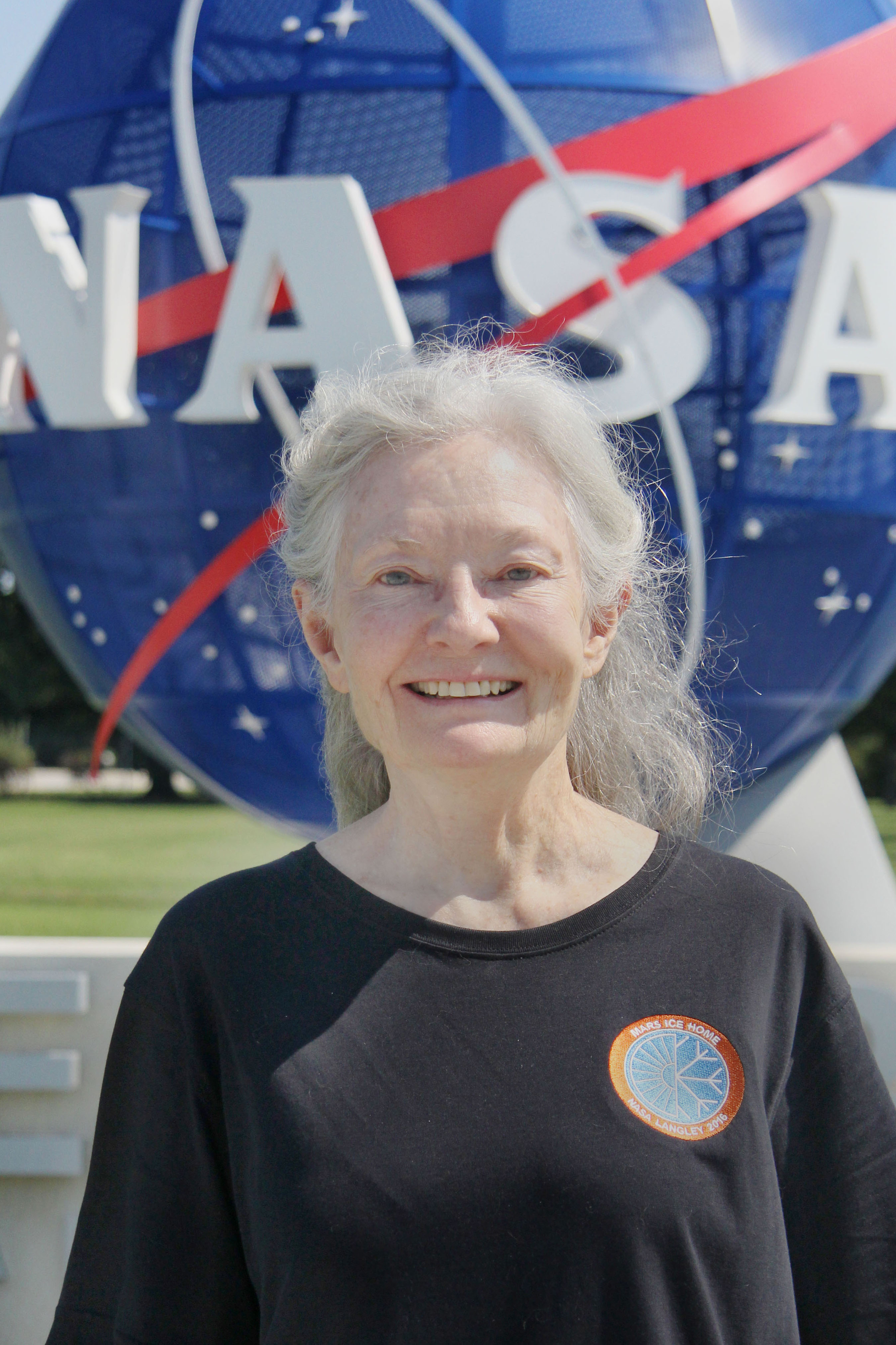
- Thibeault c. 2019
- Citizenship: United States
- Education: College of William & Mary (BS); North Carolina State University (MS, PhD)

Sheila Ann Thibeault is an American physicist and materials scientist who has worked at NASA's Langley Research Center since the 1960s. She is known for her early work on the Apollo program's Rendezvous Docking Simulator and for her subsequent decades-long research career developing space-durable materials and radiation shielding for astronauts.

== Early life and education ==
A native of Williamsburg, Virginia, Thibeault earned a Bachelor of Science in physics from the College of William & Mary in June 1966. She went on to earn an Masters and a PhD in physics from North Carolina State University.

== Career ==
=== Apollo program ===
Thibeault first joined NASA's Langley Research Center as a summer hire between her junior and senior years at College of William & Mary, during the height of the Apollo program. Returning as a permanent member of NASA in August 1966, she found her role helping build and test the Rendezvous Docking Simulator, a facility used to train Apollo astronauts for the lunar-orbit rendezvous manoeuvre used to dock the lunar module with the command module and bring astronauts home from the Moon. Her work focused on identifying and correcting visual distortion in the simulator so astronauts could accurately judge alignment during docking, both in training and during the actual missions. The simulator was designated a National Historic Landmark in 1985.

=== Materials science and radiation shielding research ===
Since 1981, Thibeault's research has centered on the development of space-durable materials and radiation shielding systems for spacecraft and astronauts. From 2006 to 2009, she served as Task Lead for the Radiation Shielding Task under NASA's Exploration Technology Development Program (ETDP).

She has served as Langley's Principal Investigator for several missions in the Materials International Space Station Experiment (MISSE) series (MISSE 1, 2, 3, 4, 5, 6A, and 6B), and since 2008, has been the Project Principal Investigator for MISSE 6A and 6B. She was also the Project Principal Investigator for MISSE-X from its inception in 2010, and has had experiments manifested on MISSE 9, 10, and 11, including the Polymeric Materials Experiment on MISSE-9.

In 2011, she was named a NASA Innovative Advanced Concepts (NIAC) Fellow.

As of 2012, she holds the position of Senior Research Physicist in the Advanced Materials and Processing Branch, Research Directorate, at NASA Langley.

== Publications, patents, and honors ==
Thibeault is the author or co-author of more than 200 formal publications and conference presentations on topics including polymer composites, boron-containing polyimides, nanomaterials for radiation shielding, and the performance of materials exposed to the low-Earth-orbit environment.

She holds multiple United States patents related to polymer composite materials, including low-creep and low-stress-relaxation polymer composites for aerospace applications.

She received the NASA Exceptional Service Medal in 2000.

== Selected publications ==
- Thibeault, Sheila A.; Kang, Jin Ho; Sauti, Godfrey; Park, Cheol; Fay, Catharine C.; King, Glen C. (2015). "Nanomaterials for radiation shielding". MRS Bulletin. 40 (10): 836–841. Bibcode:2015MRSBu..40..836T. doi:10.1557/mrs.2015.225.
- Kang, Jin Ho; Sauti, Godfrey; Park, Cheol; Yamakov, Vesselin I.; Wise, Kristopher E.; Lowther, Sharon E.; Fay, Catharine C.; Thibeault, Sheila A.; Bryant, Robert G. (22 December 2015). "Multifunctional Electroactive Nanocomposites Based on Piezoelectric Boron Nitride Nanotubes". ACS Nano. 9 (12): 11942–11950. Bibcode:2015ACSNa...911942K. doi:10.1021/acsnano.5b04526. PMID 26529472.
