= John A. Powers =

NASA public affairs officer (1922–1979)

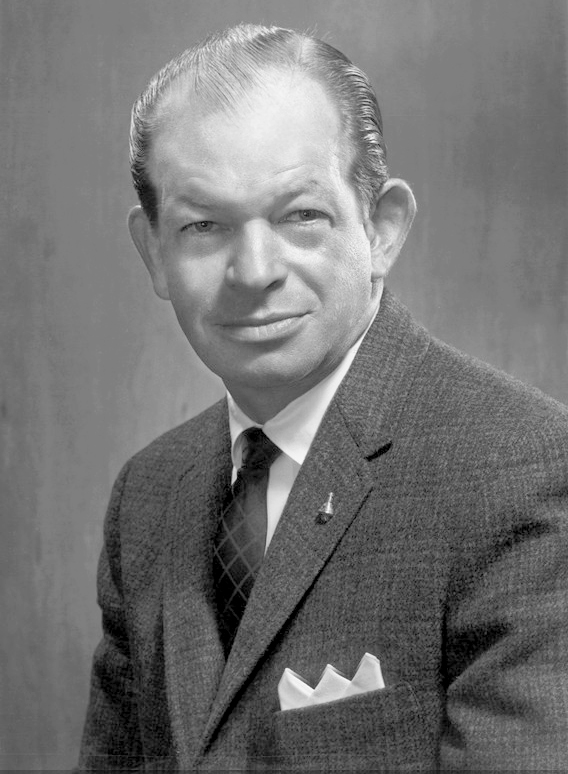
- 1962 NASA portrait
- Born: John Anthony Powers; August 22, 1922; Toledo, Ohio, U.S.
- Died: December 31, 1979 (aged 57); Phoenix, Arizona, U.S.
- Burial place: Phoenix, Arizona, U.S.
- Military career
- Allegiance: United States
- Branch: U.S. Air Force
- Rank: Lieutenant colonel
- Nickname: Shorty Powers
- Units: 349th Troop Carrier Group (WWII); 13th Bombardment Squadron (Korean War)
- Awards: Bronze Star; Air Medal; Distinguished Flying Cross
- Other work: Project Mercury public affairs officer

John Anthony Powers (August 22, 1922 – December 31, 1979), better known as Shorty Powers, was an American public affairs officer for NASA from 1959 to 1963 during Project Mercury. A U.S. Air Force lieutenant colonel and war veteran, he was known as the "voice of the astronauts," the "voice of Mercury Control," and the "eighth astronaut". He received the nickname "Shorty" for his 5-foot, 6-inch (1.68 m) height. In the mid-1960s, he was a TV commercial spokesperson for Oldsmobile.

== Biography ==
Powers was born August 22, 1922, to Welsh immigrant parents in Toledo, Ohio. Powers father's last name was actually Power, however, upon signing the immigration documents, Power became Powers. When Powers was an infant his family moved to Downers Grove, Illinois, where he was a cheerleader at Downers Grove High School (currently Downers Grove North High School, but at that time there was only one public high school), from which he graduated in 1941. After graduation, he enlisted in the U.S. Army Air Corps in 1942 and became a C-46 and C-47 pilot with the 349th Troop Carrier Group. He was one of six pilots who volunteered to learn the technique of snatching fully loaded troop gliders off the ground, and spent the end of World War II ferrying gasoline in cargo planes to Gen. George Patton's command in Germany.

Powers left the service in January 1947; but was recalled to active duty in December 1948 and flew as part of the Berlin Airlift, making 185 round-trip flights. He later volunteered for the Korean War. He flew 55 night missions in B-26 bombers with the 13th Bombardment Squadron and received the Bronze Star Medal, the Air Medal, the Distinguished Flying Cross and a combat promotion to Major.

Following Korea, Powers bounced around the Air Force, helping establish the first Community Relations Program in 1955. After being assigned to the personal staff of Maj. Gen. Bernard Schriever with the Air Research Development Command in Los Angeles, he handled the public dissemination of information related to the Air Force's ballistic missile program.

=== Project Mercury ===
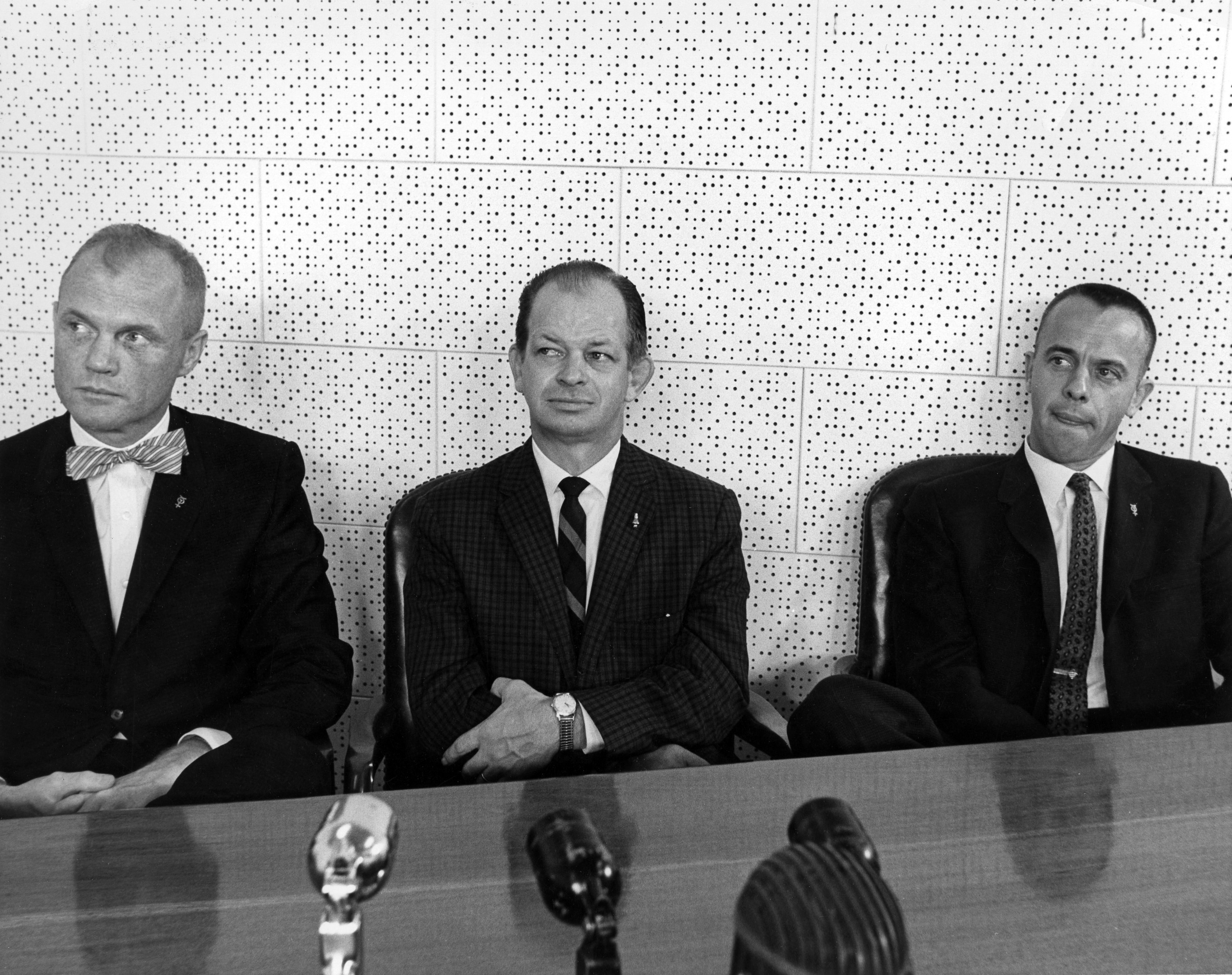
Powers sits between Mercury astronauts John Glenn (left) and Alan Shepard at a 1961 news conference at Cape Canaveral

Powers' experience with public affairs caught the attention of the newly formed NASA, and he was detailed to NASA's Space Task Group in April 1959 as its public affairs officer at the request of T. Keith Glennan, NASA's first administrator. Very early on April 12, 1961, John G. Warner, a UPI rewrite-man in Washington, D.C., roused Powers from sleep at Langley Research Center in Hampton, Virginia seeking comment on the flight of Soviet cosmonaut Yuri Gagarin, the first person in space. Powers replied, in part, "We're all asleep down here," which made headlines.

He served as mission commentator for the six crewed Mercury flights, introducing "A-OK" into the American vocabulary to signify procedures during the missions had proceeded as planned. He claimed astronaut Alan Shepard first used the expression during his Freedom 7 flight, but communication transcripts later showed he had not. In his 1979 book The Right Stuff, Tom Wolfe wrote that Powers had borrowed it "from NASA engineers who used it during radio transmission tests because the sharper sound of A cut through the static better than O".

Powers enjoyed the limelight, and was accused of scheduling news conferences so he could appear live on national television and occasionally twisting the facts. For example, he told reporters the day before Gus Grissom's flight that the astronaut had gone fishing that day and had cooked and eaten his catch, which would have violated his pre-flight diet.

Manned Spacecraft Center Director Robert Gilruth announced Powers' reassignment on July 26, 1963, reportedly following a dispute with NASA Headquarters over handling publicity for the final Mercury flight. Powers objected to the HQ decision to release the mission's 22-orbit flight plan in advance. He was succeeded by Paul Haney on September 1, and Powers soon resigned.

=== Later years ===
Powers retired from the Air Force in 1964 and opened a public relations firm in Houston. He became part owner of KMSC-FM in Clear Lake, Texas (the call letters standing for the Manned Spacecraft Center), where he anchored live coverage of Gemini and Apollo flights, distributed to radio stations across the country. He also served a spokesman for products including the 1965 Oldsmobile Delta 88 (touting its "Super Rocket V-8" engine), Carrier air conditioners, Triptone motion sickness pills, and Tareyton cigarettes (which claimed to use the same charcoal-activated filter used for the astronauts' oxygen supply). He lectured extensively about the space program, and served as emcee at the dedication of the Clear Lake Theatre Time Capsule on April 20, 1966. In 1967, he authored a newspaper column syndicated nationally by Field Enterprises called "Space Talk", answering readers' questions.

Powers was married three times and was the father of three children. He married Sara Kay McSherry, women's editor of the Indianapolis News, on August 7, 1965.

Powers moved to Phoenix, Arizona in 1978, and died there at his home on December 31, 1979, at age 57 from a gastrointestinal hemorrhage related to chronic alcoholism.

== Film and TV ==
Powers appeared as himself in the 1963 episode entitled "Junior Astronaut" of CBS's sitcom, Dennis the Menace, starring Jay North in the title role.

He was the narrator for the 1966 Jerry Lewis space comedy, Way...Way Out.

He is referenced in the 1988 cult film, Miracle Mile, by actor Kurt Fuller when, as Soviet warheads appear over Los Angeles, a drug-addled, panicked character in the movie yells, "Talk me down, Shorty Powers".

He appears in Season One, Episode Three of the alt-historical 2019 TV series For All Mankind.

He is portrayed by actor Danny Strong in the Disney+ series The Right Stuff (2020), based on the 1979 book of the same title by Tom Wolfe.

== Notes ==
- Benedict, Howard "'Voice of the Astronauts' Shorty Powers Dead" (January 3, 1980), The Associated Press
- "Shorty Powers, 'voice of the astronauts,' is found dead at 57" (January 3, 1980), St. Petersburg Times, p. 1-A
