= Aseel Anabtawi =

Palestinian-American electrical engineer

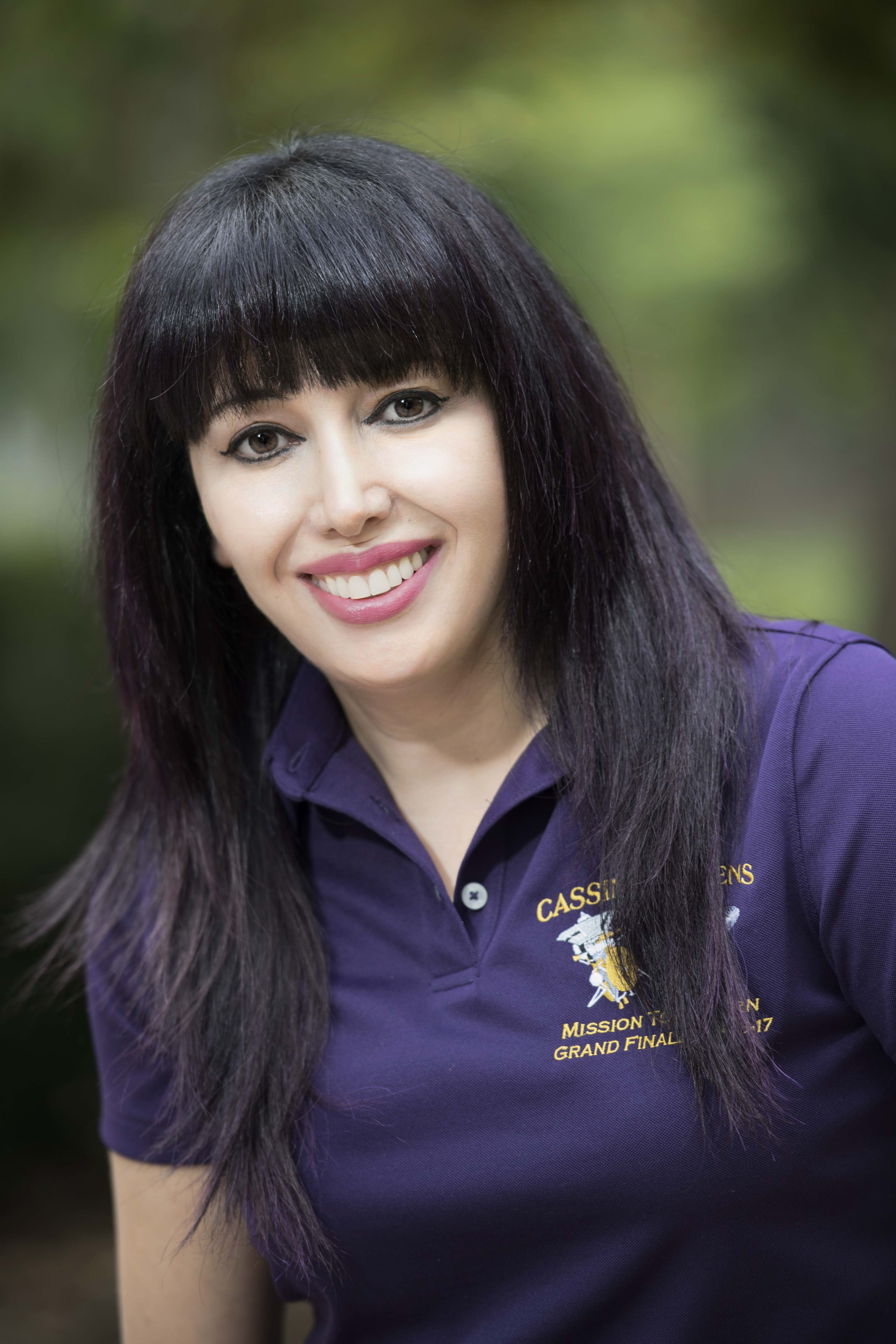
- Anabtawi in 2017, wearing her "Cassini-Huygens Mission to Saturn Grand Finale" polo shirt
- Born: August 15, 1969 (age 57); Tulkarm, Palestine
- Education: California State University, Fullerton (1992); University of Southern California (1996)
- Occupation: Electrical engineer
- Years active: 1993–
- Known for: Cassini–Huygens mission

Aseel Anabtawi (Arabic: أسيل عنبتاوي, born 1969) is a Palestinian-American electrical engineer from Tulkarm who works for the NASA Jet Propulsion Laboratory. Prior to this, she has worked in radio science on various NASA missions.

== Biography ==
Aseel Anabtawi was born in 1969 in Tulkarm in Palestine's West Bank. She is the daughter of Jamal Anabtawi, an engineer, and Hosnia Ibrahim Al-Ashqar. Her mother, Al-Ashqar, had a long and distinguished career in education, serving as a teacher for many years in schools across both Tulkarm and the State of Kuwait. Her family later emigrated to the United States. She received her bachelor's degree in electrical and computer engineering from California State University, Fullerton in 1992. In 1996, she obtained her master's degree in the same field from the University of Southern California.

Anabtawi started work at NASA's Jet Propulsion Laboratory in 1993. She has participated in multiple projects during her employ at NASA. At the beginning of her time at the Jet Propulsion Laboratory, Anabtawi worked on the Galileo Jupiter probe. She also worked on the Mars Global Surveyor, a robotic probe that explored and mapped Mars, from its atmosphere to its rocky surface.

Following her work on Galileo and the Mars Global Surveyor, Anabtawi was selected to participate in the Cassini–Huygens mission in 2003. This mission, a collaborative effort between NASA, the European Space Agency, and the Italian Space Agency, sent two unmanned crafts to Saturn. The Huygens landed on the surface of Saturn's moon Titan. Anabtawi worked with Cassini, a space probe which explored and photographed Saturn's atmosphere, sending back valuable data for NASA scientists. Information gathered from the Cassini mission gave researchers a better understanding of Saturn's interior structure and rings.

Anabtawi co-authored one of the 2022 IEEE Aerospace Conference (AERO) paper Preparing the Mars Relay Network for the Arrival of the Preserverance Rover at Mars, which discusses the Mars Relay Network (MRN) strategies used to enhance data acquisition, support critical event communications, and enable the rapid return of EDL telemetry.

As of 2022, Anabtawi is part of the Mars Science Laboratory team, the mission that landed the Curiosity rover on Mars.

Anabtawi was awarded the NASA Exceptional Achievement Medal in 2007 for her work on the Cassini project. In 2015, she received the NASA Exceptional Service Medal for her continuing work with the Jet Propulsion Laboratory.
