= Nagin Cox =

NASA scientist

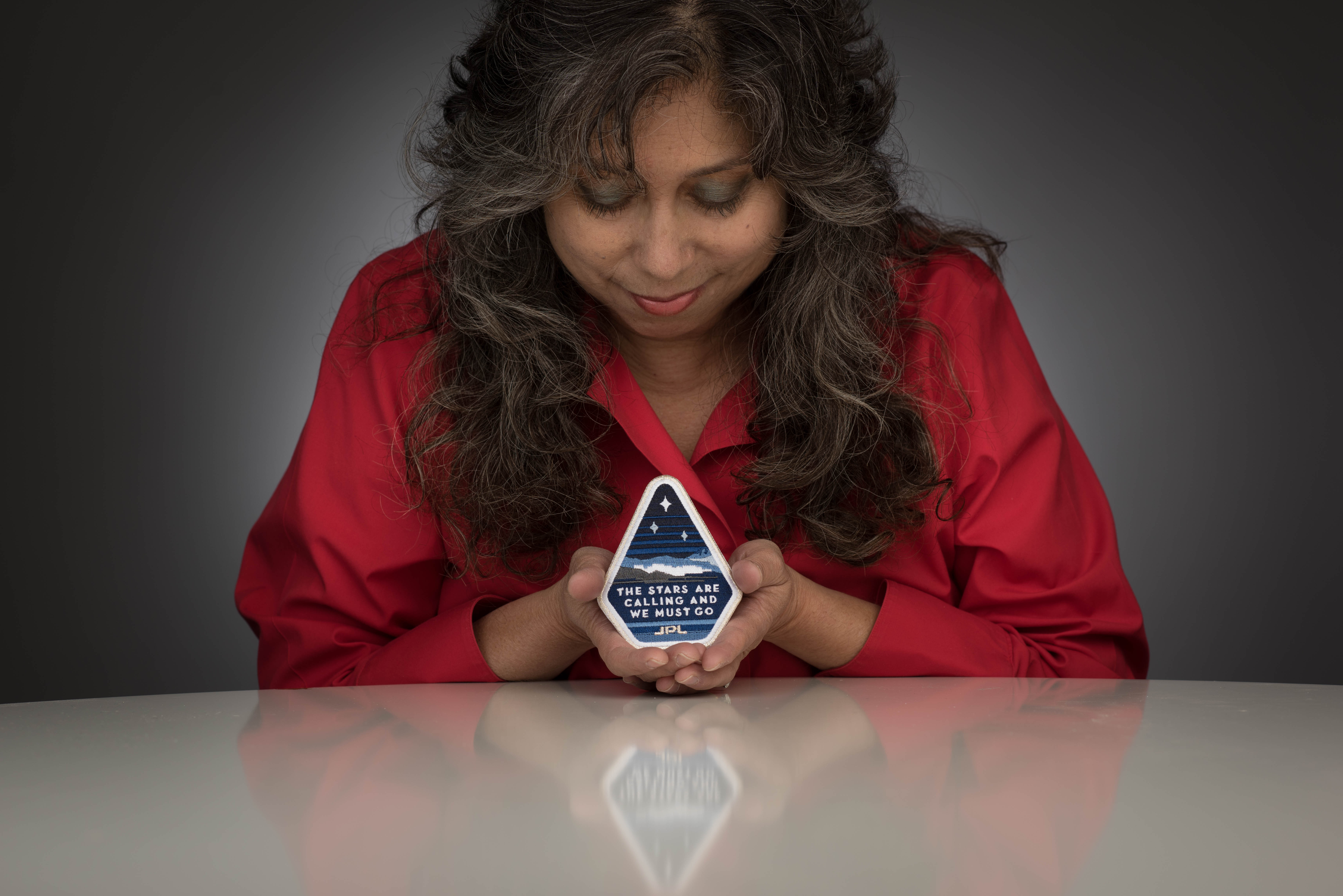
- Cox in 2018
- Born: 1965 (age 60–61); Bangalore
- Education: Cornell University
- Scientific career
- Workplaces: Jet Propulsion Laboratory; North American Aerospace Defense Command

Zainab Nagin Cox (born 1965) is a spacecraft operations engineer at Jet Propulsion Laboratory who received the NASA Exceptional Service Medal. Asteroid 14061 was named "Nagincox" after her in 2015.

== Early life and education ==
Cox was born in Bangalore and grew up in Kuala Lumpur and Kansas City, Kansas. She went to school at Shawnee Mission East High School, where she became interested in Star Trek and Cosmos: A Spacetime Odyssey. She studied engineering and psychology at Cornell University, graduating in 1986, and earned a master's degree in space operations systems engineering from Air Force Institute of Technology in 1990.

== Career ==
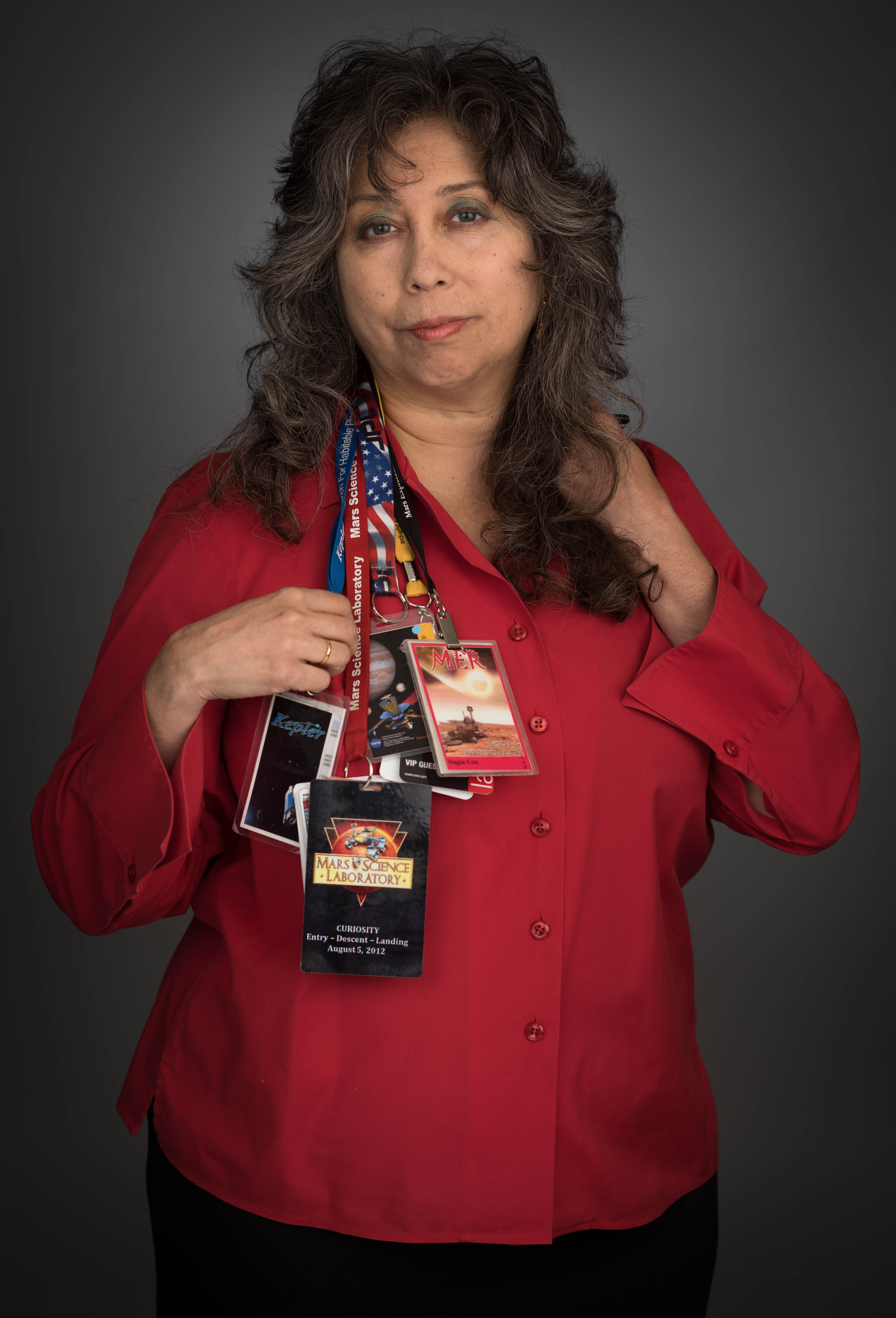
Cox in 2018, wearing her mission lanyards collected from more than two decades at JPL.

After graduating, Cox worked for the United States Air Force as a space operations officer, in F-16 aircrew training. She also worked as an orbital analyst at the North American Aerospace Defense Command. Cox has worked as a spacecraft operations engineer at Jet Propulsion Laboratory since 1993 and has been involved with several interplanetary robotic missions, including Galileo, InSight, Kepler, and the Mars Curiosity rover. She is a tactical mission lead, in charge of the uplink, downlink, and advance planning teams. Asteroid 14061 Nagincox, discovered in 1996, was named after her in 2015. She won the NASA Exceptional Service Medal, the Bruce Murray award in 2014 and has won the NASA Exceptional Achievement Medal twice.

=== Public engagement and diversity ===
Cox is passionate about increasing diversity within sciences, engineering and NASA. She served on the board of directors at Griffith Observatory, as well as on the President's Council for Cornell Women Alumni. She is an invited speaker for the United States Department of State, travelling the world and talking about her career and NASA's robotic space exploration program. In 2014, she visited Pakistan, Rio de Janeiro, and Bahia, inspiring young women from unprivileged communities to study sciences and engineering. She was a keynote speaker at SIGGRAPH 2016 and visited Bosnia and Herzegovina in the same year, touring the country with the United States Department of State. She gave a TEDx talk at Beacon Street in 2017, which was later chosen by Wired as one of the best science talks. "What time is it on Mars?" has been viewed almost two million times. She visited Kuwait in 2018, discussing their 2021 Mars mission.
