= Karl Heimburg =

German-American engineer and director of the Test Division at MSFC

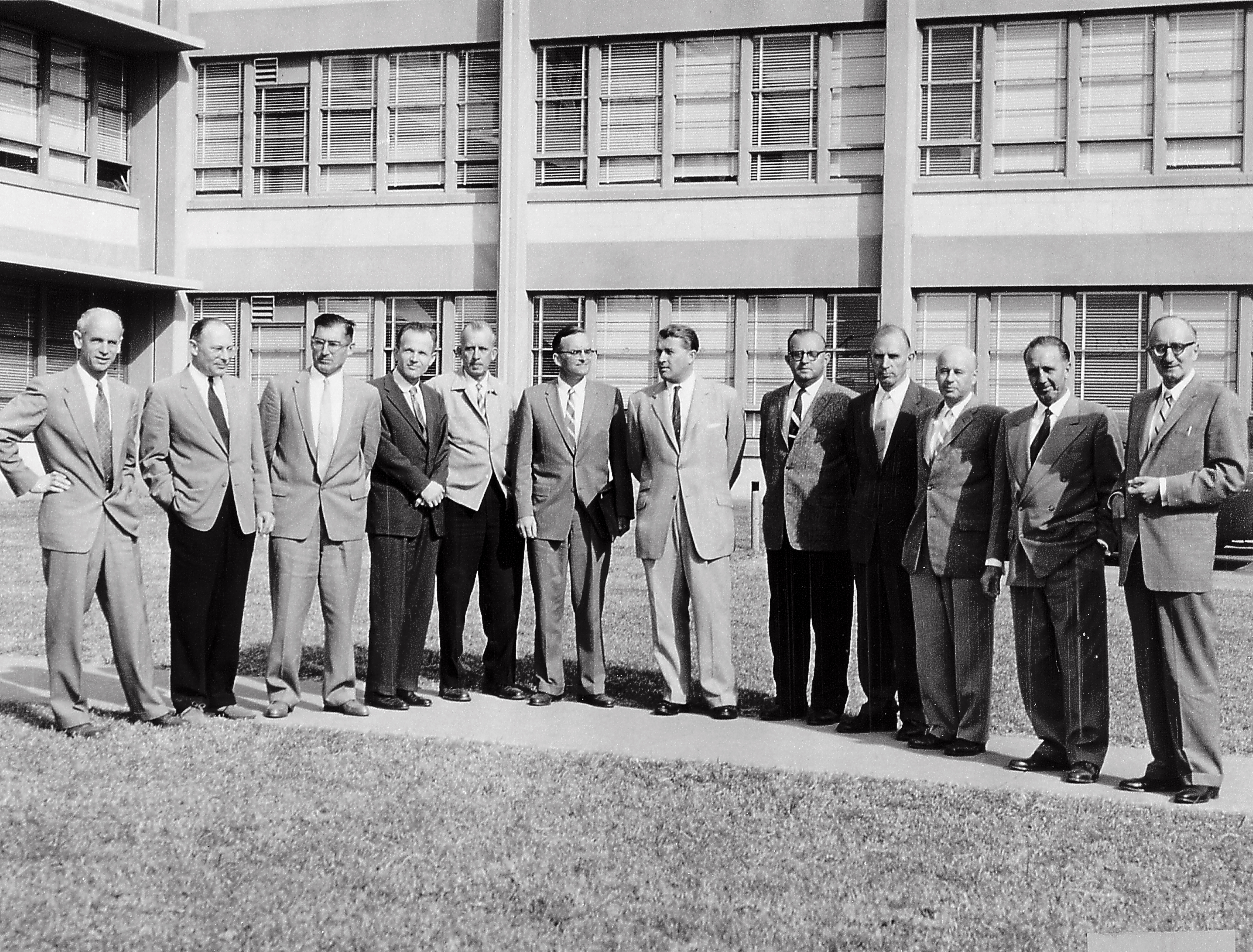
- Karl L. Heimburg (third from the left) as the Director of the Test Laboratory. He is photographed with eleven other scientific specialists of the Peenemünde team who joined the George C. Marshall Space Flight Center (MSFC), NASA
- Born: Karl Ludwig Heimburg; January 29, 1910; Lindenfels, Germany
- Died: January 26, 1997 (aged 86); Huntsville, Alabama, U.S.
- Education: Technische Universität Darmstadt, Darmstadt (1935)
- Known for: MSFC Test Division director
- Spouse: Ruth Inga Holtz
- Children: 3

Karl Ludwig Heimburg (January 29, 1910 - January 26, 1997) was a German-American engineer and Operation Paperclip hire. Heimburg was a member of the "von Braun rocket team" and served as the initial director of the Test Division at the Marshall Space Flight Center.

== Biography ==
Heimburg was born January 29, 1910, in Lindenfels, Germany. In the fall of 1928, after seven months of required practical work at a steel plant in Krefeld, he entered the Technische Universität Darmstadt, where he graduated in 1935 with an engineering degree. Heimburg worked briefly that year at a coal mine, but in 1936, while intoxicated, he made comments in public on his critical regard for Adolf Hitler. Facing investigation by the German police, he traveled through the Soviet Union in 1937 to reach Japan and began work in Tokyo.

Heimburg returned to Germany in 1941, where he was promptly drafted by the army and assigned to the Peenemünde Army Research Center. There he worked under Ludwig Roth on the A7 rocket; after the project's cancellation, he worked on a series of test stands including Test Stand VII, the main test facility for the V-2 rocket. Following bombings on Peenemünde in 1943, he moved to Lehesten, where he worked on testing production V-2 engines.

After World War II, Heimburg was scouted through Operation Paperclip. He joined the initial group of scientists and engineers to travel to the U.S., arriving December 6, 1945. After first working with the rocket team at Fort Bliss and White Sands, in 1960 he became one of the charter members of the new Marshall Space Flight Center. Wernher von Braun selected Heimburg as the director of the center's Test Division. In January 1969, Heimburg was awarded the NASA Exceptional Service Medal for his work on the Apollo 8 mission.
