= Alfred Gessow =

American aerospace engineer (1922–2002)

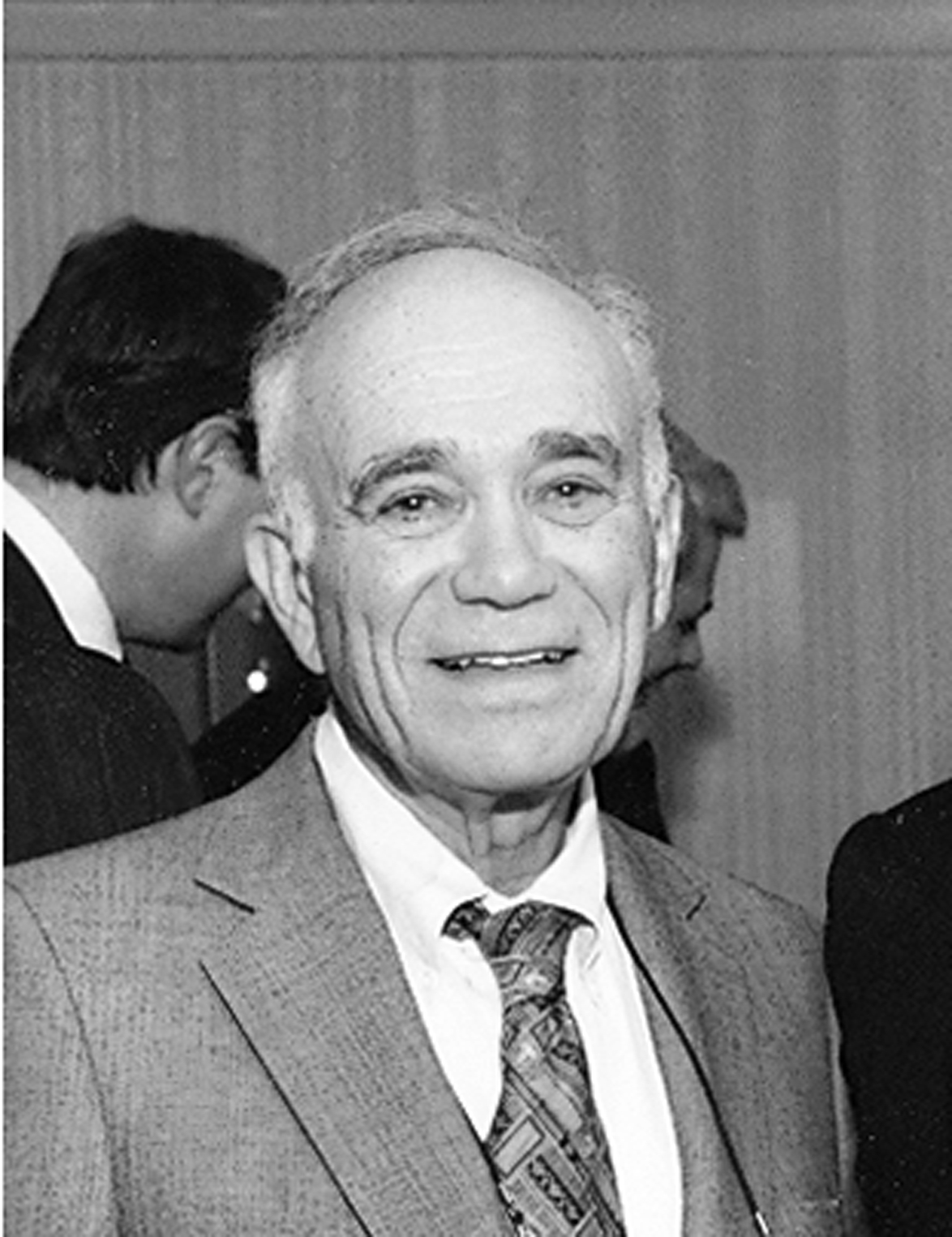
- Born: October 13, 1922; Jersey City, New Jersey
- Died: May 2, 2002 (aged 79); Birmingham, Alabama
- Education: City College of New York (BS); New York University (MS)
- Known for: Pioneering contributions to helicopter and rotorcraft engineering
- Awards: NASA Exceptional Service Medal (1974), AHS Honorary Fellow (1978), AIAA Fellow (1986), Alexander Klemin Award (1996)
- Scientific career
- Fields: Aerospace Engineering
- Workplaces: University of Maryland, NASA, NACA, Langley Research Center, University of Virginia

Prof. Alfred Gessow (October 13, 1922 – May 2, 2002) was an American pioneer in the field of helicopter aerodynamics and aerospace engineering. He was a co-author of the early rotorcraft engineering text Aerodynamics of the Helicopter, which, although published in 1952, has been in print for more than 50 years. Gessow was chair of the Department of Aerospace Engineering at the University of Maryland, College Park, and was ultimately promoted to professor emeritus.

== Researcher ==
While Gessow is best known for his book Aerodynamics of the Helicopter, his earliest published technical papers and reports helped bring a new level of clarity to the development of the helicopter, which prior to then had relatively primitive standards for flying qualities. For example, Gessow authored one of the earliest efforts to standardize mathematical symbology in helicopter aeromechanics to enable aerospace engineers to more easily communicate advances in the field.

One of Gessow's earliest theoretical papers was on the subject of blade twist and plan-form effects, and how it affected the fundamental performance of a hovering helicopter. While it is now established that numerical techniques became the basis of methods in early use by the helicopter industry, the digital computers in 1956 were very primitive by modern standards. His approach lays down the well-known "blade element method" incorporating two-dimensional, non-linear sectional airfoil data from tables, a fundamental engineering approach that even today remains the basis for most helicopter rotor design analyses.

In 1967, Gessow published an article in Scientific American on "The Changing Helicopter."

== Educator ==
Gessow devoted much of his government and teaching career to expanding the knowledge of helicopter aerodynamics, developing new theoretical approaches, and conducting flight experiments.

=== University of Virginia (1945-1956) ===
Gessow began his formal career as an educator while assigned to the NASA Langley Research Center, where he also served as Chairman of the Committee on Graduate Studies and as Chairman of the Faculty at University of Virginia's Hampton Roads Graduate Extension Center. During this period, he developed an advanced degree program administered by the University of Virginia for the benefit of personnel working at the Langley Research Center. He organized and taught undergraduate and graduate courses on helicopter and fixed-wing aerodynamics, and also served as a thesis advisor.

=== A lecturer in Helicopter Theory ===
Gessow taught Helicopter Theory in New York University's summer program in the Aerospace Sciences (1966), and subsequently taught graduate courses as an adjunct professor of aerospace engineering (1968-1969). He also taught Helicopter Theory at the Catholic University of America (1970-1971), and also served as an invited professor at the Korean Advanced Institute of Science (1979-1980). Gessow lectured widely on helicopter technology, and delivered lectures at several universities in the United States including Princeton University, Cornell University, Penn State University, Georgia Tech, Colorado State University, Brooklyn Polytechnic, Virginia Polytechnic, and the Catholic University. He also lectured at international universities including the University of Aachen (Germany), the Technion (Israel), and the Korean Advanced Institute of Sciences (South Korea).

=== University of Maryland (1980-2002) ===
Gessow joined the University of Maryland in 1980 as the chair of the Department of Aerospace Engineering. He served in this capacity from 1980 through 1988. During his tenure as chair, his leadership was instrumental in expanding the department's research and educational programs into a wide range of fields in aeronautical and astronautical engineering including: rotorcraft; space systems; flight dynamics and control; flight structures; and hypersonic vehicles. In 1981, Gessow founded the Center for Rotorcraft Education and Research, and continued as its director until 1992, when he became professor emeritus. In 1997, the center that Gessow founded was renamed the Alfred Gessow Rotorcraft Center to honor his extensive contributions to both the field of rotorcraft and to the University of Maryland. Today, the Alfred Gessow Rotorcraft Center is internationally recognized for its continuing mission of fostering both research and education in the field of vertical flight.

== Honors ==
Gessow was the recipient of numerous major awards in the field of aerospace engineering.

Gessow was recognized with the NASA Exceptional Service Medal in 1974, the citation for which read "for significant contributions to helicopter development, and for effective and innovative planning and management of aerodynamic research activities that have contributed significantly to NASA's stature in aeronautics."

Gessow was awarded Honorary Fellow of the American Helicopter Society in 1978, and the citation stated that Gessow was recognized "For outstanding rotary-wing contributions including inspirational teaching and writing, applying computer technology to rotor blade aerodynamics, and leadership in helicopter airfoil development."

Gessow was awarded the Fifth AHS Alexander A. Nikolsky Honorary Lectureship in 1985. This honorary lectureship is bestowed on an individual who has had "a highly distinguished career in vertical flight aircraft research and development, and is skilled at communicating their technical knowledge and experience, for whom a summary of their original work represents a valuable reference publication." Gessow's lecture was entitled "Understanding and Predicting Helicopter Behavior — Then and Now."

Gessow was the recipient of the AHS Alexander Klemin Award (1996). The Alexander Klemin Award is the highest and most prestigious honor bestowed by AHS International on an individual for lifetime achievement in the field of vertical take-off and landing aircraft.

Gessow was awarded Fellow of the American Institute of Aeronautics and Astronautics in 1982.

== Legacy ==
Gessow was the founding editor of the Journal of the American Helicopter Society, published by AHS International, and served as editor for one year as was the custom of the time. The journal was established in 1956 to provide a forum in which original technical papers dealing with the theory and practice of vertical flight could be peer-reviewed and archived. The journal fosters the exchange of information about innovation and practical information of various aspects of helicopters and V/STOL aircraft. The Journal of the American Helicopter Society celebrated its 50th year of publication in 2006, and reprinted its first issue to commemorate the occasion, and has continued publication to this day.

Every year, the American Helicopter Society International, the world's only international technical society for engineers, scientists and others working on vertical flight technology, awards its Alfred Gessow Award for Best Paper in honor of Gessow, at their annual forum in recognition of the best technical paper presented that year. According to AHS, the award recognizes the author(s) who prepared and presented the most significant forum technical paper as judged and selected by peers.

The University of Maryland Department of Aerospace Engineering has a professorship named in Gessow's honor: The Alfred Gessow Professor. Distinguished University Professor Inderjit Chopra is the inaugural and current Alfred Gessow Professor.
