= William C. Schneider =

American aerospace engineer

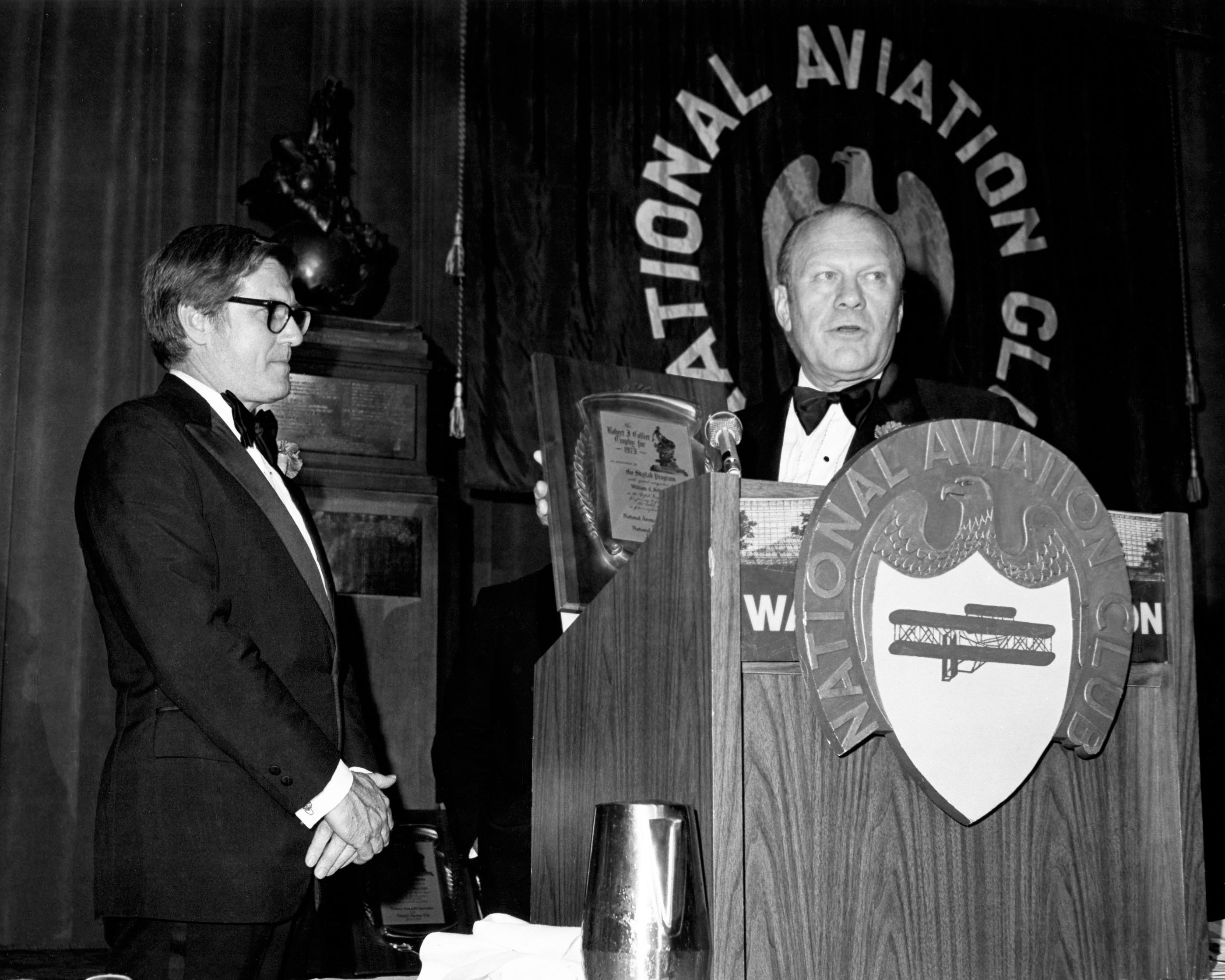
- Vice President Gerald R. Ford presenting the Collier Trophy to Schneider in Washington D.C., 1974
- Born: William Charles Schneider; December 24, 1923; New York City, U.S.
- Died: December 24, 1999 (aged 76)
- Resting place: Arlington National Cemetery
- Education: Catholic University of America
- Occupation: Aerospace engineer
- Employer: NASA
- Known for: Skylab program's director

William Charles Schneider (December 24, 1923 – December 24, 1999) was an American aerospace engineer. He served in the United States Naval Reserve 1942–1946 as an Aviation Machinist's Mate, 1st Class Petty Officer. He joined NASA in June 1963 and served as the Gemini mission director for seven of the ten piloted Gemini missions. From 1967 to 1968, he served as Apollo mission director and the Apollo program's deputy director for missions. He then served from 1968 to 1974 as the Skylab program's director. From 1974 to 1978, he worked as the Deputy Associate Administrator for Space Transportation Systems. From 1978 to 1980, he served as the Associate Administrator for Space Tracking and Data systems. He received a Ph.D. in engineering from Catholic University of America.

== Awards ==
Schneider received the NASA Distinguished Service Medal, NASA's highest award, in 1969.

Gerald Ford presented the 1973 Collier Trophy to Skylab, with special recognition to Schneider and the three crews, "For proving beyond question the value of man in future explorations of space and the production of data of benefit to all the people on Earth."

National Space Club awarded Dr. Schneider the 1974 award in aeronautical engineering.

The American Astronautical Society presented Schneider the 1974 Space Flight Award.
