= Paul D. Lowman =

American geologist (1931–2011)

- Born: September 26, 1931; United States
- Died: September 29, 2011 (aged 80); Bowie, Maryland
- Education: Rutgers University; University of Colorado at Boulder
- Scientific career
- Fields: Geology; Planetary sciences Remote sensing
- Workplaces: United States Army; United States Geological Survey; NASA

Paul D. Lowman (September 21, 1931 – September 29, 2011) was a geophysicist in the Geodynamics Branch of the Laboratory for Terrestrial Physics at the Goddard Space Flight Center (GSFC) in Greenbelt, Maryland. Throughout his long career, he had worked in the fields of comparative planetology, geology, neotectonics, and remote sensing.

== Education ==
Lowman earned his B.S. degree in Geology from Rutgers University in New Brunswick, New Jersey in 1953 and earned his Ph.D. in geology from the University of Colorado at Boulder in 1963.

== Career ==
Lowman was one of the original scientists at the Goddard Space Flight Center. He spent several years with the United States Army Ordnance Corps, and then became a field assistant with the United States Geological Survey. In 1959, he became “the first geologist hired by NASA.” At Goddard, he worked with John A. O'Keefe on the origin of tektites and pre-Apollo lunar geology.

Lowman helped plan the early Apollo missions and later became involved in analyzing lunar samples and interpreting data from the Apollo 15 and Apollo 16 missions. He did early “comparative planetology,” researching what new information from the Moon and Mars could tell us about Earth. He is considered to be the father of Earth orbital photography which led to multispectral imaging of Earth and Landsat satellite imagery.

Lowman's field work included research on ancient exposed rocks in Scotland and the Sudbury Crater in Ontario, Canada. In addition to his scientific achievements, he served in an educational capacity as a faculty member and mentor at a number of universities and programs throughout his long career.

== Awards and honors ==
Lowman received a number of awards and honors during his career, including NASA's Silver Snoopy Award in 1978, 40 Years of Federal Service Award in 1997, GSFC's Exceptional Achievement Award in 2003, and a NASA Exceptional Service Medal in 2003.

== Publications ==
Lowman wrote a number of books and NASA documents including the following titles:

- Lunar Panorama: A Photographic Guide to the Geology of the Moon
- Geologic Applications of Orbital Photography
- The Geologic Evolution of the Moon
- Exploring Space, Exploring Earth: New Understanding of the Earth from Space Research
- Space Panorama, 1.1.1968 - Earth Photographs taken by Astronauts of Mercury and Gemini missions
