= Paul Haney =

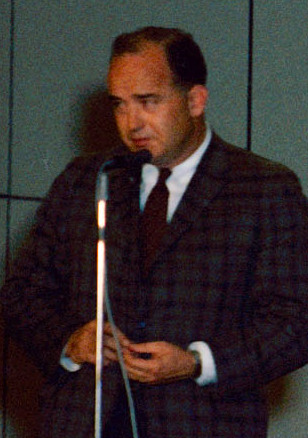
Paul Haney in 1964

Paul P. Haney (July 20, 1928 – January 27, 2009) was an American journalist and public affairs officer for NASA. He was the voice of mission control for the Gemini and Apollo programs.

Haney was born in Akron, Ohio, and attended Kent State University. He served in the United States Navy during the Korean War. He joined NASA in 1958, the year of its founding, and eventually succeeded John A. Powers as the public voice of NASA's crewed spaceflights.

Haney resigned from NASA in 1969, prior to the Apollo 11 Moon landing. He died in Alamogordo, New Mexico, of melanoma which had spread to his brain.
