= Robert O. Aller =

American aerospace engineer (1930-2006)

- Born: March 26, 1930; Dayton, Ohio, U.S.
- Died: May 17, 2006 (aged 76); Lewes, Delaware, U.S.
- Spouse: Nancy Rife (m. 1953)
- Scientific career
- Education: Miami University; United States Naval Academy (BS); University of Michigan (MS)
- Known for: Tracking and Data Relay Satellite System
- Awards: NASA Distinguished Service Medal (1984)

Robert Olen Aller (March 26, 1930 – May 17, 2006) was an American aerospace engineer and civil servant. He oversaw mission planning for Project Gemini and the Apollo program and served as associate administrator for the Tracking and Data Relay System at NASA.

== Early life and education ==
Aller was born in Dayton, Ohio in 1930 to Carolyn R. Lewis and Olen Aller, a World War I veteran. He attended high school at Stivers School for the Arts, where he exceled at mathematics. Aller received the highest grade among juniors in Ohio on the advanced algebra tests before graduating in 1948.

He attended Miami University in Oxford, Ohio before being awarded an appointment to the United States Naval Academy, where he graduated with honors in 1953. He commissioned into the U.S. Air Force, beginning his career as a navigator for Martin B-57 aircraft in France and Germany. While still in the Air Force, Aller began studying at the University of Michigan. He graduated with a master's degree in aeronautics and astronautics in 1960.

== Career ==
After graduating, Aller worked at the Satellite Test Center in Sunnyvale, California before working for Ford Aerospace in Houston. He joined NASA in 1964, where he was appointed chief of mission planning for the Gemini program. He oversaw ten manned missions as part of the program. Aller moved to NASA headquarters in Washington, D.C., where led the operations planning for the Apollo program from 1968 to 1970.

He oversaw the operations for NASA's first experimental space station Skylab from 1971 until its reentry in 1974. Aller went on to serve in senior positions on the Apollo–Soyuz international crew program and NASA's space transportation and satellite data systems projects. He directed NASA's Tracking and Data Relay System (TDRS) division between 1978 and 1983.

The division's first satellite, TDRS-1, was launched by Space Shuttle Challenger on STS-6 in 1983. The inertial upper stage (IUS) experienced a failure during the second geosynchronous orbit burn, resulting in an errant lower orbit. The elliptical orbit prevented a communications link and nominal satellite operations, requiring a perigee raise to circularize. For his role in leading engineers to correct the orbit of the $100 million satellite using brief firings of onboard thrusters over a period of months, NASA awarded him the NASA Distinguished Service Medal in 1984.

Aller became associate administrator for NASA's office of space tracking and data systems in 1983, where he was responsible for global tracking, data, and communication for crewed missions and unmanned spacecraft. He became associate administrator for NASA space operations in 1987.

In 1989, Aller stepped down from NASA in a publicized resignation after new federal ethics rules barred officials from joining companies they had once overseen. He worked as an aerospace consultant before retiring.

Aller died of pulmonary fibrosis at Beebe Medical Center in Lewes, Delaware in 2006, aged 76.

== Personal life ==
Aller played basketball in high school. He and Nancy Rife were Prom king and queen their senior year, and the two married in 1953. They were married for 53 years and had three children. She and Aller lived in Bethesda, Maryland for nearly three decades. He was active in the Lutheran Church and held a leadership position.

In 1993, Aller became a resident of Rehoboth Beach, Delaware, where he lived with his wife until his death.

== Awards and honors ==
- American Astronautical Society (AAS) Space Flight Award (1988)
- NASA Distinguished Service Medal (1984)
