= Bradley Hills Presbyterian Church =

Presbyterian church in Bethesda, Maryland

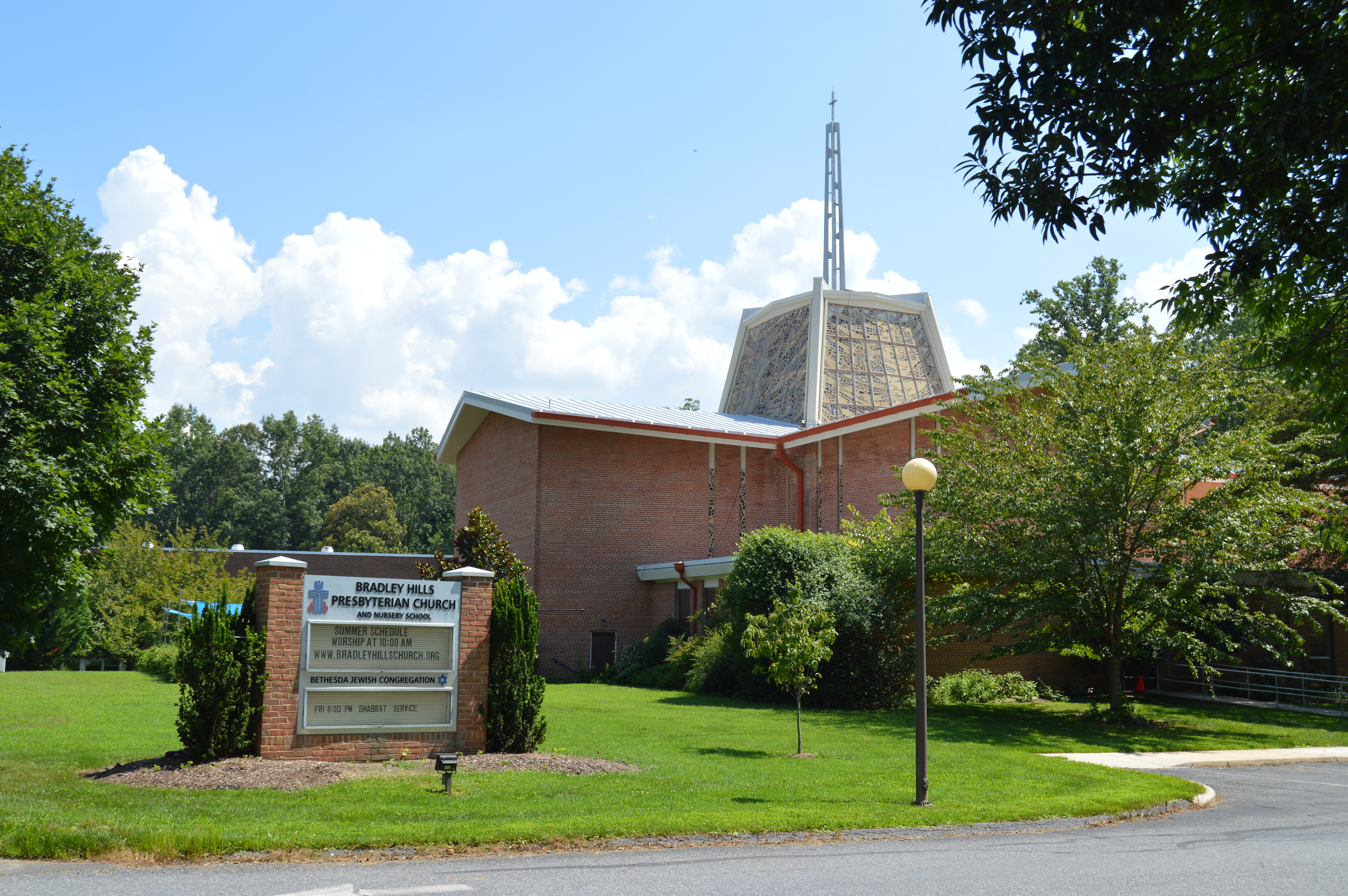
- Bradley Hills Presbyterian Church
- Bradley Hills Presbyterian Church
- 39°00′09″N 77°07′54″W
- Address: 6601 Bradley Boulevard in Bethesda, Maryland 20817
- Country: United States
- Denomination: Presbyterian
- Website: bradleyhillschurch.org

History
- Status: Church
- Founded: Easter 1900

Architecture
- Architectural type: Church
- Completed: 1956

Bethesda Jewish Congregation
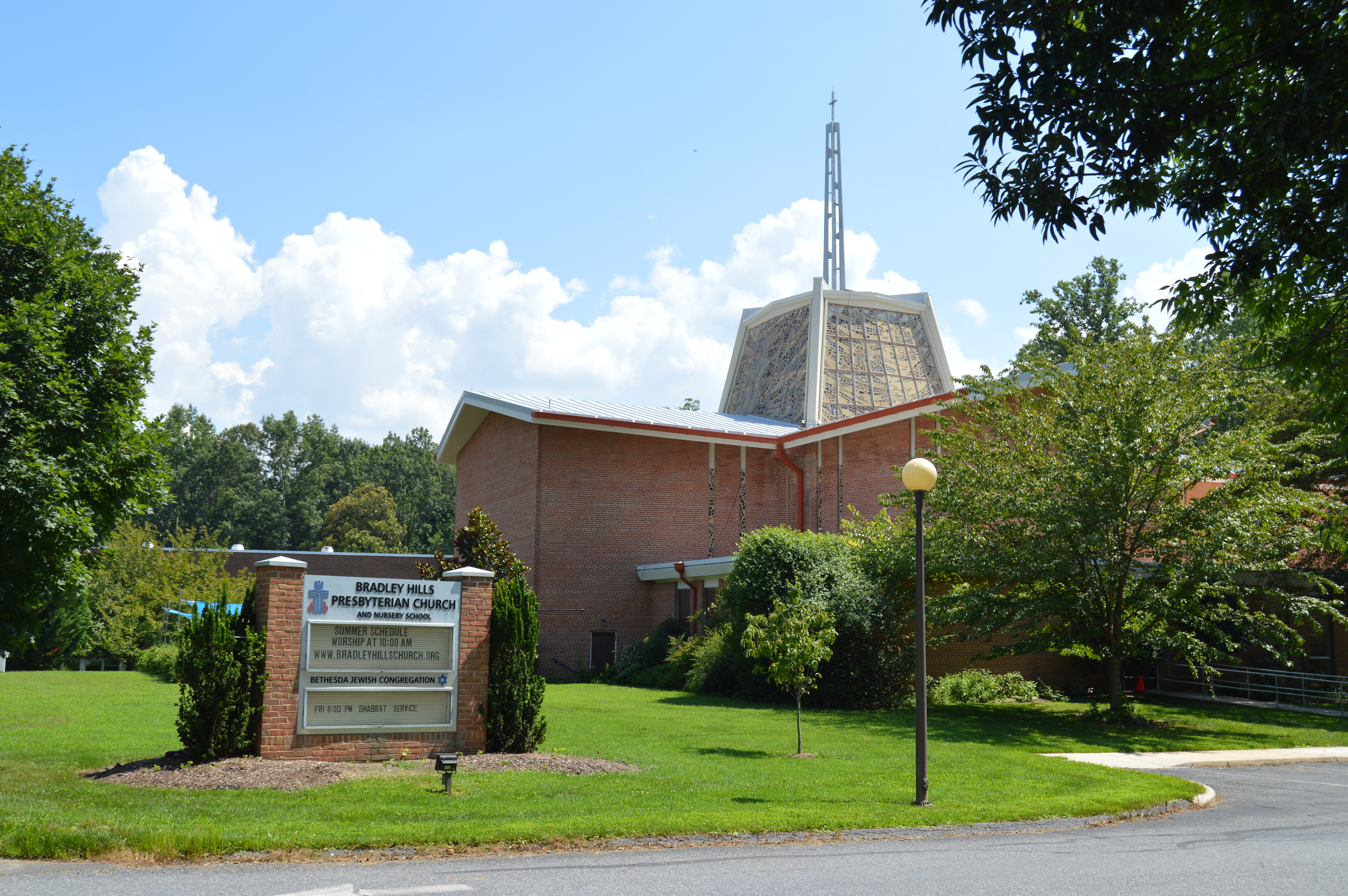

Religion
- Affiliation: Judaism
- Rite: Unaffiliated
- Leadership: Rabbi Eric L. Abbott

Location
- Location: 6601 Bradley Boulevard in Bethesda, Maryland 20817
- Country: United States
- Interactive map of Bethesda Jewish Congregation

Architecture
- Established: 1964 (as a congregation)
- Completed: 1967 (partnership with church)

Website
- bethesdajewish.org

Bradley Hills Presbyterian Church is a Presbyterian church located at 6601 Bradley Boulevard in Bethesda, Maryland, in the United States.

Founded in 1900 in a carriage house in Washington, D.C., initially as a Sunday school, the congregation relocated to Bethesda in 1956. The sanctuary was completed in 1965 and the pipe organ was added in 1972. In 2002, Covenant Hall and a gathering space were completed.

== Bethesda Jewish Congregation ==
The church has a unique partnership with the Bethesda Jewish Congregation, an unaffiliated Jewish congregation and synagogue, in which they share the same space for worship. It is believed that this arrangement, dating from 1967, is the oldest such relationship in the United States. In 1991 the Bethesda Jewish Congregation and Bradley Hills Presbyterian Church signed a pact, renewed as a covenant in November 2003, that reads:

We, the members of Bradley Hills Presbyterian Church and the Bethesda Jewish Congregation, form together this covenant to honor the Intimate and Infinite God of Creation, the One God we both worship. Taking to heart the biblical charge to be a light to the nations, we seek to offer a prophetic vision of interfaith partnership in a pluralistic world. Continuing a relationship begun in 1967, as spiritual siblings sharing sacred space, we commit ourselves to:

- Acknowledge and celebrate our commonalities and differences;
- Foster appreciation for the richness of our respective traditions;
- Encourage curiosity and dialogues between our two communities of faith;
- Bear witness to our faith in cooperative activity in the world;
- Create with each other what we cannot create separately.

Recognizing the word of our great teachers, we commit ourselves to fulfill the Great Commandment: You shall love the Lord your God with all your heart, with all your soul, with all your mind, and with all your might. With deepest gratitude, we pledge to continue to celebrate the light bestowed upon us. May this union of spirit and space spark a flame of respect and understanding throughout the world.

== See also ==
- History of the Jews in Maryland
- Presbyterianism in the United States
