= Space Task Group =

Group of NASA engineers working on the human spaceflight program starting in 1958

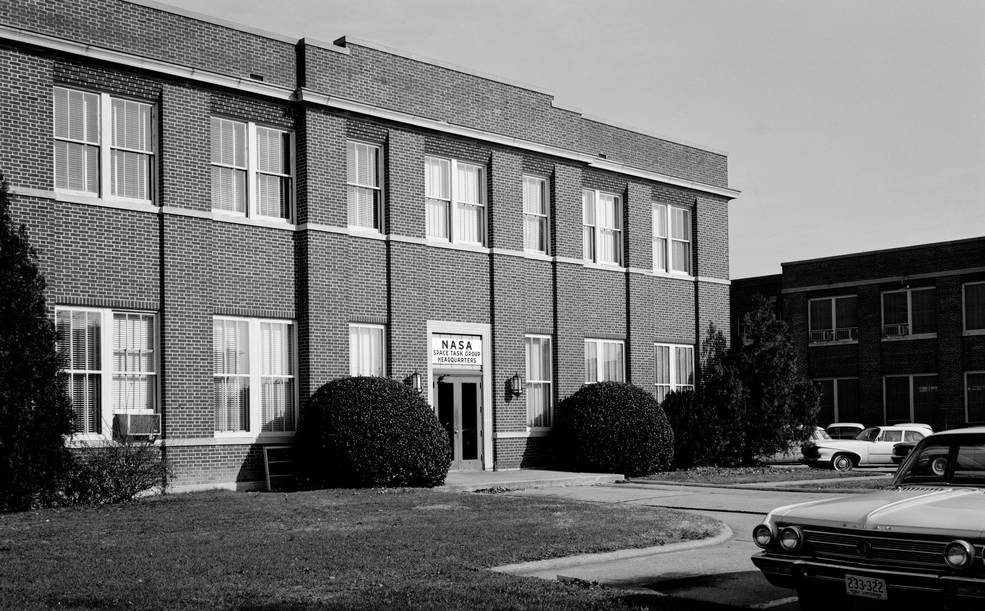
The Headquarters of the Space Task Group (STG) at NASA’s Langley Research Center in Hampton, Virginia

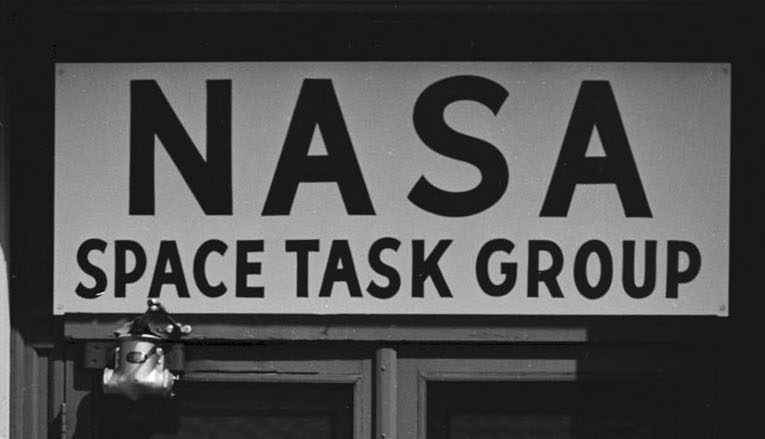
Sign on the Space Task Group building in June 1961

The Space Task Group was a working group of NASA engineers created in 1958, tasked with managing America's human spaceflight programs. Headed by Robert Gilruth and based at the Langley Research Center in Hampton, Virginia, it managed Project Mercury and follow-on plans. After President John F. Kennedy set the goal in 1961 for the Apollo Program to land a man on the Moon and bring him back safely to Earth, NASA decided a much larger organization and a new facility was required to perform the Task Group's function, and it was transformed into the Manned Spacecraft Center (now the Lyndon B. Johnson Space Center), located in Houston, Texas.

In later years, the term Space Task Group was ambiguously reused to refer to an ad hoc committee appointed by the president to recommend human spaceflight programs, usually chaired by the vice president. For instance, President Richard Nixon appointed such a group in February 1969 to outline a post-Apollo spaceflight strategy, chaired by Vice President Spiro T. Agnew.

== History ==
Created on November 5, 1958, the Space Task Group was headed by Robert Gilruth. Originally it consisted of 45 people, including eight secretaries and "computers", the occupational title for women who ran calculations on mechanical adding machines. Of its 37 engineers, 27 were from Langley Research Center, and 10 had been assigned from Lewis Research Center in Cleveland, Ohio. Original members of the group included Charles Donlan, Gilruth's deputy; Max Faget, head of engineering; Chuck Mathews, head of flight operations; Chris Kraft, also in flight operations; and Glynn Lunney, who at 21 was the youngest member of the group. The head of the public affairs office was John "Shorty" Powers.

In 1959, the group was expanded by the addition of 32 engineers from Canada, who had been left without jobs when the Avro Arrow project was cancelled. These new engineers included Jim Chamberlin, George Harris, John Hodge, Owen Maynard, Bryan Erb, Rodney Rose, and Tecwyn Roberts.

After President John F. Kennedy set the national goal on May 25, 1961, of landing a man on the Moon by the end of the 1960s and bringing him back to Earth, it became clear to NASA administrator James E. Webb that Gilruth would need a much larger organization and facilities, in fact a new dedicated NASA center, to administer US human spaceflight programs. Webb got the approval of Kennedy, and the Congress, and in August 1961 appointed a team to select a site for the new center. On September 19, Webb announced the new Manned Spacecraft Center (MSC) would be built on a Houston, Texas, site donated by Rice University. Gilruth immediately began the transition of his Task Group into the new MSC, planning his increased staff organization and its move to Houston, using temporary leased office and test facility space on 12 sites while the new facility was being built. By September 1962, his organization was moved to Houston and construction had begun, effectively marking the end of the Task Group. The MSC facility was completed in September 1963.

== Reuse of the name ==
The National Aeronautics and Space Act of 1958, which established NASA, also directed the president of the United States to chair a National Aeronautics and Space Council (later the National Space Council), including the secretaries of state and defense, the NASA Administrator, the Chairman of the Atomic Energy Commission, and any additional members that the president chose to appoint. This council was tasked with making recommendations on the direction of the US civilian and military space programs. Occasionally this council was referred to as a "Space Task Group". President John F. Kennedy persuaded Congress to modify the law to give him the authority to appoint the vice president to chair the council in his place. As the Apollo program reached its climax in 1969, President Richard M. Nixon directed Vice President Spiro T. Agnew's "Space Task Group" to recommend a future direction of the US human spaceflight program. Agnew enthusiastically supported an ambitious Space Transportation System program including reusable spacecraft, permanent Earth and Lunar stations, and human flight to Mars. However, Nixon knew the mood in the US Congress would not continue to sustain funding at the level of Apollo, and cut these plans back to only the development of the Space Shuttle, with possible eventual establishment of an Earth orbital space station.
