= Robert R. Gilruth =

American aerospace engineer (1913–2000)

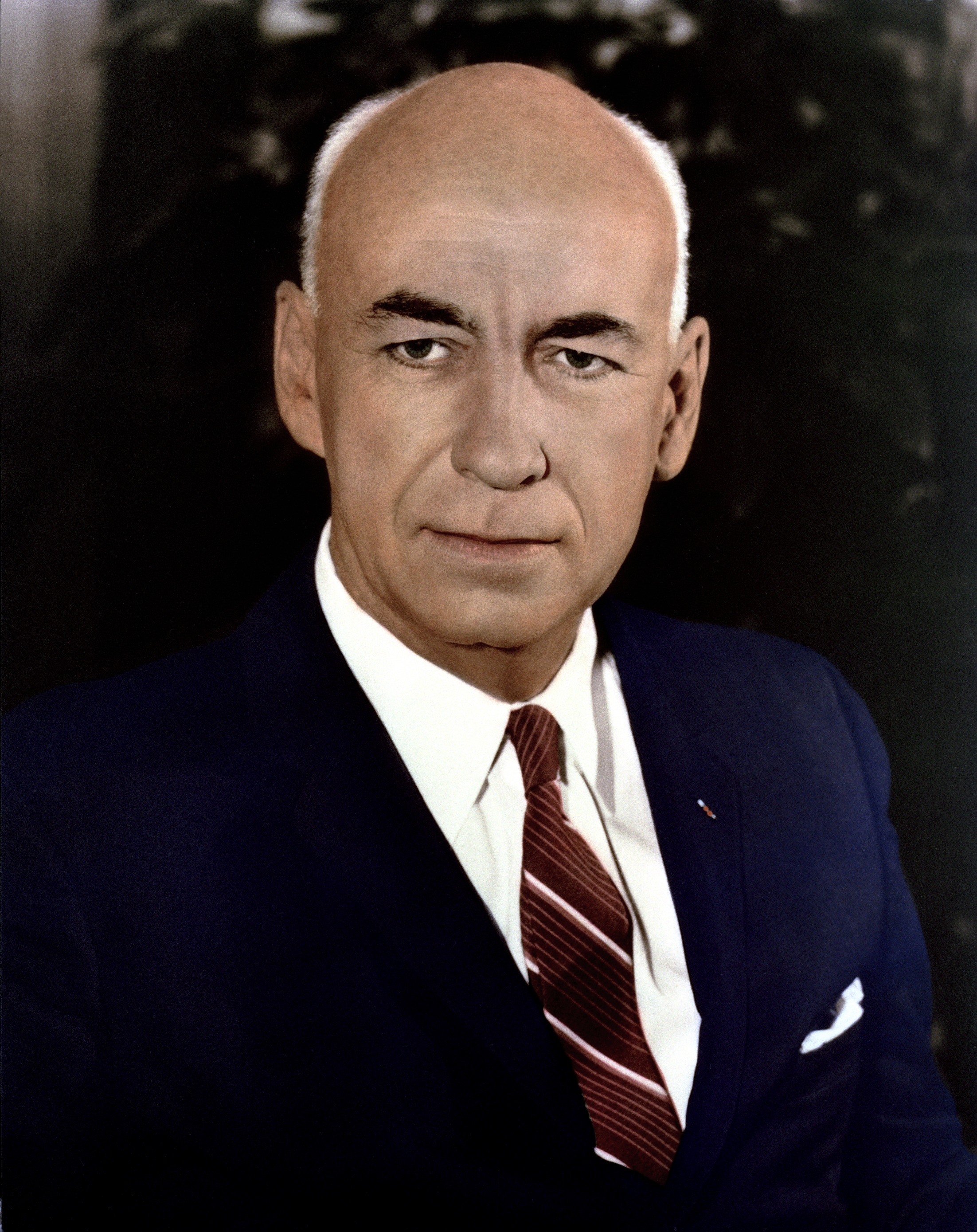
- Gilruth at NASA, 1965
- Born: Robert Rowe Gilruth; October 8, 1913; Nashwauk, Minnesota, U.S.
- Died: August 17, 2000 (aged 86); Charlottesville, Virginia, U.S.
- Education: University of Minnesota, B.S. 1935, M.S. 1936
- Occupations: Director of NASA Manned Spacecraft Center, now Lyndon B. Johnson Space Center
- Awards: President's Award for Distinguished Federal Civilian Service (1962); ASME Medal (1970)

Robert Rowe Gilruth (October 8, 1913 – August 17, 2000) was an American aerospace engineer and an aviation/space pioneer who was the first director of NASA's Manned Spacecraft Center, later renamed the Lyndon B. Johnson Space Center.

He worked for the National Advisory Committee for Aeronautics (NACA) from 1937 to 1958 and its successor NASA, until his retirement in 1973. He was involved with early research into supersonic flight and rocket-powered aircraft, and then with the United States human spaceflight program, including the Mercury, Gemini, and Apollo programs.

== Biography ==
=== Early life ===
Gilruth was born October 8, 1913, in Nashwauk, Minnesota, and moved to Duluth when he was nine years old. He graduated in 1931 from Duluth Central High School. As a teenager, Gilruth was fascinated by aeronautics and spent time building model airplanes. He was inspired to pursue a career in the field after reading about NASA's Langley Memorial Aeronautical Laboratory in Virginia. Gilruth received a Bachelor of Science degree in Aeronautical Engineering at the University of Minnesota in 1935, and received his Master of Science degree in 1936. While there he was a member of the Professional Engineering Fraternity Theta Tau, of which he was later inducted as a Hall of Fame Alumnus.

=== Flight test career ===
In January 1937 Gilruth was hired at NACA's Langley Memorial Aeronautical Laboratory, where he performed flight research. His research led to the NACA Report R755, Requirements for Satisfactory Flying Qualities of an Airplane, published in 1941, in which he defined a set of requirements for the handling characteristics of an aircraft. Until this point, no set of guidelines for pilots and aircraft designers existed.

Gilruth also pioneered the recording of data from instruments during flight test, to be later correlated with the pilot's experience. This would go on to become the standard operating procedure.

=== NASA career ===
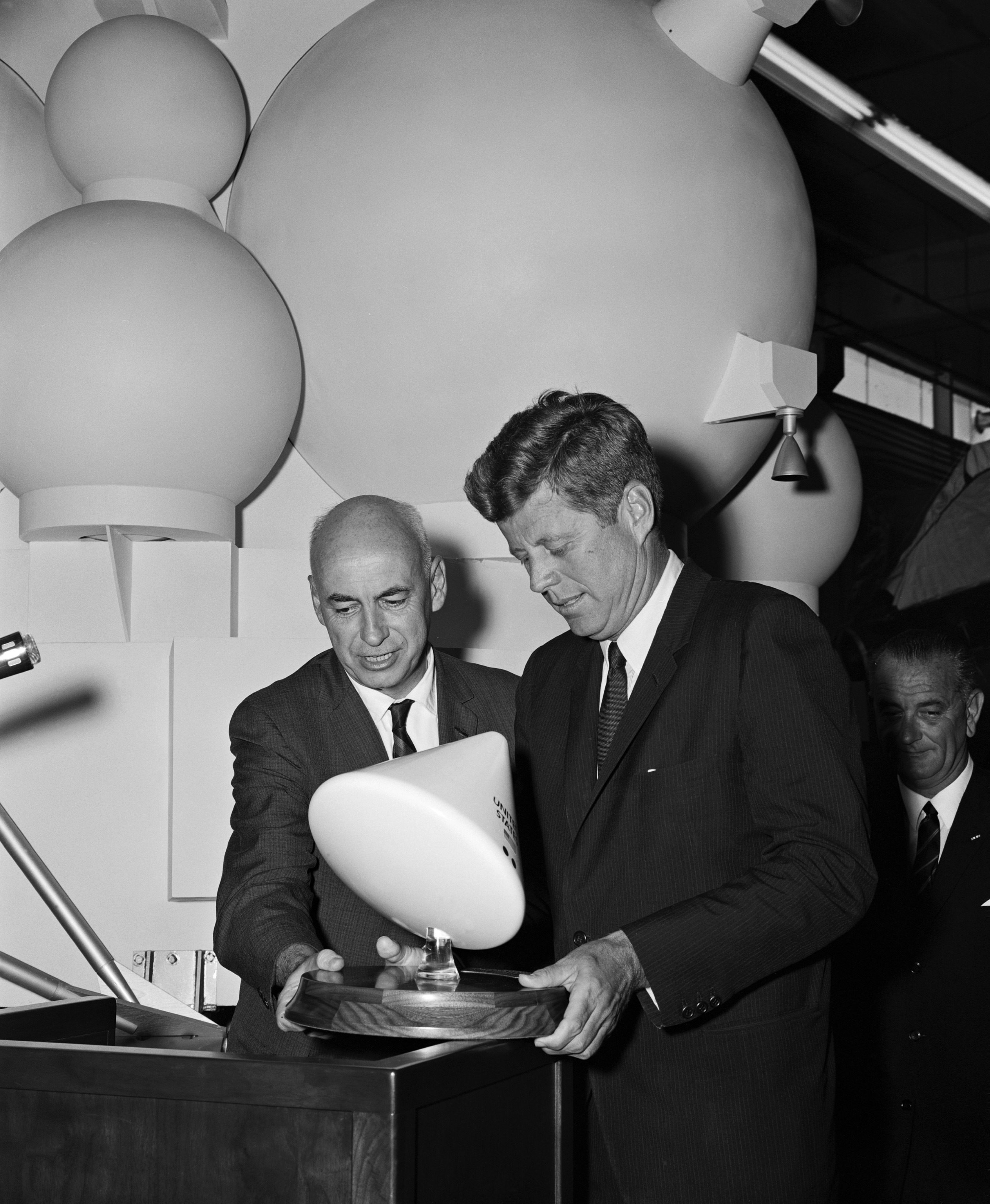
Gilruth presents President John F. Kennedy with a mounted model of the Apollo spacecraft in 1962

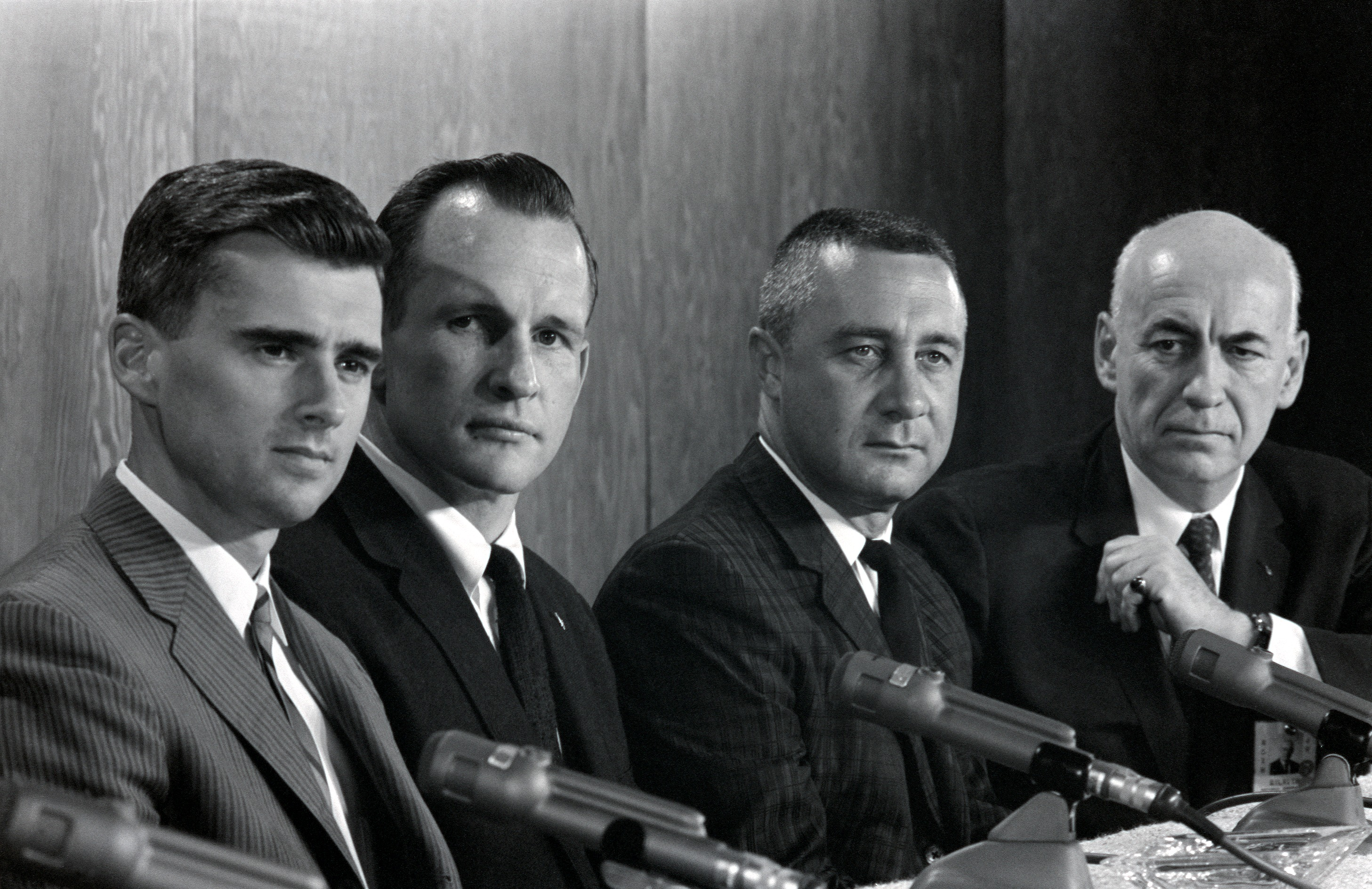
Gilruth (far right) introduces the Apollo 1 crew during a press conference in Houston. From the left are astronauts Roger Chaffee, Ed White and Gus Grissom, 1966.

Gilruth had been working on hypersonic missile rockets as the assistant director of the Pilotless Aircraft Research Division of NACA. He and his team pushed their superiors to pursue a program to launch satellites into space, but he was rebuffed by administrators. The dynamic quickly changed after the Soviets succeeded in launching Sputnik, and Gilruth became involved in the transition of NACA into NASA.

When NASA was created, Gilruth became head of the Space Task Group, tasked with putting a man in space before the Soviet Union.

In 1961, when President John F. Kennedy announced that America would put a man on the Moon before the end of the decade (the 1960s) and bring him back safely to Earth, Gilruth was "aghast" and unsure that such a goal could be accomplished. He was integral to the creation of the Gemini program, which he advocated as a means for NASA to learn more about operating in space before attempting a lunar landing.

In 1962, he was awarded the President's Award for Distinguished Federal Civilian Service by President John F. Kennedy.

Soon the Apollo program was born, and Gilruth was made head of the NASA center which ran it, the new Manned Spacecraft Center (MSC) (now the Johnson Space Center). Gilruth was inducted into the National Space Hall of Fame in 1969 and served as director of the MSC until his retirement in 1972. He was inducted as a member of the inaugural class to the International Space Hall of Fame in 1976. He oversaw a total of 25 crewed space flights, from Mercury-Redstone 3 to Apollo 15.

In 1971, Gilruth, along with the Apollo 15 crew, was awarded the Collier Trophy.

In 1992, Gilruth was inducted into the International Air & Space Hall of Fame at the San Diego Air & Space Museum, in 1994, he was inducted into the National Aviation Hall of Fame and in 2015, the Minnesota Aviation Hall of Fame as a posthumous induction.

=== Death ===
In 2000, Gilruth died in Charlottesville, Virginia, at the age of 86.

== Portrayals in dramas ==
- Apollo 11: by William Mesnik.
- From the Earth to the Moon: by John Carroll Lynch.
- Hidden Figures: Kevin Costner's Al Harrison was mainly based on Gilruth.
- First Man: by Ciarán Hinds.
- The Right Stuff: by Patrick Fischler
