= Launch pad =

Facility from which rockets are launched

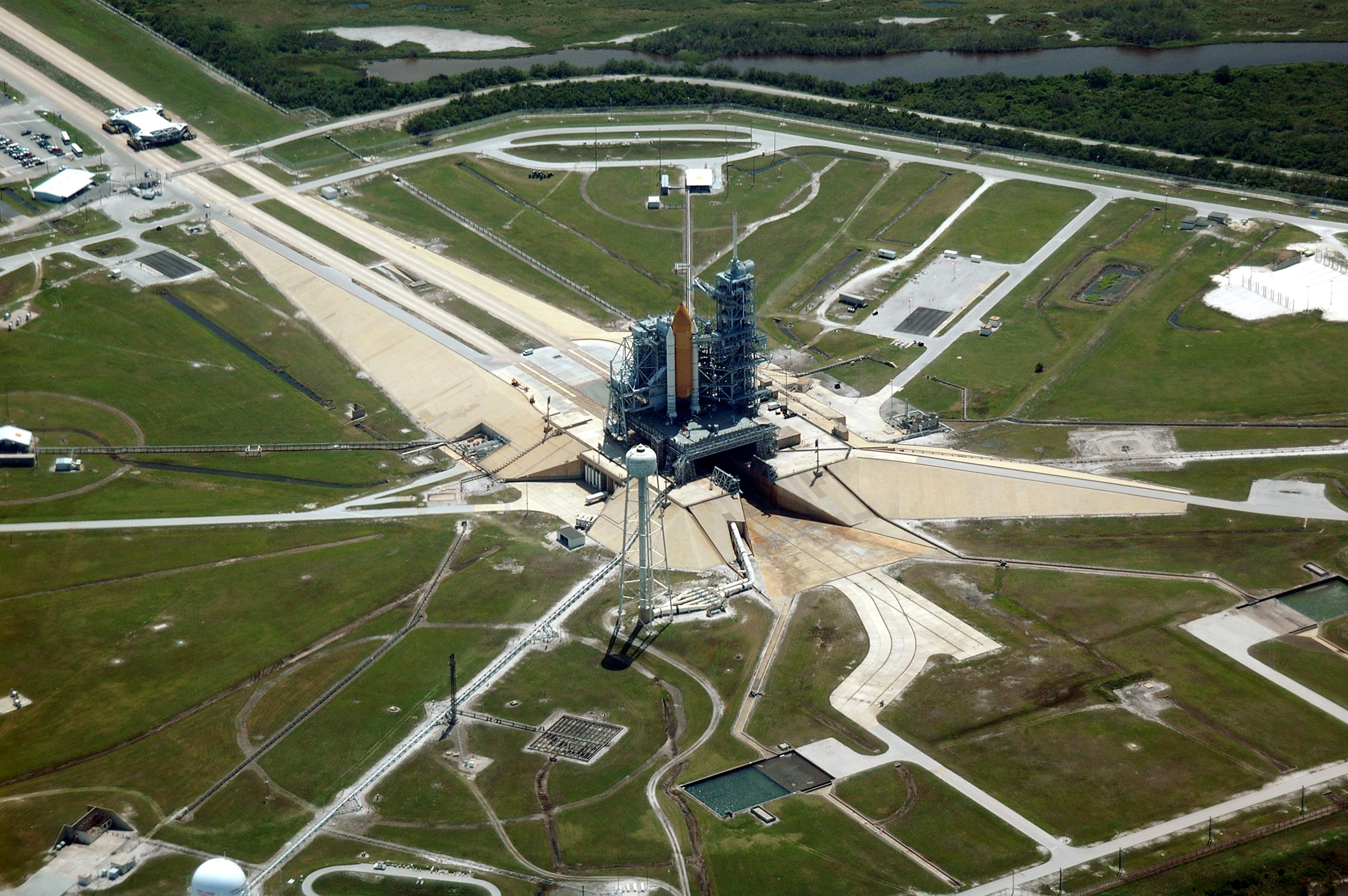
Launch pad at Kennedy Space Center Launch Complex 39B on Merritt Island, Florida

A launch pad is an above-ground facility from which a rocket-powered missile or space vehicle is vertically launched. The term launch pad can be used to describe just the central launch platform (mobile launcher platform), or the entire complex (launch complex). The entire complex will include a launch mount or launch platform to physically support the vehicle, a service structure with umbilicals, and the infrastructure required to provide propellants, cryogenic fluids, electrical power, communications, telemetry, rocket assembly, payload processing, storage facilities for propellants and gases, equipment, access roads, and drainage.

Most launch pads include fixed service structures to provide one or more access platforms to assemble, inspect, and maintain the vehicle and to allow access to the spacecraft, including the loading of crew. The pad may contain a flame deflection structure to prevent the intense heat of the rocket exhaust from damaging the vehicle or pad structures, and a sound suppression system spraying large quantities of water may be employed. The pad may also be protected by lightning arresters. A spaceport typically includes multiple launch complexes and other supporting infrastructure.

A launch pad is distinct from a missile launch facility (or missile silo or missile complex), which also launches a missile vertically but is located underground in order to help harden it against enemy attack.

The launch complex for liquid fueled rockets often has extensive ground support equipment including propellant tanks and plumbing to fill the rocket before launch. Cryogenic propellants (liquid oxygen oxidizer, and liquid hydrogen or liquid methane fuel) need to be continuously topped off (i.e., boil-off replaced) during the launch sequence (countdown), as the vehicle awaits liftoff. This becomes particularly important as complex sequences may be interrupted by planned or unplanned holds to fix problems.

Most rockets need to be supported and held down for a few seconds after ignition while the engines build up to full thrust. The vehicle is commonly held on the pad by hold-down arms or explosive bolts, which are triggered when the vehicle is stable and ready to fly, at which point all umbilical connections with the pad are released.

== History ==
Precursors to modern rocketry, such as fireworks and rocket launchers, did not generally require dedicated launch pads. This was due in part to their relatively portable size, as well as the sufficiency of their casings in sustaining stresses. One of the first pads for a liquid-fueled rocket, what would later be named the Goddard Rocket Launching Site after Robert H. Goddard's series of launch tests starting in 1926, consisted of a mount situated on an open field in rural Massachusetts. The mount consisted of a frame with a series of gasoline and liquid oxygen lines feeding into the rocket.

It wasn't until the 1930s that rockets were increasing enough in size and strength that specialized launch facilities became necessary. The Verein für Raumschiffahrt in Germany was permitted after a request for funding in 1930 to move from farms to the Berlin rocket launching site (German: Raketenflugplatz Berlin), a repurposed ammunition dump.

A test stand was built for liquid-propellant rockets in Kummersdorf in 1932, where the early designs from the Aggregat series of ballistic missiles were afterwards developed. This site was also the location of the first casualties in rocket development, when Dr. Wahmke and 2 assistants were killed, and another assistant was injured. A propellant fuel tank exploded, while experimenting with mixing 90% hydrogen peroxide and alcohol, before combustion.

In May 1937, Dornberger, and most of his staff, moved to the Peenemünde Army Research Center on the island of Usedom on the Baltic coast which offered much greater space and secrecy. Dr. Thiel and his staff followed in the summer of 1940. Test Stand VI at Pennemünde was an exact replica to Kummersdorf's large test stand. It was this site which saw the development of the V-2 rocket. Test Stand VII was the principle testing facility at the Peenemünde Airfield and was capable of static firing rocket motors with up to 200 tons of thrust.

Launch pads would increase in complexity over the following decades throughout and following the Space Race. Where large volumes of exhaust gases are expelled during engine testing or vehicle launch, a flame deflector might be implemented to mitigate damage to the surrounding pad and direct exhaust. This is especially important with reusable launch vehicles to increase efficiency of launches while minimizing time spent refurbishing.

== Construction ==
The construction of a launch pad begins with site selection, considering various geographical and logistical factors. It is often advantageous to position the launch pad on the coast, particularly with the ocean to the east, to leverage the Earth's rotation and increase the specific impulse of launches. Space programs such as Soviet space program or the French space program without this luxury may utilize facilities outside of their main territory such as the Baikonur Cosmodrome or Guiana Space Centre to launch for them. This orientation also allows for safe trajectory paths, minimizing risks to populated areas during ascent.

== Facilities ==
=== Transport of rockets to the pad ===
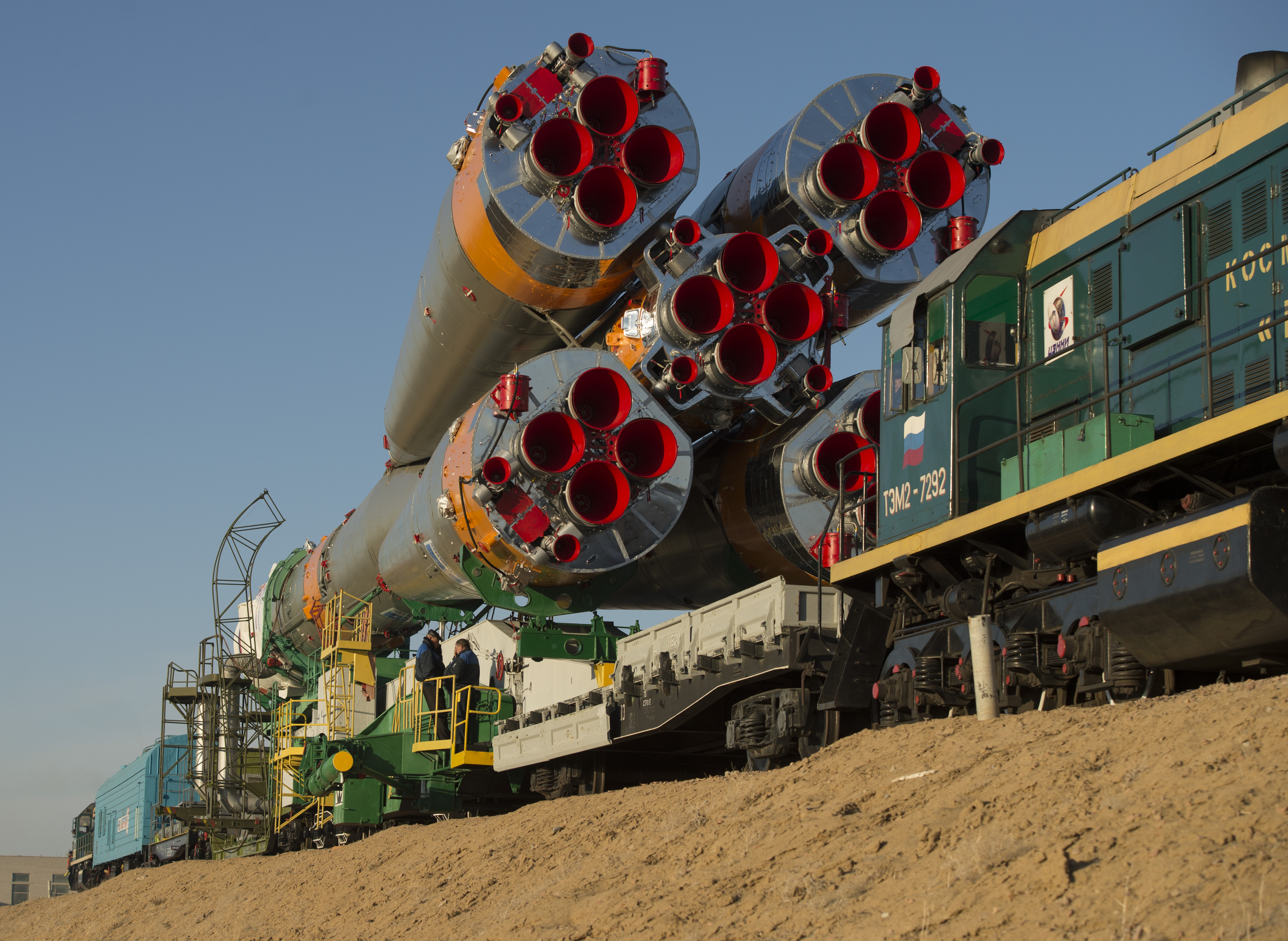
Transport of Soyuz rocket to pad by train

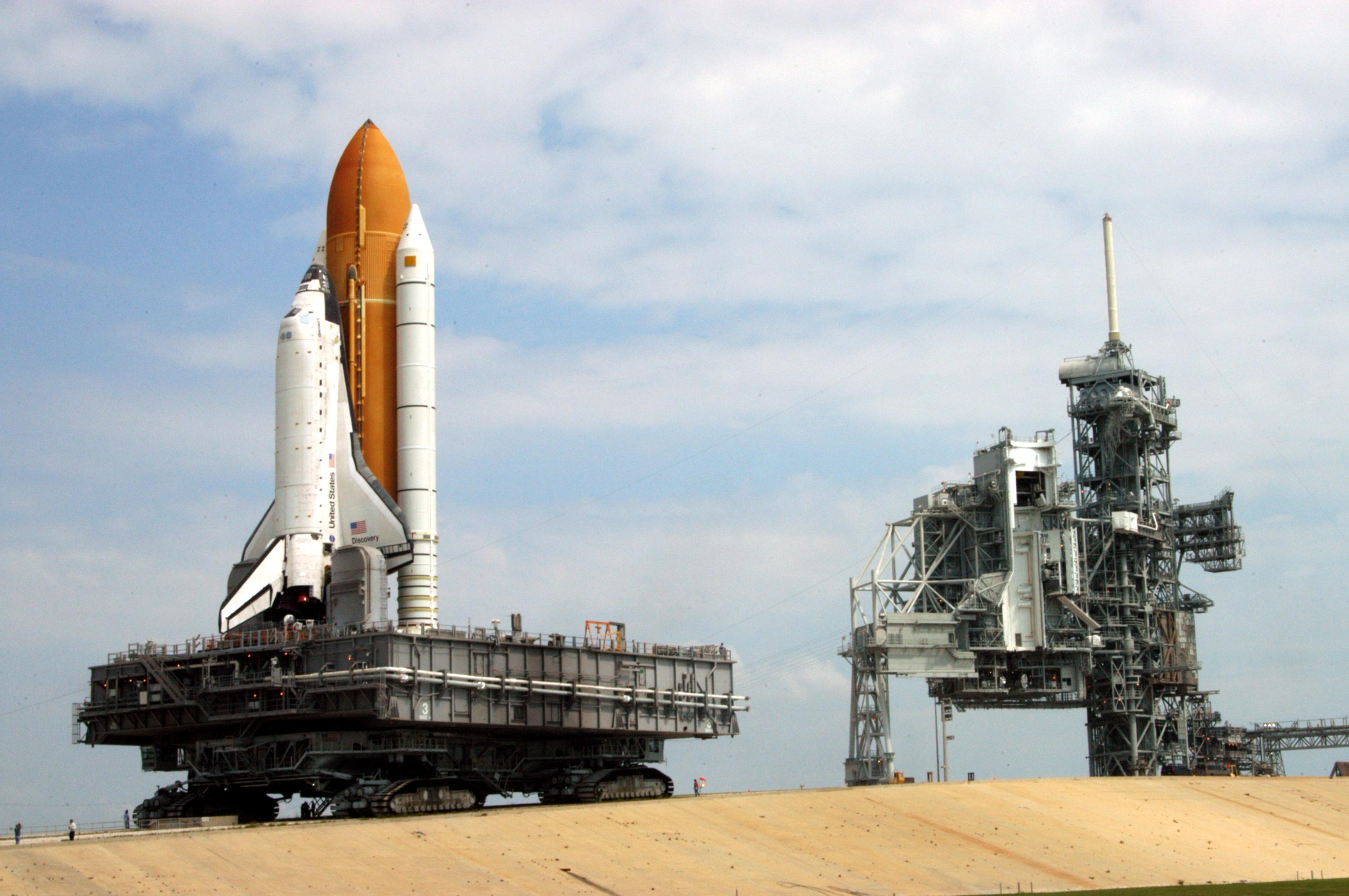
Transport of Space Shuttle and MLP to pad on Crawler-transporter

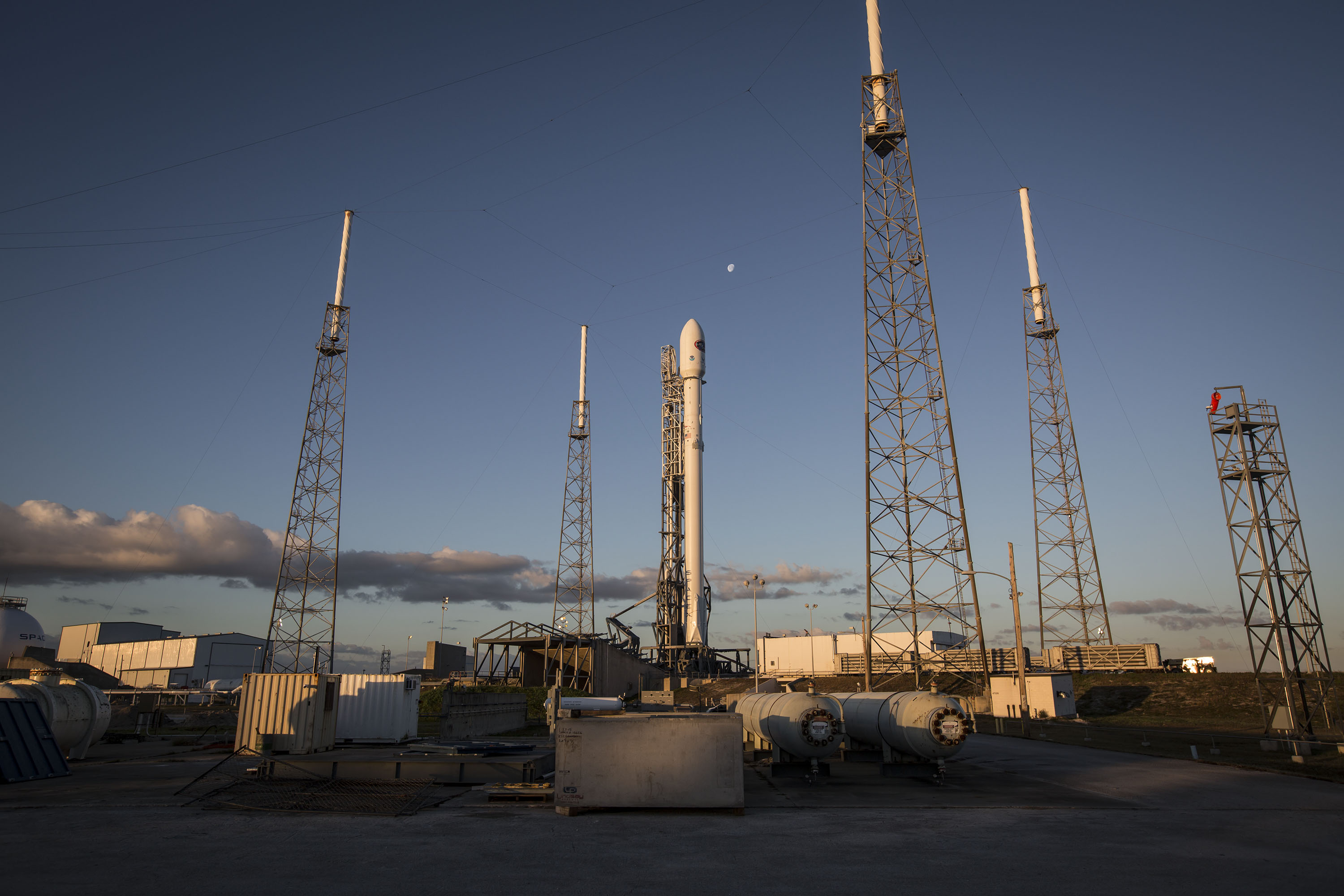
SLC-40 with SpaceX Falcon 9 launch infrastructure. The four towers surrounding the rocket are lightning arresters, and acts like a giant Faraday cage

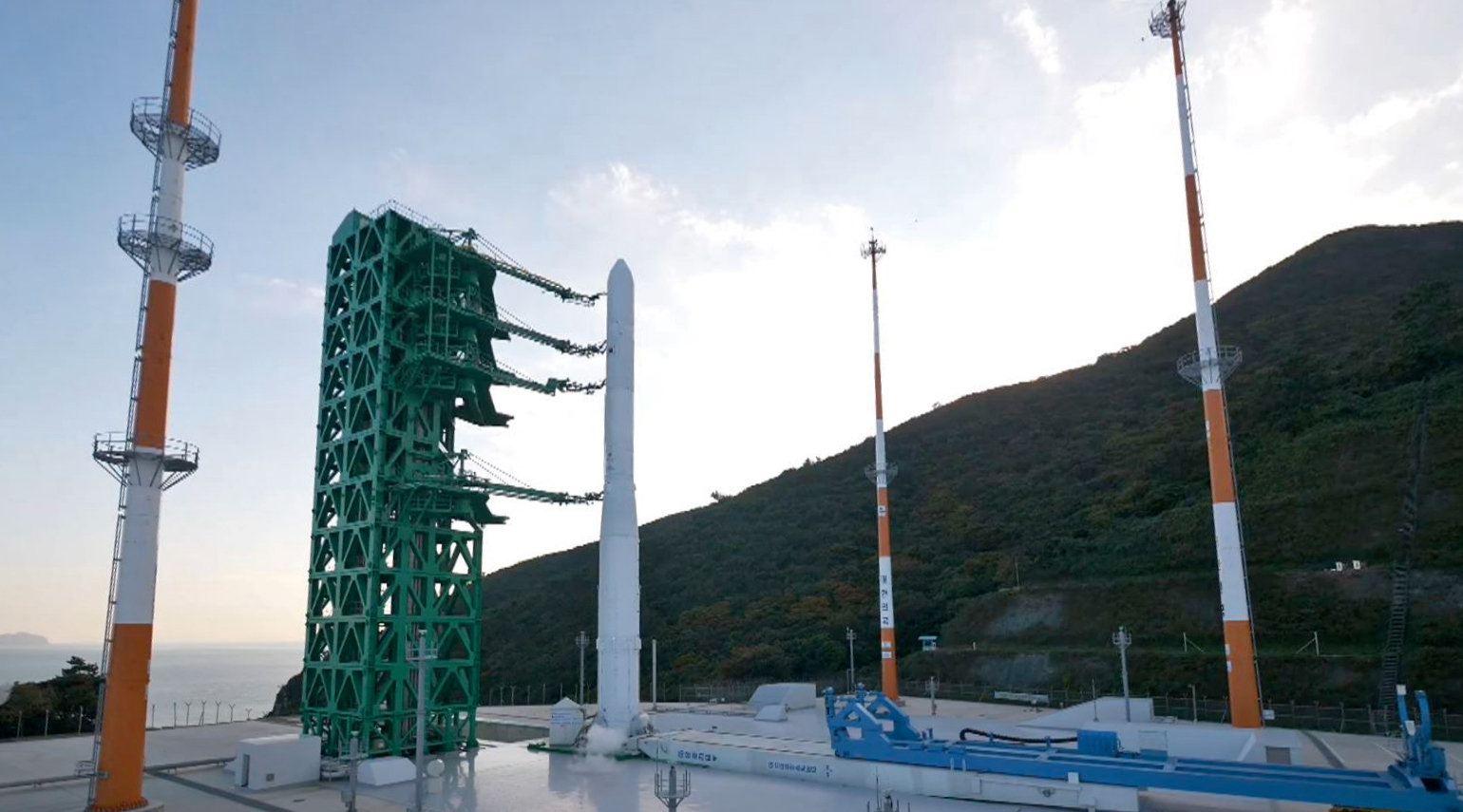
The second launch pad at Naro Space Center in South Korea is a fixed launch tower.

Each launch site is unique, but a few broad types can be described by the means by which the space vehicle gets to the pad.

- Horizontally integrated rockets travel horizontally with the tail forward to the launch site on a transporter erector launcher and are then raised to the vertical position over the flame duct. Examples include all large Soviet rockets, including Soyuz, Proton, N1, and Energia. This method is also used by the SpaceX and Electron launch vehicles.
- Silo launched rockets are assembled inside of a missile silo. This method is only used by converted ICBMs due to the difficulty and expense of constructing a silo that can contain the forces of a rocket launch.
- Vertically integrated rockets can be assembled in a separate hangar on a mobile launcher platform (MLP). The MLP contains the umbilical structure and is carried to the launch site on a large vehicle called Crawler-transporter. Launch Complex 39 at the Kennedy Space Center is an example of a facility using this method. A similar system is used to launch Ariane 5 rockets at ELA-3 at Guiana Space Centre.
- Vertically assembled vehicles can also be transported on a mobile launcher platform resting on two parallel standard gauge railroad tracks that run from the integration building to launch area. This system is in use for the Atlas V and future Vulcan.
- At SLC-6 and SLC-37, rockets are assembled on the launch mount. A windowless rail-mounted building encloses the launch pad and gantry to protect the vehicle from the elements, and for purposes of military secrecy. Prior to launch, the building is rolled away. This method is also used at Kagoshima for the M-V.
- The former Sea Launch service used the converted self-propelled oil drilling platform Ocean Odyssey to transport Zenit 3SL rockets horizontally to the Equator, and then to erect and launch them from a floating launch platform into geostationary transfer orbits.

=== Service structure ===
A service structure is a steel framework or tower that is built on a launch pad to facilitate assembly and servicing.

An umbilical tower also usually includes an elevator which allows maintenance and crew access. Immediately before ignition of the rocket's motors, all connections between the tower and the craft are severed, and the bridges over which these connections pass often quickly swing away to prevent damage to the structure or vehicle.

=== Flame deflector systems ===
A flame deflector, flame diverter or flame trench is a structure or device designed to redirect or disperse the flame, heat, and exhaust gases produced by rocket engines or other propulsion systems. The amount of thrust generated by a rocket launch, along with the sound it produces during liftoff, can damage the launchpad and service structure, as well as the launch vehicle. The primary goal of the diverter is to prevent the flame from causing damage to equipment, infrastructure, or the surrounding environment. Flame diverters can be found at rocket launch sites and test stands where large volumes of exhaust gases are expelled during engine testing or vehicle launch.

=== Sound suppression systems ===
Sites for launching large rockets are often equipped with a sound suppression system to absorb or deflect acoustic energy generated during a rocket launch. As engine exhaust gasses exceed the speed of sound, they collide with the ambient air and shockwaves are created, with noise levels approaching 200 db. This energy can be reflected by the launch platform and pad surfaces, and could potentially cause damage to the launch vehicle, payload, and crew. For instance, the maximum admissible overall sound power level (OASPL) for payload integrity is approximately 145 db. Sound is dissipated by huge volumes of water distributed across the launch pad and launch platform during liftoff.

Water-based acoustic suppression systems are common on launch pads. They aid in reducing acoustic energy by injecting large quantities of water below the launch pad into the exhaust plume and in the area above the pad. Flame deflectors or flame trenches are designed to channel rocket exhaust away from the launch pad but also redirect acoustic energy away.

=== Hydrogen burn-off systems ===
In rockets using liquid hydrogen as their source of propellant, hydrogen burn-off systems (HBOI), also known as radially outward firing igniters (ROFI), can be utilized to prevent the build up of free gaseous hydrogen (GH2) in the aft engine area of the vehicle prior to engine start. Too much excess hydrogen in the aft during engine start can result in an overpressure blast wave that could damage the launch vehicle and surrounding pad structures.

== Validating engine performance and system readiness ==
The SpaceX launch sequence includes a hold-down feature of the launch pad that allows full engine ignition and systems check before liftoff. After the first-stage engine starts, the launcher is held down and not released for flight until all propulsion and vehicle systems are confirmed to be operating normally. Similar hold-down systems have been used on launch vehicles such as Saturn V and Space Shuttle. An automatic safe shut-down and unloading of propellant occur if any abnormal conditions are detected. Prior to the launch date, SpaceX sometimes completes a test cycle, culminating in a three-and-a-half second first stage engine static firing as well.

== See also ==
- Ground segment – Ground-based elements of a spacecraft system
- Launch vehicle – Rocket used to carry a spacecraft into space
- List of rocket launch sites
- Missile launch facility
- Non-rocket spacelaunch
- Pad abort test
- Rocket launch
- Service structure – Structure built on a rocket launch pad to service launch vehicles
- Spaceport
- Stratolaunch Systems – American space transportation venture
- Transporter erector launcher – Self-propelled heavy missile systems
