= Flame deflector =

Rocket launchpad structure

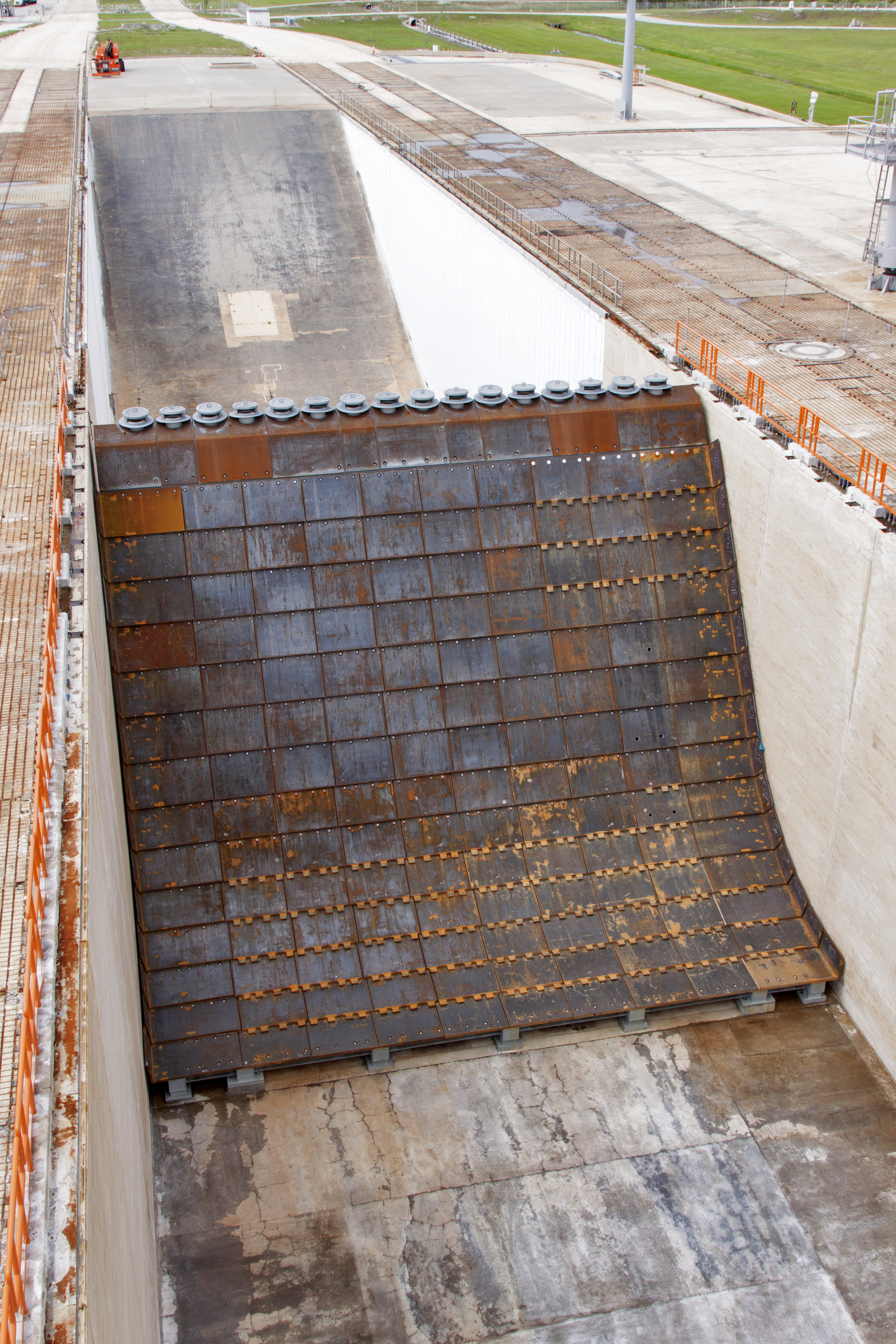
The main flame deflector in the flame trench at Launch Complex 39B at NASA's Kennedy Space Center in Florida. It deflects the plume exhaust from NASA's Space Launch System rocket during launch. It features a new "steel plated" design and incorporates water pipes for sound suppression.

A flame deflector, flame diverter or flame trench is a structure or device designed to redirect or disperse the flame, heat, and exhaust gases produced by rocket engines or other propulsion systems. The amount of thrust generated by a rocket launch, along with the sound it produces during liftoff, can damage the launchpad and service structure, as well as the launch vehicle. The primary goal of the diverter is to prevent the flame from causing damage to equipment, infrastructure, or the surrounding environment. Flame diverters can be found at rocket launch sites and test stands where large volumes of exhaust gases are expelled during engine testing or vehicle launch.

== Design and operation ==
The diverter typically comprises a robust, heat-resistant structure that channels the force of the exhaust gases and flames in a specific direction, typically away from the rocket or equipment. This is essential to prevent the potentially destructive effects of the high-temperature gases and to reduce the acoustic impact of the ignition.

A flame trench can also be used in combination with a diverter to form a trench-deflector system. The flames from the rocket travel through openings in the launchpad onto a flame deflector situated in the flame trench, which runs underneath the launch structure and extends well beyond the launchpad itself. To further reduce the acoustic effects a water sound suppression system may be also used.

== Notable examples ==
=== Apollo program ===
During the Apollo program the need for a flame deflector was a determining factor in the design of the Kennedy Space Center Launch Complex 39. NASA designers chose a two-way, wedge-type metal flame deflector. It measured 13 meters in height and 15 meters in width, with a total weight of 317 tons. Since the water table was close to the surface of the ground, the designers wanted the bottom of the flame trench at ground level. The flame deflector and trench determined the height and width of the octagonal launch pad.

=== Space Shuttle program ===
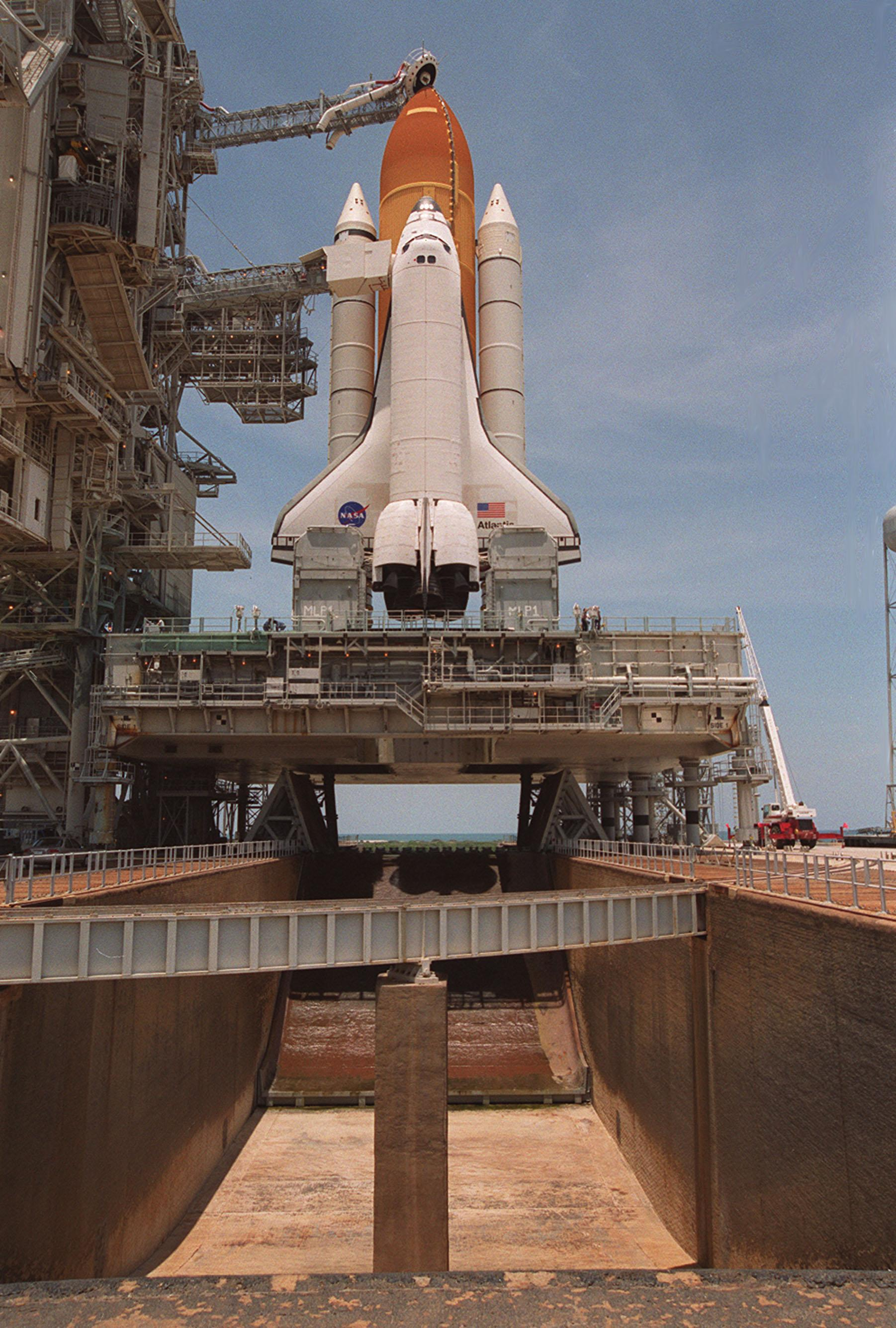
The Shuttle flame trench-deflector system under a vehicle ready for launch.

During the Space Shuttle program NASA modified Launch Complex 39B at Kennedy Space Center. They installed a flame trench that was 150 meters long, 18 meters wide, and 13 meters deep. It was built with concrete and refractory brick. The main flame deflector was situated inside the trench directly underneath the rocket boosters. The V-shaped steel structure was covered with a high-temperature concrete material. It separated the exhaust of the orbiter main engines and of the solid rocket boosters into two flame trenches. It was approximately 11.6 meters high, 17.5 meters wide, and 22 meters long. The Shuttle flame trench-diverter system was refurbished for the SLS program.

=== Baikonur Cosmodrome ===
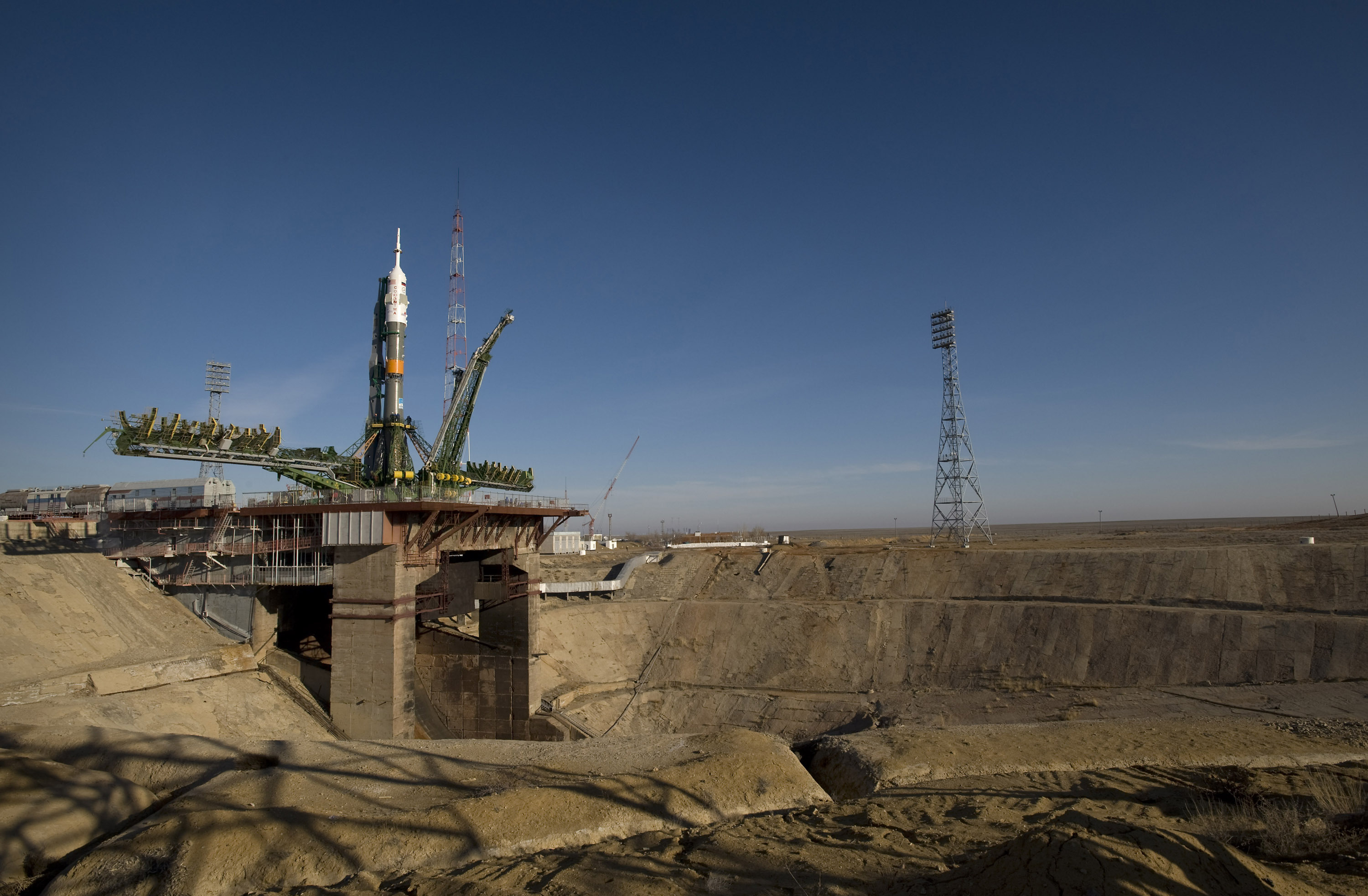
A Soyuz rocket erected into position at the launch pad at the Baikonur Cosmodrome in Kazakhstan in 2009. The flame deflector and pit is visible below.

The main launch pads at the Russian launch complex of Baikonur Cosmodrome use a flame pit to manage launch exhaust. The launch vehicles are transported by rail to the launch pad, where they are vertically erected over a large flame deflector pit. A similar structure was built by the European Space Agency at its Guiana Space Centre.

=== SpaceX Starship launch mounts ===
During the first orbital test flight of SpaceX's Starship vehicle in April 2023, the launch mount of Starbase was substantially damaged due to the lack of a flame diverter system. The 33 Raptor rocket engines dug a 25-foot-deep (7.6 m) crater and scattered debris and dust over a wide area. The company, while still evaluating the need for a flame trench, designed and that July, tested a water deluge system intended to protect the launch mount and vehicle by spraying large quantities of water from a piece of steel equipment under the rocket. In November of the same year, the water deluge system successfully protected the launchpad during the second orbital flight test of Starship, sufficiently to avoid the cloud of dust and debris that rose up during the first test.

A new launch mount was designed, with both a new bidirectional flame trench and new water deluge system, intended to eliminate ablation and the resulting need for refurbishment between each launch. It was built as Starbase Pad 2, and first flight-tested on Starship flight test 12.

=== RAAF Woomera Range Complex ===
The Woomera Range Complex (formerly the Woomera Test Range and Woomera Rocket Range) is a weapons research and testing establishment in the outback of South Australia, operated by the Royal Australian Air Force (RAAF). It hosts a number of active and decommissioned rocket launch facilities, including Launch Area 6A (LA-6A), which was used in the development of ELDO's Europa satellite launch vehicle. LA-6A consisted of a test stand/launch mount positioned over a steep gully, and a flame diversion duct lined with white heat-resistant tiles. Owing to this arrangement, the builders did not see a need for a water deluge system to dampen the exhaust. LA-6A was similar to facilities in the Soviet Union and at RAF Spadeadam in the United Kingdom. The site was active as a testing facility between June 1964 and June 1970. Most of the infrastructure, including the hangar and mobile service tower, has since been removed. However, the launch mount and flame diversion gully remain, and are visible to this day.
