= Rendezvous Docking Simulator =

Facility at Langley Research Center

- U.S. National Register of Historic Places
- U.S. National Historic Landmark
- Virginia Landmarks Register
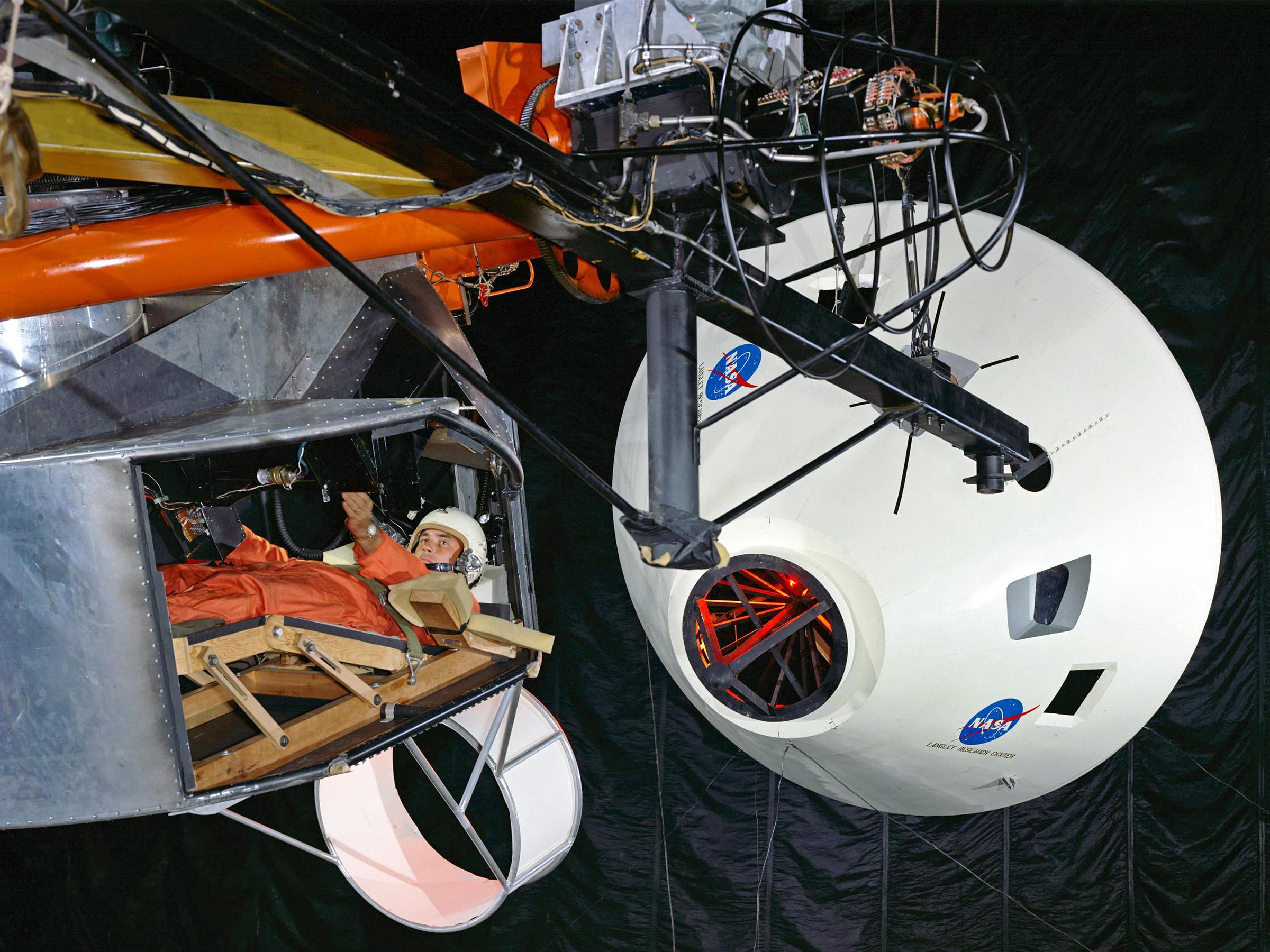
- Docking practice during Apollo program

- Location within Virginia Location within the United States
- Location: Hampton, Virginia
- Coordinates: 37°5′8″N 76°22′41″W
- Built: 1963
- Architect: NASA
- NRHP reference No.: 85002809
- VLR No.: 114-0141

Significant dates
- Added to NRHP: October 3, 1985
- Designated NHL: October 3, 1985
- Designated VLR: February 18, 1986

The Rendezvous Docking Simulator, also known as the Real-Time Dynamic Simulator, is a simulator at the Langley Research Center. It was constructed for the Gemini program in Building 1244 and it became operational in June 1963 at a cost of $320,000 and later reconfigured for the Apollo program. The simulator consists of a gantry frame, with an overhead carriage from which test craft were suspended by cables. A gimbal was powered hydraulically and was capable of changing pitch and yaw at a rate of 1 radian per second or roll at 2 radians per second. The gantry also moved like an overhead crane using electric motors and was capable of travelling 210 feet (64 m) longitudinally at up to 20 feet per second (6.1 m/s), 16 feet (4.9 m) laterally at up to 4 feet per second (1.2 m/s) and vertically 45 feet (14 m) at up to 10 feet per second (3.0 m/s).

It is the only surviving simulator from the NASA Gemini and Apollo space programs that was used by astronauts to practice docking of space capsules with other vessels. Ability to dock reliably with the Apollo Lunar Module was a crucial skill essential for the mission to return from the Moon. The docking simulator was used alongside the Projection Planetarium in training exercises.

It was declared a National Historic Landmark in 1985.

Currently it is stored, hanging from the rafters in Building 1244, a vast hangar at Langley, and there are no plans for it otherwise.

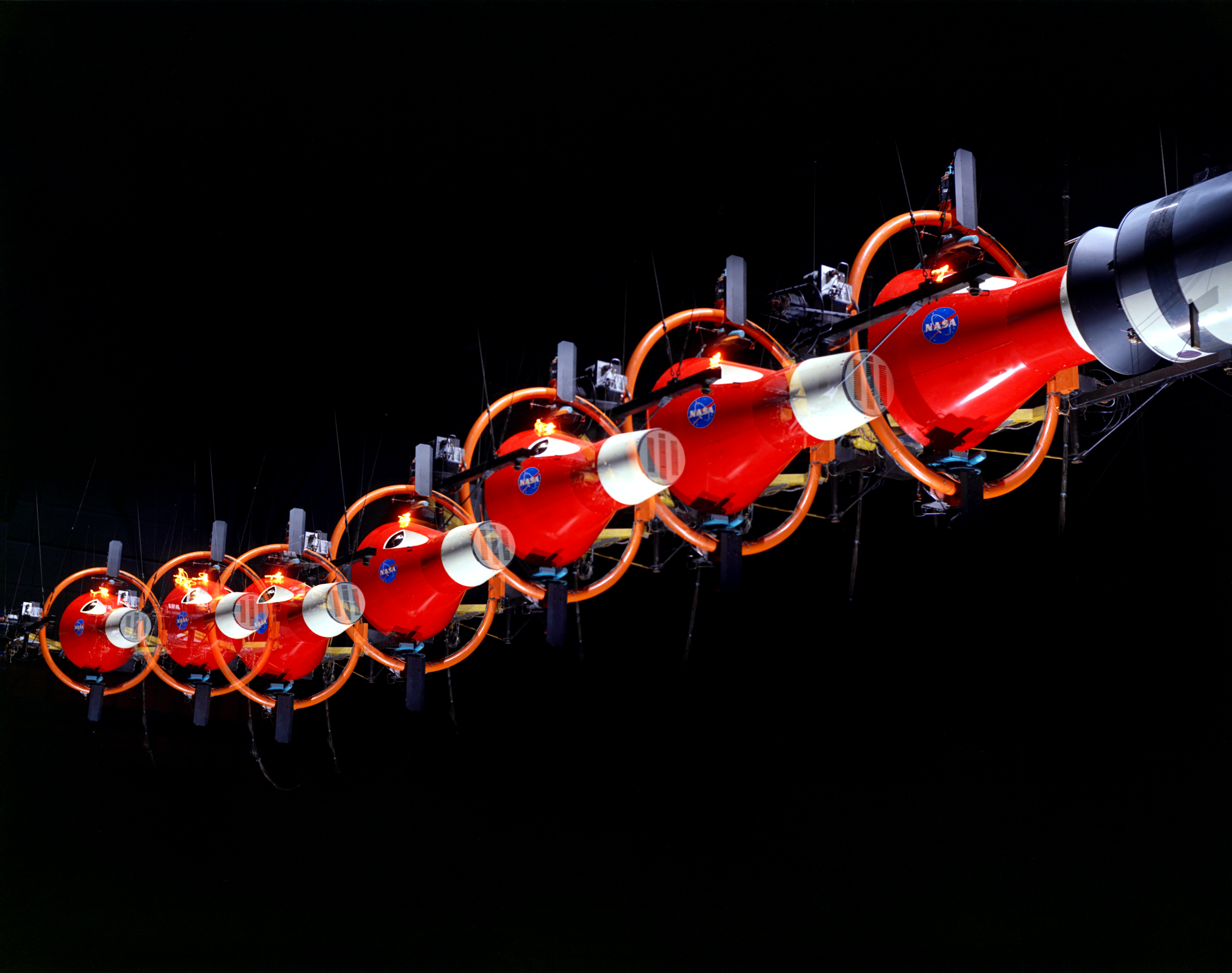
Multi exposure of Rendezvous Docking Simulator in use

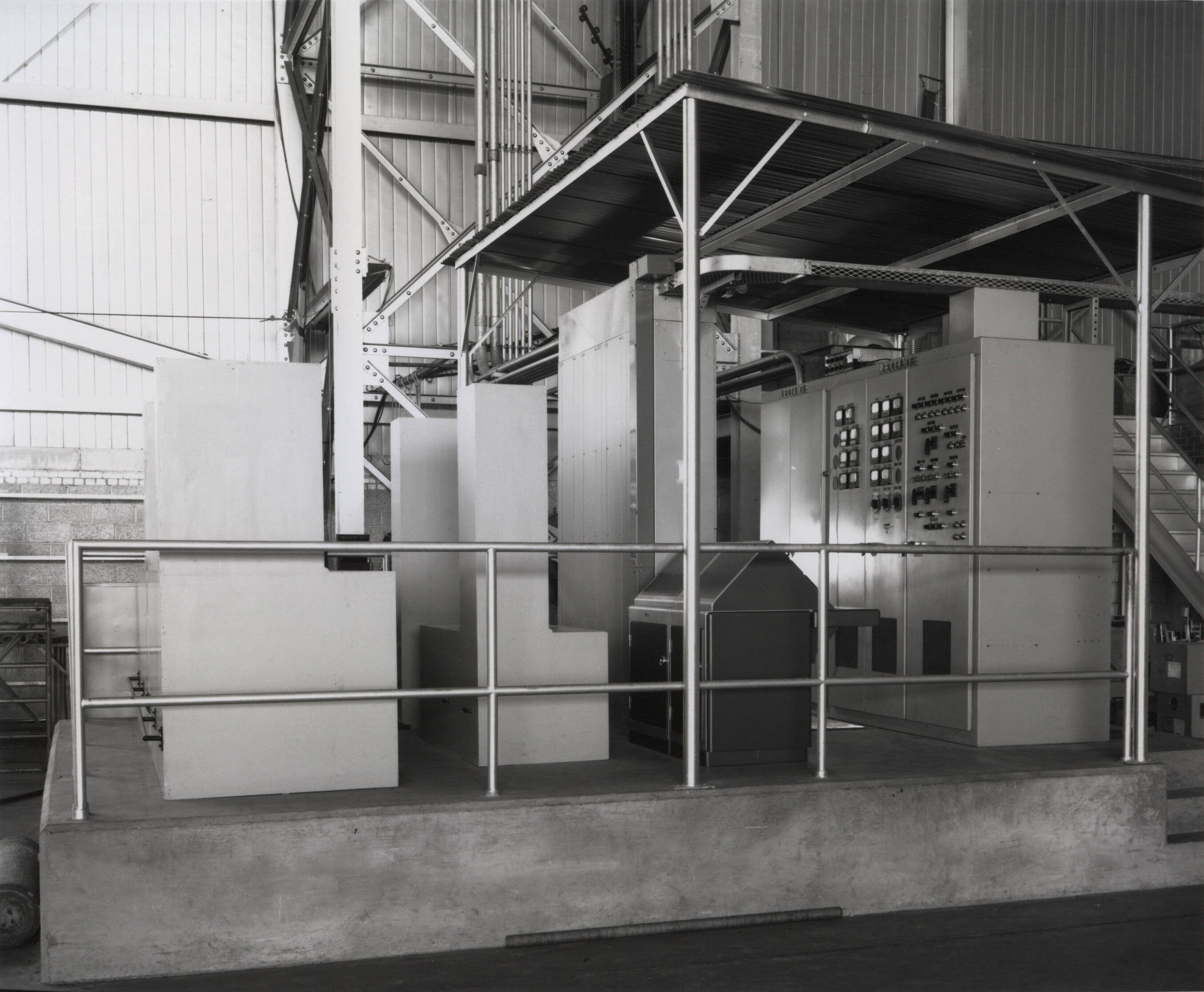
Simulator controls

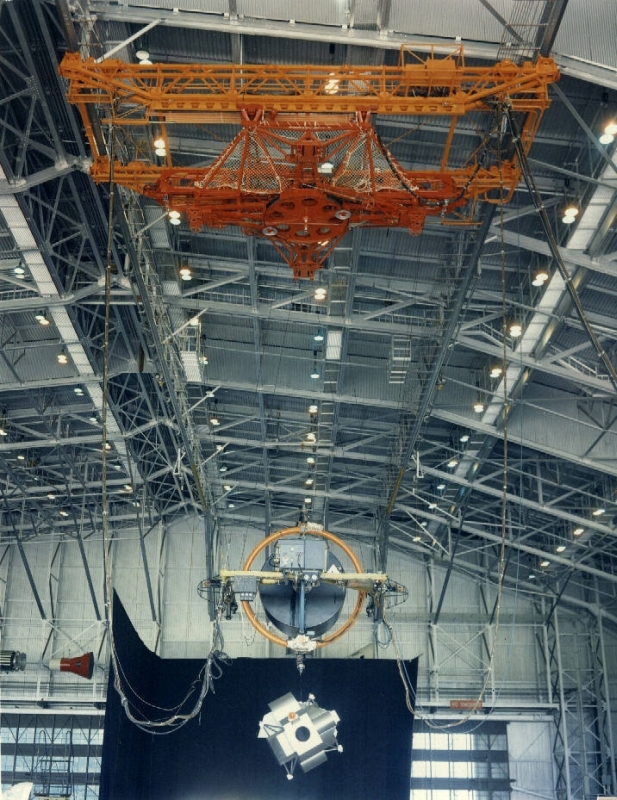
Simulating docking the lunar and command modules in lunar orbit in 1967

== See also ==
- List of National Historic Landmarks in Virginia
- National Register of Historic Places listings in Hampton, Virginia
