= Emission test cycle =

Test specified by an emission standard

An emission test cycle is a protocol contained in an emission standard to allow repeatable and comparable measurement of exhaust emissions for different engines or vehicles. Test cycles specify the conditions under which the engine or vehicle is operated during the emission test. There are many different test cycles issued by various national and international governments and working groups. Specified parameters in a test cycle include a range of operating temperature, speed, and load. Ideally these should reproduce something representative of normal usage. But because there is such a wide variety of usage patterns and because it is impractical to test an engine or vehicle under every possible combination of speed, load, and temperature, this may not actually be the case.

The engine management settings that give the lowest emissions, or low enough emissions to pass the test, are usually different to those that give the best fuel economy or performance. Since the latter characteristics are those that attract buyers, a potential problem with cycles that are a simplified version of real-world usage is that vehicle and engine manufacturers may exploit the limited number of test conditions in the cycle by programming their engine management systems to control emissions to regulated levels at the specific test points contained in the cycle, but at all other times to give the best economy or performance. This undermines the main aim of the tests, namely improved air quality and public health.

== Application ==
Emission test cycles are typical tests for research and development activities on engines at automobile OEMs.
The commonly used hardware platforms therefore are:

- engine test stand - for just a single engine
- vehicle test stand (also "chassis dynamometer" or "chassis dyno" or "emission dyno") - for the complete car with engine
- ASM Test - Accelerated Simulation Mode: (California inspections) Vehicles tested at 15 MPH & 25 MPH where vehicle undergoes a load.

== See also ==
- Emission standards
- Engine test stand
- Vehicle inspection
