= Projection Planetarium =

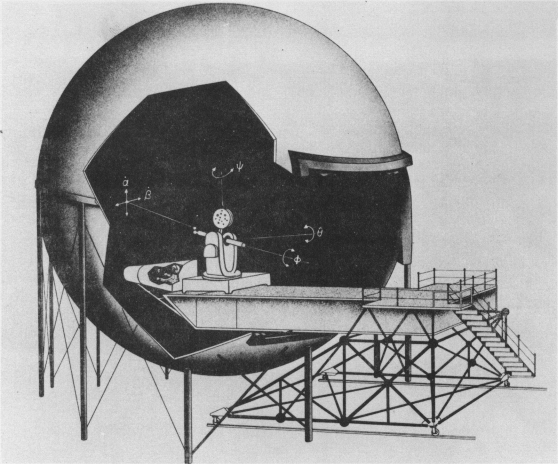
- Engineering diagram of the Projection Planetarium
- Uses: Training astronauts

The Projection Planetarium was a training device housed in the Flight Research Laboratory hangar at NASA's Langley Research Center in Hampton, Virginia. It consisted of a custom designed star projector surrounded by a 40 feet (12 m) diameter sphere constructed from a surplus 53 feet (16 m) radome. The star projector was movable in 3 directions while the capsule mockup and its pilots remained static. The system was used in studies of manual control of spacecraft using "out the window" visual information both in orbit and in a launch abort scenario. The planetarium was constructed in 1965 at a cost of $153,103 for research and development and $177,000 for construction and materials. An additional $145,400 worth of surplus materials were made use of in the project.

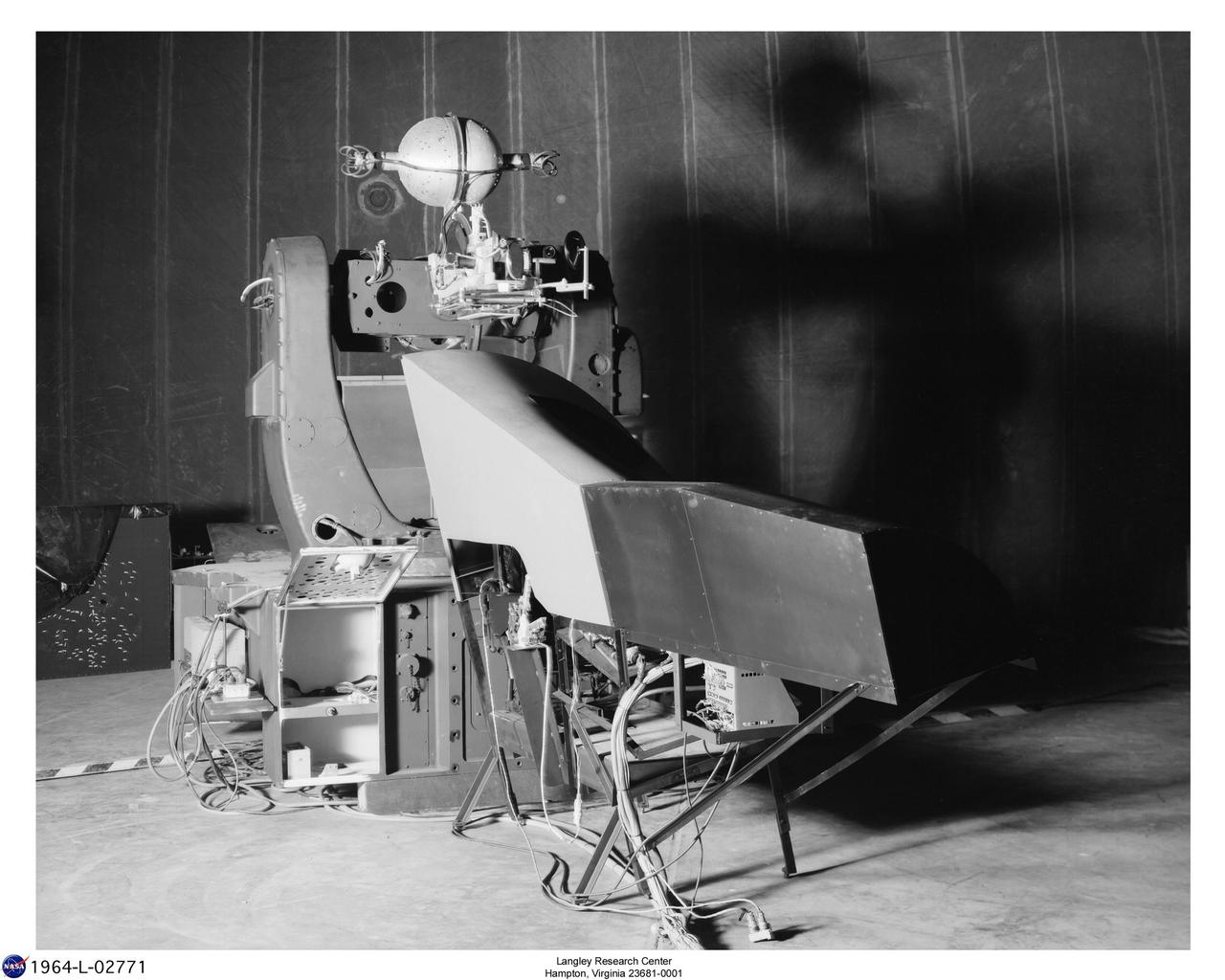
Star projector

Described by A.W. Vogeley in a paper presented at the American Society of Mechanical Engineers Winter 1966 meeting entitled "Piloted Space-Flight Simulation at Langley Research Center", the system was used to study Apollo launch-abort problems with a "horizon-to-horizon view of Florida as seen from about 100,000 feet." The inflatable sphere enclosing the projector and fixed Gemini capsule mockup also displayed star images. The star projector was sufficient for testing pilot control problems such as rendezvous because the star field was used "primarily as an attitude reference" but was insufficient for testing navigation issues.

Navigational training of Gemini, Apollo, and some Space Shuttle astronauts was conducted at the Morehead Planetarium in Chapel Hill, North Carolina.

== See also ==
- Rendezvous Docking Simulator
