= Engine cart =

An engine cart is an engine support on rollers used at an engine test stand. For example, the combustion engine is mounted on this mobile support for holding the engine in an accurate position during the test.

Compared to a fixed support, the engine cart is used for preparing the combustion engine outside the test stand in a separate rigging area.

The transport from the rigging area to the test room is made manually.
