= Flight Research Laboratory =

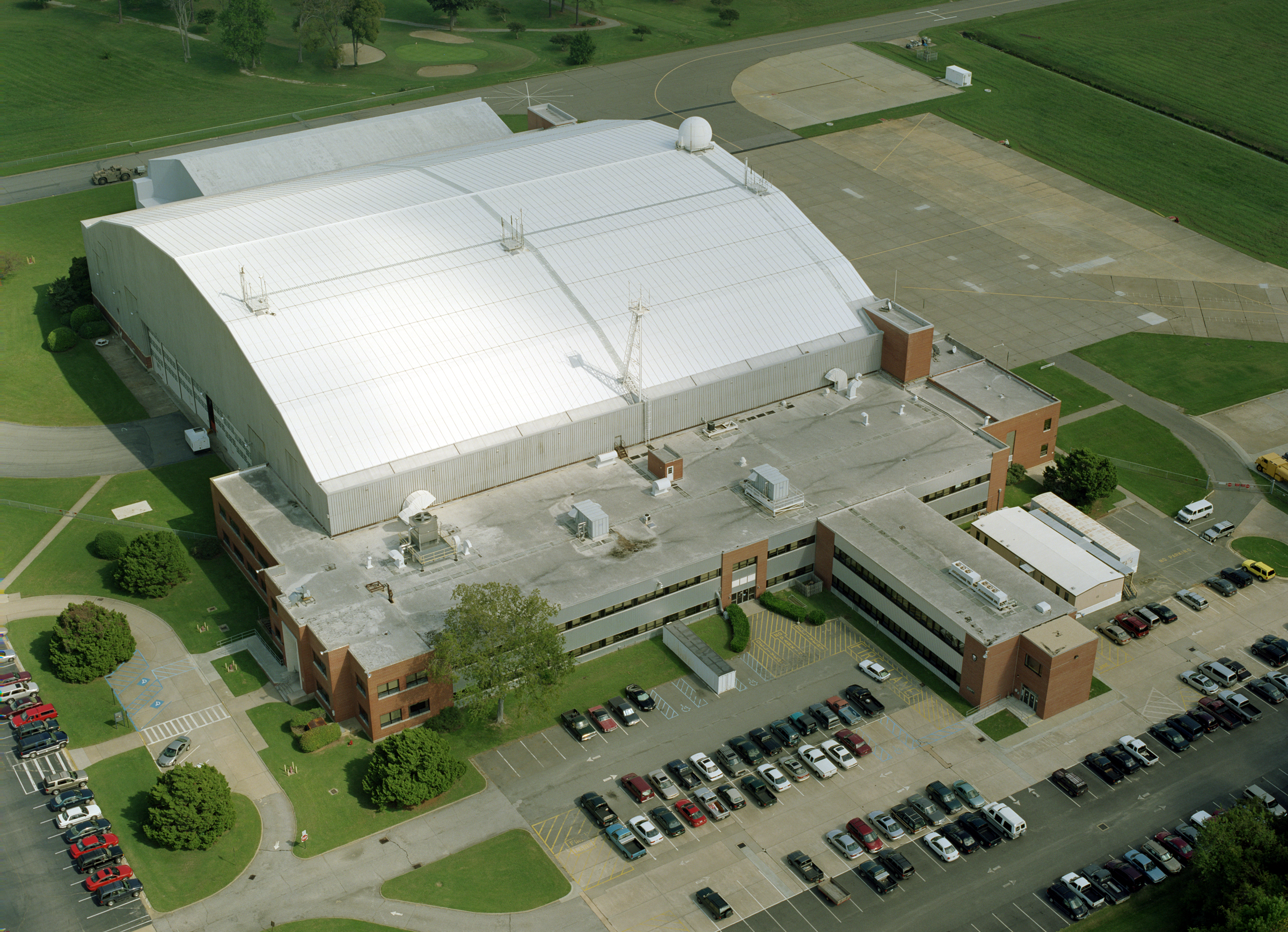
- aerial view from 2010
- Alternative names: LRC Building 1244; The Hangar

General information
- Status: active
- Type: aircraft hangar
- Location: Hampton, VA, USA
- Current tenants: Langley Research Center
- Construction started: 1949
- Completed: 1951
- Cost: $3,018,000 (1951)
- Renovation cost: $141,395 (1959)
- Client: NACA

The Flight Research Laboratory (building 1244) at NASA's Langley Research Center houses fixed and rotary wing aircraft used in atmospheric and flight research. It also housed simulation equipment used during the Gemini and Apollo programs such as the Rendezvous Docking Simulator (which remains stowed in the ceiling of the hangar) and Projector Planetarium.

The hangar consists of 295 feet (90 m) by 330 feet (100 m) of clear space and features a 300 feet (91 m) by 40 feet (12 m) door with an additional door for the tail section of large aircraft and covers 70,000 square feet (6,500 m^{2}) with an additional 1,007,500 cubic feet (28,530 m^{3}) of laboratory spaces. At the time of its construction it was one of the largest structures of its kind in the world. The hangar is heated by a radiant heating system consisting of hot water circulated beneath the concrete floor.

== See also ==
- Rendezvous Docking Simulator
- Projection Planetarium
