= Dream Airplanes =

Aviation engineering cartoon series by C. W. Miller

- "An Airplane is Not a Rabbit", by Charles W. Miller
- Year: 1948
- Subject: Drawings of spoofed aircraft types

Dream Airplanes is a series of satirical aviation drawings by aeronautical engineer and cartoonist Charles W. Miller. Each drawing depicts the aircraft that might result if one engineering or production specialty were allowed to determine an airplane's design without accommodating the requirements of other disciplines. The drawings have been used in aircraft-design and systems-engineering literature to illustrate multidisciplinary design, organizational specialization, and the need to negotiate technical trade-offs.

The earliest located public appearance of Miller's drawings is in Stanley E. Sohler's article, "An Airplane is Not a Rabbit", published in the April 1948 issue of the California Institute of Technology's Engineering and Science Monthly.

== Description ==
The cartoons present exaggerated aircraft reflecting the priorities of individual technical groups. In later composite versions, the groups include aerodynamics, structural stress, power plant, electrical systems, hydraulics, equipment, controls, fuselage design, lofting, and production engineering.

The aerodynamics group's aircraft is depicted as a smooth and streamlined form, while the stress group's design resembles a heavily reinforced structural framework. The power-plant version is dominated by its engine, the equipment and electrical versions are crowded with components, and the production-engineering version is reduced to a comparatively simple form. The humor derives from each design being internally understandable from one specialist's perspective but unsuitable as a complete aircraft.

The series is generally interpreted as a visual argument for integrated or concurrent design. Rather than suggesting that any one specialty is unnecessary, the cartoons show how individually valid technical objectives can produce an impractical result when pursued without coordination.

== Origins and initial publication ==
Five of Miller's departmental aircraft drawings appeared across two pages of Sohler's 1948 article. The published credit identified Miller as a member of the "Aerodynamics Department, North American Aircraft Corp."

Sohler characterized the idea as an existing joke that circulated through engineering departments in the aircraft industry. This indicates that Miller's cartoons, or closely related versions of the joke, may have circulated informally within aircraft companies before their 1948 publication. No earlier public printed appearance has been firmly documented.

The 1948 publication included drawings labeled for the aerodynamics, stress, production, armament, and electrical groups. Later versions contain additional specialties and arrange the drawings as a single composite illustration. The date and authorship of this expansion have not been conclusively established.

== Charles W. Miller ==
Charles W. Miller was an aeronautical engineer, artist, and cartoonist whose career included work associated with Lockheed Aircraft Corporation, Vega Aircraft Corporation, North American Aviation, and Northrop Aircraft.

The Charles W. Miller Papers are held by the Aviation Safety and Security Archives at Embry–Riddle Aeronautical University. The collection includes engineering reports, calculations, drawings, memoranda, reference materials, cartoons, and pen-and-ink illustrations. Archival records give Miller's life dates as 1917–2014.

Later reproductions of Dream Airplanes frequently describe Miller as a Vega Aircraft Corporation design engineer. The earliest located publication, however, identifies him with North American Aircraft. Miller's archival employment history includes both companies, which may account for the differing descriptions.

== Publication history ==
The drawings became widely known through Leland M. Nicolai's textbook Fundamentals of Aircraft Design, first published in 1975 and later issued in revised editions.

The revised textbook tradition presented the expanded illustration under the collective title "Dream Airplanes". The illustration appears near the beginning of Nicolai and Grant E. Carichner's 2010 Fundamentals of Aircraft and Airship Design, where it introduces aircraft design as a process requiring compromise among specialist groups.

Historian of technology Thomas P. Hughes reproduced Miller's drawing in Rescuing Prometheus, using it to illustrate the consequences of failing to negotiate compromises among technical specialists during systems development.

The image has subsequently appeared in university aircraft-design courses, human-factors discussions, systems-engineering presentations, and literature concerning concurrent engineering.

== Adaptations ==
The structure of Miller's cartoon has been adapted to other engineering fields. A wind-energy version titled "Dream Turbines" applies the same concept to wind-turbine design, depicting the results of allowing individual technical disciplines to dominate the overall system. The adaptation was illustrated by Rick Hinrichs.

Other later variants have substituted companies, organizational departments, or modern aircraft requirements for Miller's original engineering groups. These derivatives retain the central premise that a complex system cannot be designed successfully from a single disciplinary viewpoint.

== See also ==
- Aircraft design process
- Concurrent engineering
- Systems engineering
- Systems thinking
- Design by committee
