= Iron bird (aviation) =

Ground-based testbed for aviation systems

An iron bird is a ground-based test rig used for prototyping and integrating aircraft systems during the development of new aircraft designs. It is almost a complete light aircraft, but without any fuselage, superstructure, seating, and other non-flight-systems equipment. Aircraft systems are installed into the iron bird so their functions can be tested both individually and in correlation with other systems.

== Use ==
Iron birds have a long history in the aerospace industry. Lockheed Martin has had many such, for example; the one for the F-22 being known formally in-house as the Vehicle System Simulator, operated out of its VSS Lab in Fort Worth. The Airbus A380 iron bird constructed in 2003 in a building near to Toulouse St. Martin was informally known as "Aircraft Zero". Previous Airbus aircraft, including the Airbus A330 had also had iron bird test rigs.

It was iron bird testing of a modified F-8 that caught problems with the IBM AP-101 computers that had been intended to be used on the Space Shuttle. NASA's Digital Fly-By-Wire team, set up in 1969 and sponsored by many at the NASA Flight Research Center at Edwards Air Force Base as well as by Neil Armstrong, had earlier created the fly-by-wire modified F-8, that had begun in March 1971 and had been doing extensive testing by the end of that year. The NASA team had decided to use the same computers as proposed for the Shuttle in phase 2 of its fly-by-wire development programme, and contracted for supply from IBM in August 1973. Whilst the Space Shuttle test bench had been in an air-conditioned laboratory, the F-8 iron bird was in an outside hangar at Dryden Flight Research Center, where it was discovered that at non-laboratory temperatures (rather than the lab's 50 °F (10 °C)) the AP-101s overheated. IBM had to change the thermal coating process that it had been using for its printed circuit boards.

== Overview ==
Iron birds are used for system integration, reliability testing, and shakedown testing of aircraft systems such as landing gear, avionics, hydraulics, and flight controls. The components are arranged roughly in the same layout as they will be in the final aircraft design, (Note: If actual flight hardware is used but the components are not physically arranged as they would be on an aircraft, this is instead called a hot-bench simulation.) with actuators used to simulate aerodynamic loads, but are left accessible for ease of maintenance. Some iron birds also include a flight deck so that testing can include pilot inputs and simulated flight profiles, and can be used in pre-flight pilot training. Others are used for testing of propulsion systems.

Iron birds can also be used after aircraft certification for troubleshooting ongoing issues and for testing of proposed modifications prior to fleet integration.

== See also ==
- Engine test stand
- Testbed aircraft
