= Sound suppression system =

Water-based rocket launch noise control

Sites for launching large rockets are often equipped with a sound suppression system to absorb or deflect acoustic energy generated during a rocket launch. As engine exhaust gasses exceed the speed of sound, they collide with the ambient air and shockwaves are created, with noise levels approaching 200 db. This energy can be reflected by the launch platform and pad surfaces, and could potentially cause damage to the launch vehicle, payload, and crew. For instance, the maximum admissible overall sound power level (OASPL) for payload integrity is approximately 145 db. Sound is dissipated by huge volumes of water distributed across the launch pad and launch platform during liftoff.

Water-based acoustic suppression systems are common on launch pads. They aid in reducing acoustic energy by injecting large quantities of water below the launch pad into the exhaust plume and in the area above the pad. Flame deflectors or flame trenches are designed to channel rocket exhaust away from the launch pad but also redirect acoustic energy away.

== Soviet Union/Russia ==
The launch pad built by the Soviet Union beginning in 1978 at the Baikonur Cosmodrome for launching the Energiya rocket included an elaborate sound suppression system which delivered a peak flow of 18 cubic metres (4,800 US gal) per second fed by three ground level reservoirs totaling 18,000 cubic metres (4,800,000 US gal).

== NASA ==
=== Space Shuttle program ===
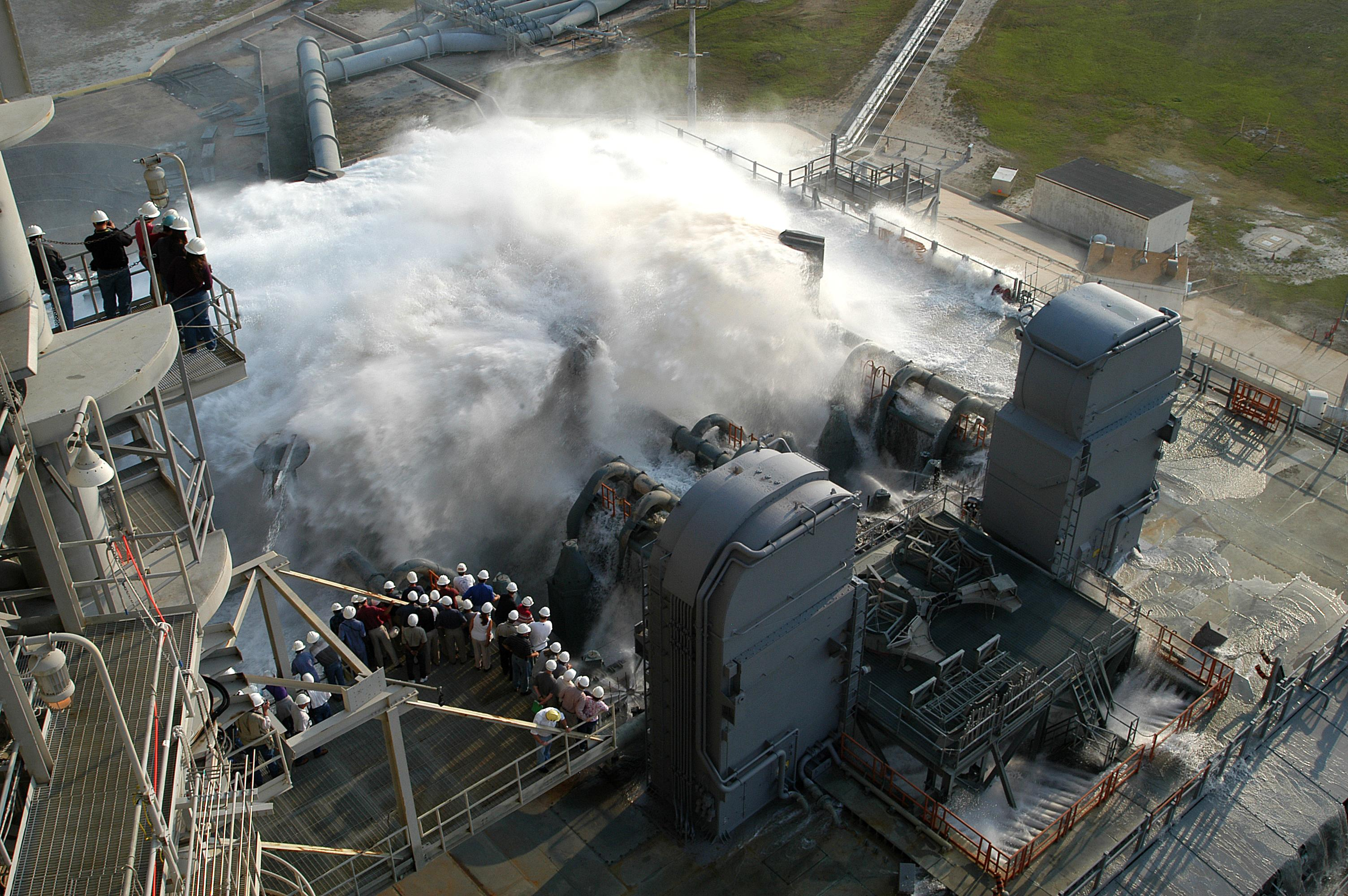
Water is released onto an MLP at LC-39A at the start of a sound suppression system test in 2004. During launch, 300,000 US gallons (1.1 million litres) of water are poured onto the pad in only 41 seconds.

Data from the launch of STS-1 found that an overpressure wave created by the shuttle's three SSME (now designated RS-25) liquid-fueled rocket engines and the four-segment solid rocket boosters contributed to the loss of sixteen and damage to an additional 148 thermal protection tiles, prompting modifications to the Sound Suppression Water System (SSWS) installed at both launch pads at Kennedy Space Center's Launch Complex 39.

The resulting gravity-fed system, used throughout the remainder of the program, began release from a 300,000-US-gallon (1.1-million-litre) water tower at the launch site 6.6 seconds before main engine start, fed through 7 feet (2.1 m) diameter pipes connected to the mobile launch platform. Water flowed out of six 12-foot-high (3.7 m) towers (known as "rainbirds") onto the launch platform and into the flame trench below, emptying the system in 41 seconds with a peak flow reducing acoustic energy levels at launch to approximately 142 dB.

The massive white clouds that billowed around the shuttle components at each launch were therefore not smoke, but rather wet steam generated as the rocket exhaust boiled away huge quantities of water.

=== Antares ===
Launch pad 0 at the Mid-Atlantic Spaceport at NASA's Wallops Flight Facility in Virginia is equipped with a 950,000 litres (250,000 US gal) water tower 307 feet (94 m) above the ground, among the tallest in the world. Engine exhaust exits through ring of water jets in the launch platform, directly beneath engine nozzles. The system is capable of delivering 4,000 US gallons (15 m^{3}) per second. Additional storage tanks totaling 100,000 US gallons (380,000 L; 83,000 imp gal) may be added for static fire tests. Water not vaporized is held in a 1,200 square metres (13,000 sq ft) retention basin where it is tested before release.

=== Space Launch System ===
Following the retirement of the Space Shuttle program, pad B at launch complex 39 was upgraded for launches of the Space Launch System (SLS). SLS features an additional RS-25 liquid-fueled rocket engine along with an additional segment in each of its solid rocket boosters over the Space Shuttle program prompting upgrades to the system creating the Ignition Over-Pressure/Sound Suppression Water System (IOP/SS).

The control system was upgraded including replacement of nearly 250 miles (400 km) of copper cables with 57 miles (92 km) of fiber optic cable. Capacity was upgraded to 400,000 US gallons (1,500,000 L) with a peak flow rate of 1,100,000 US gallons (4,200,000 L) per minute. The upgraded system was tested in December 2018 with 450,000 US gallons (1,700,000 L).

== Japan Aerospace Exploration Agency (JAXA) ==
JAXA "seeks to achieve the world's quietest launch" from their Noshiro Rocket Testing Center in Akita with the installation of a sound suppression water system as well as sound absorbing walls. The H3 Scaled Acoustic Reduction Experiment completed in 2017 provided additional data about the noise generated during liftoff.
