= Aircraft design process =

Establishing the configuration and plans for a new aeroplane

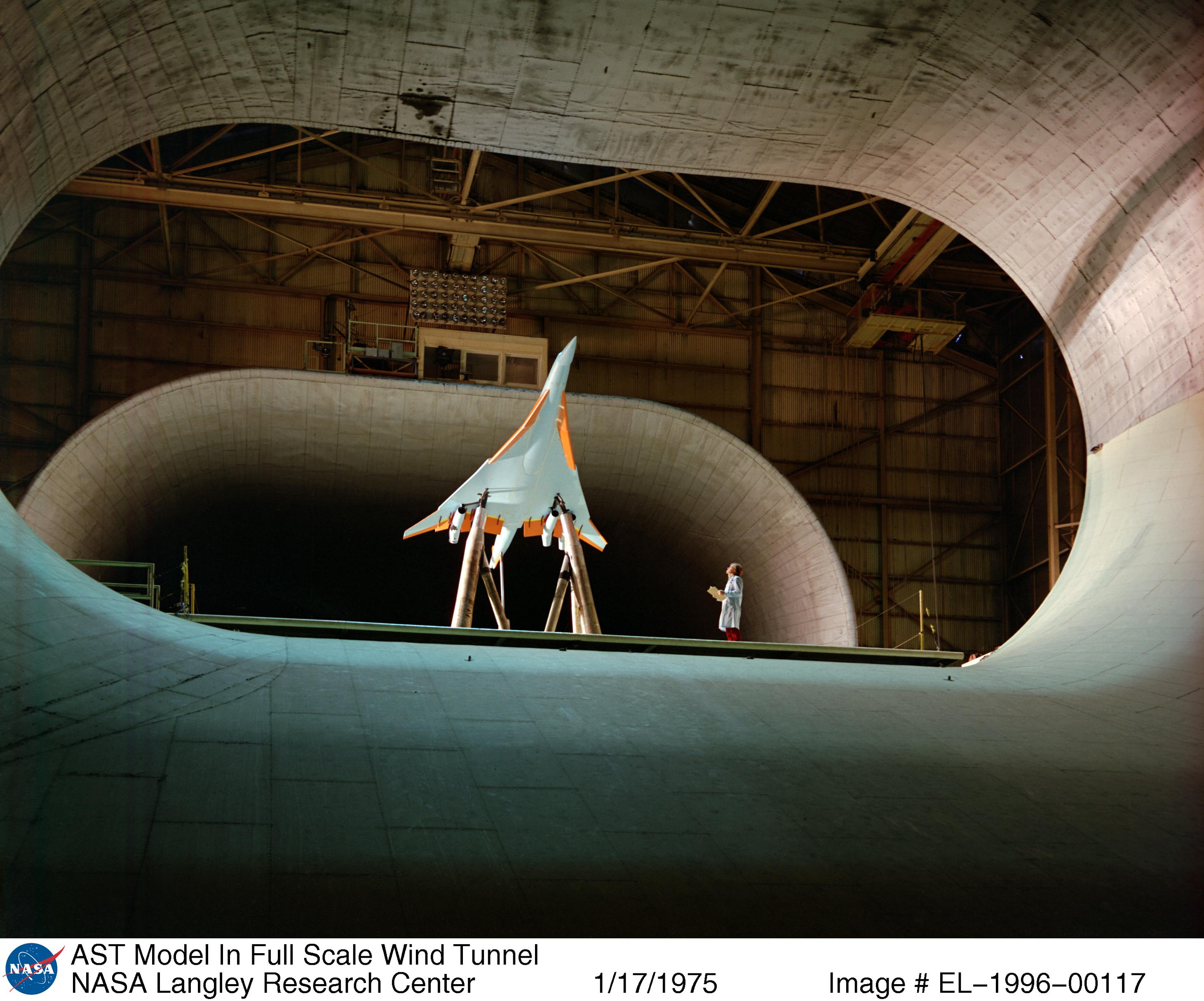
Advanced Supersonic Transport (AST) model in wind tunnel

The aircraft design process is a loosely defined method used to balance many competing and demanding requirements to produce an aircraft that is strong, lightweight, economical and can carry an adequate payload while being sufficiently reliable to safely fly for the design life of the aircraft. Similar to, but more exacting than, the usual engineering design process, the technique is highly iterative, involving high-level configuration tradeoffs, a mixture of analysis and testing and the detailed examination of the adequacy of every part of the structure. For some types of aircraft, the design process is regulated by civil airworthiness authorities.

This article deals with powered aircraft such as airplanes and helicopter designs.

== Design constraints ==
=== Purpose ===
The design process starts with the aircraft's intended purpose. Commercial airliners are designed for carrying a passenger or cargo payload, long range and greater fuel efficiency whereas fighter jets are designed to perform high speed maneuvers and provide close support to ground troops. Some aircraft have specific missions, for instance, amphibious airplanes have a unique design that allows them to operate from both land and water, some fighters, like the Harrier jump jet, have VTOL (vertical take-off and landing) ability, helicopters have the ability to hover over an area for a period of time.

The purpose may be to fit a specific requirement, e.g. as in the historical case of a British Air Ministry specification, or fill a perceived "gap in the market"; that is, a class or design of aircraft which does not yet exist, but for which there would be significant demand.

=== Aircraft regulations ===
Another important factor that influences the design are the requirements for obtaining a type certificate for a new design of aircraft. These requirements are published by major national airworthiness authorities including the US Federal Aviation Administration and the European Aviation Safety Agency.

Airports may also impose limits on aircraft, for instance, the maximum wingspan allowed for a conventional aircraft is 80 metres (260 ft) to prevent collisions between aircraft while taxiing.

=== Financial factors and market ===
Budget limitations, market requirements and competition set constraints on the design process and comprise the non-technical influences on aircraft design along with environmental factors. Competition leads to companies striving for better efficiency in the design without compromising performance and incorporating new techniques and technology.

In the 1950s and '60s, unattainable project goals were regularly set, but then abandoned, whereas today troubled programs like the Boeing 787 and the Lockheed Martin F-35 have proven far more costly and complex to develop than expected. More advanced and integrated design tools have been developed. Model-based systems engineering predicts potentially problematic interactions, while computational analysis and optimization allows designers to explore more options early in the process. Increasing automation in engineering and manufacturing allows faster and cheaper development. Technology advances from materials to manufacturing enable more complex design variations like multifunction parts. Once impossible to design or construct, these can now be 3D printed, but they have yet to prove their utility in applications like the Northrop Grumman B-21 or the re-engined A320neo and 737 MAX. Airbus and Boeing also recognize the economic limits, that the next airliner generation cannot cost more than the previous ones did.

=== Environmental factors ===
An increase in the number of aircraft also means greater carbon emissions. Environmental scientists have voiced concern over the main kinds of pollution associated with aircraft, mainly noise and emissions. Aircraft engines have been historically notorious for creating noise pollution and the expansion of airways over already congested and polluted cities have drawn heavy criticism, making it necessary to have environmental policies for aircraft noise. Noise also arises from the airframe, where the airflow directions are changed. Improved noise regulations have forced designers to create quieter engines and airframes. Emissions from aircraft include particulates, carbon dioxide (CO_{2}), sulfur dioxide (SO_{2}), carbon monoxide (CO), various oxides of nitrates and unburnt hydrocarbons. To combat the pollution, ICAO set recommendations in 1981 to control aircraft emissions. Newer, environmentally friendly fuels have been developed and the use of recyclable materials in manufacturing have helped reduce the ecological impact due to aircraft. Environmental limitations also affect airfield compatibility. Airports around the world have been built to suit the topography of the particular region. Space limitations, pavement design, runway end safety areas and the unique location of airport are some of the airport factors that influence aircraft design. However changes in aircraft design also influence airfield design as well, for instance, the recent introduction of new large aircraft (NLAs) such as the superjumbo Airbus A380, have led to airports worldwide redesigning their facilities to accommodate its large size and service requirements.

=== Safety ===
The high speeds, fuel tanks, atmospheric conditions at cruise altitudes, natural hazards (thunderstorms, hail and bird strikes) and human error are some of the many hazards that pose a threat to air travel.

Airworthiness is the standard by which aircraft are determined fit to fly. The responsibility for airworthiness lies with the national civil aviation regulatory bodies, manufacturers, as well as owners and operators.

The International Civil Aviation Organization sets international standards and recommended practices on which national authorities should base their regulations. The national regulatory authorities set standards for airworthiness, issue certificates to manufacturers and operators and the standards of personnel training. Every country has its own regulatory body such as the Federal Aviation Administration in USA, DGCA (Directorate General of Civil Aviation) in India, etc.

The aircraft manufacturer makes sure that the aircraft meets existing design standards, defines the operating limitations and maintenance schedules and provides support and maintenance throughout the operational life of the aircraft. The aviation operators include the passenger and cargo airliners, air forces and owners of private aircraft. They agree to comply with the regulations set by the regulatory bodies, understand the limitations of the aircraft as specified by the manufacturer, report defects and assist the manufacturers in keeping up the airworthiness standards.

Most of the design criticisms these days are built on crashworthiness. Even with the greatest attention to airworthiness, accidents still occur. Crashworthiness is the qualitative evaluation of how aircraft survive an accident. The main objective is to protect the passengers or valuable cargo from the damage caused by an accident. In the case of airliners the stressed skin of the pressurized fuselage provides this feature, but in the event of a nose or tail impact, large bending moments build all the way through the fuselage, causing fractures in the shell, causing the fuselage to break up into smaller sections. So the passenger aircraft are designed in such a way that seating arrangements are away from areas likely to be intruded in an accident, such as near a propeller, engine nacelle undercarriage etc. The interior of the cabin is also fitted with safety features such as oxygen masks that drop down in the event of loss of cabin pressure, lockable luggage compartments, safety belts, lifejackets, emergency doors and luminous floor strips. Aircraft are sometimes designed with emergency water landing in mind, for instance the Airbus A330 has a 'ditching' switch that closes valves and openings beneath the aircraft slowing the ingress of water.

== Design optimization ==
Aircraft designers normally rough-out the initial design with consideration of all the constraints on their design. Historically design teams used to be small, usually headed by a Chief Designer who knows all the design requirements and objectives and coordinated the team accordingly. As time progressed, the complexity of military and airline aircraft also grew. Modern military and airline design projects are of such a large scale that every design aspect is tackled by different teams and then brought together. In general aviation a large number of light aircraft are designed and built by amateur hobbyists and enthusiasts.

== Computer-aided design of aircraft ==
The external surfaces of an aircraft modelled in MATLAB

In the early years of aircraft design, designers generally used analytical theory to do the various engineering calculations that go into the design process along with a lot of experimentation. These calculations were labour-intensive and time-consuming. In the 1940s, several engineers started looking for ways to automate and simplify the calculation process and many relations and semi-empirical formulas were developed. Even after simplification, the calculations continued to be extensive. With the invention of the computer, engineers realized that a majority of the calculations could be automated, but the lack of design visualization and the huge amount of experimentation involved kept the field of aircraft design stagnant. With the rise of programming languages, engineers could now write programs that were tailored to design an aircraft. Originally this was done with mainframe computers and used low-level programming languages that required the user to be fluent in the language and know the architecture of the computer. With the introduction of personal computers, design programs began employing a more user-friendly approach.

== Design aspects ==
The main aspects of aircraft design are:

1. Aerodynamics
2. Propulsion
3. Controls
4. Mass
5. Structure

All aircraft designs involve compromises of these factors to achieve the design mission.

=== Wing design ===
The wing of a fixed-wing aircraft provides the lift necessary for flight. Wing geometry affects every aspect of an aircraft's flight. The wing area will usually be dictated by the desired stalling speed but the overall shape of the planform and other detail aspects may be influenced by wing layout factors. The wing can be mounted to the fuselage in high, low and middle positions. The wing design depends on many parameters such as selection of aspect ratio, taper ratio, sweepback angle, thickness ratio, section profile, washout and dihedral. The cross-sectional shape of the wing is its airfoil. The construction of the wing starts with the rib which defines the airfoil shape. Ribs can be made of wood, metal, plastic or even composites.

The wing must be designed and tested to ensure it can withstand the maximum loads imposed by maneuvering, and by atmospheric gusts.

=== Fuselage ===
The fuselage is the part of the aircraft that contains the cockpit, passenger cabin or cargo hold.

=== Propulsion ===
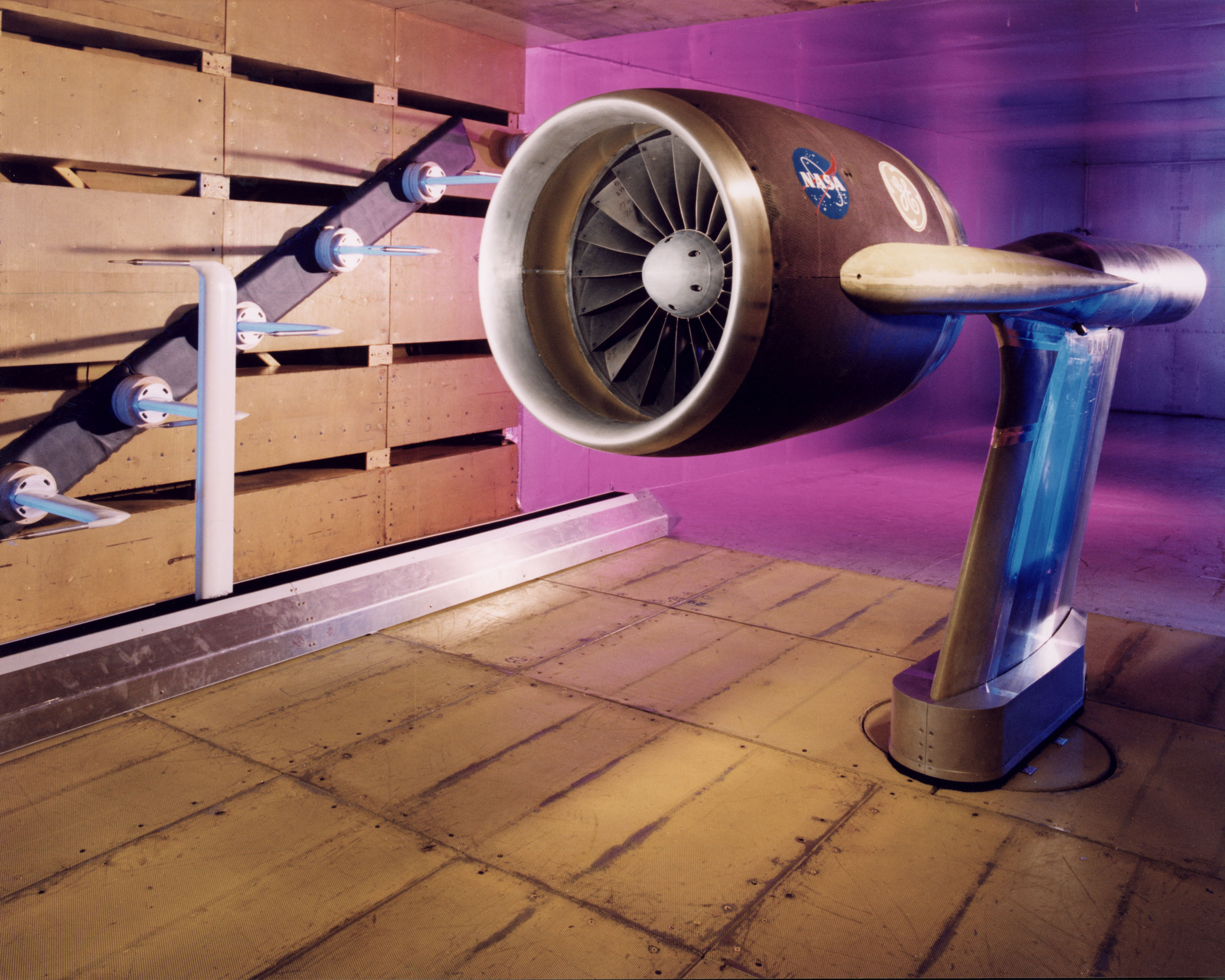
Aircraft engine being tested in a wind tunnel

Aircraft propulsion may be achieved by specially designed aircraft engines, adapted auto, motorcycle or snowmobile engines, electric engines or even human muscle power. The main parameters of engine design are:

- Maximum engine thrust available
- Fuel consumption
- Engine mass
- Engine geometry

The thrust provided by the engine must balance the drag at cruise speed and be greater than the drag to allow acceleration. The engine requirement varies with the type of aircraft. For instance, commercial airliners spend more time in cruise speed and need more engine efficiency. High-performance fighter jets need very high acceleration and therefore have very high thrust requirements.

=== Weight ===
The weight of the aircraft is the common factor that links all aspects of aircraft design such as aerodynamics, structure, and propulsion, all together. An aircraft's weight is derived from various factors such as empty weight, payload, useful load, etc. The various weights are used to then calculate the center of mass of the entire aircraft. The center of mass must fit within the established limits set by the manufacturer.

=== Structure ===
The aircraft structure focuses not only on strength, aeroelasticity, durability, damage tolerance, stability, but also on fail-safety, corrosion resistance, maintainability and ease of manufacturing. The structure must be able to withstand the stresses caused by cabin pressurization, if fitted, turbulence and engine or rotor vibrations.

== Design process and simulation ==
The design of any aircraft starts out in three phases.

=== Conceptual design ===
Conceptual design of a Bréguet 763 Deux-Ponts

Aircraft conceptual design involves sketching a variety of possible configurations that meet the required design specifications. By drawing a set of configurations, designers seek to reach the design configuration that satisfactorily meets all requirements as well as go hand in hand with factors such as aerodynamics, propulsion, flight performance, structural and control systems. This is called design optimization. Fundamental aspects such as fuselage shape, wing configuration and location, engine size and type are all determined at this stage. Constraints to design like those mentioned above are all taken into account at this stage as well. The final product is a conceptual layout of the aircraft configuration on paper or computer screen, to be reviewed by engineers and other designers.

=== Preliminary design phase ===
The design configuration arrived at in the conceptual design phase is then tweaked and remodeled to fit into the design parameters. In this phase, wind tunnel testing and computational fluid dynamic calculations of the flow field around the aircraft are done. Major structural and control analysis is also carried out in this phase. Aerodynamic flaws and structural instabilities if any are corrected and the final design is drawn and finalized. Then after the finalization of the design lies the key decision with the manufacturer or individual designing it whether to actually go ahead with the production of the aircraft. At this point several designs, though perfectly capable of flight and performance, might have been opted out of production due to their being economically nonviable.

=== Detail design phase ===
This phase simply deals with the fabrication aspect of the aircraft to be manufactured. It determines the number, design and location of ribs, spars, sections and other structural elements. All aerodynamic, structural, propulsion, control and performance aspects have already been covered in the preliminary design phase and only the manufacturing remains. Flight simulators for aircraft are also developed at this stage.

=== Delays ===
Some commercial aircraft have experienced significant schedule delays and cost overruns in the development phase. Examples of this include the Boeing 787 Dreamliner with a delay of 4 years with massive cost overruns, the Boeing 747-8 with a two-year delay, the Airbus A380 with a two-year delay and US$6.1 billion in cost overruns, the Airbus A350 with delays and cost overruns, the Bombardier C Series, Global 7000 and 8000, the Comac C919 with a four-year delay and the Mitsubishi Regional Jet, which was delayed by four years and ended up with empty weight issues.

Other aviation programs have also been delayed due to logistical issues, and also challenging technical hurdles. For example, Qantas's recent program Project Sunrise aims to connect cities like Sydney with New York through non-stop flights. The aircraft that they chose was the Airbus A350-1000, which provided enough space whilst being fuel-efficient. However, safety regulations hindered the progress of this aircraft due to having to build an extra fuel tank at the back to accommodate for the longer journey, which pushed up to 23 hours.

== Program development ==
An existing aircraft program can be developed for performance and economy gains by stretching the fuselage, increasing the MTOW, enhancing the aerodynamics, installing new engines, new wings or new avionics. For a 9,100 nmi long range at Mach 0.8/FL360, a 10% lower TSFC saves 13% of fuel, a 10% L/D increase saves 12%, a 10% lower OEW saves 6% and all combined saves 28%.

=== Re-engine ===
Jet airliners
Base	Previous engines	First flight	Re-engined	New engines	First flight
DC-8 Super 60	JT3D	May 30, 1958	DC-8 Super 70	CFM56	1982
Boeing 737 Original	JT8D	Apr 9, 1967	Boeing 737 Classic	CFM56	Feb 24, 1984
Fokker F28	Rolls-Royce Spey	May 9, 1967	Fokker 100/70	Rolls-Royce Tay	Nov 30, 1986
Boeing 747	JT9D/CF6-50/RB211-524	Feb 9, 1969	Boeing 747-400	PW4000/CF6-80/RB211-524G/H	Apr 29, 1988
Douglas DC-10	JT9D/CF6-50	Aug 29, 1970	MD-11	PW4000/CF6-80	Jan 10, 1990
Douglas DC-9/MD-80	JT8D	Feb 25, 1965	MD-90	V2500	Feb 22, 1993
Boeing 737 Classic	CFM56-3	Feb 24, 1984	Boeing 737 NG	CFM56-7	Feb 9, 1997
Boeing 747-400	PW4000/CF6/RB211	Apr 29, 1988	Boeing 747-8	GEnx-2b	Feb 8, 2010
Airbus A320	CFM56/V2500	Feb 22, 1987	Airbus A320neo	CFM LEAP/PW1100G	Sep 25, 2014
Boeing 737 NG	CFM56-7	Feb 9, 1997	Boeing 737 MAX	CFM LEAP	Jan 29, 2016
Embraer E-Jet	CF34	Feb 19, 2002	Embraer E-Jet E2	PW1000G	May 23, 2016
Airbus A330	CF6/PW4000/Trent 700	Nov 2, 1992	Airbus A330neo	Trent 7000	Oct 19, 2017
Boeing 777	GE90/PW4000/Trent 800	Jun 12, 1994	Boeing 777X	GE9X	Jan 25, 2020

=== Fuselage stretch ===
Jet airliners
Base	Base length	First flight	Stretched	Stretched length	First flight
Boeing 737-100	28.65 m (94.00 ft)	Apr 9, 1967	737-200	30.5 m (100.2 ft)	Aug 8, 1967
Boeing 737-100	28.65 m (94.00 ft)	Apr 9, 1967	737-500/600	31.00–31.24 m (101.71–102.49 ft)	
Boeing 737-100	28.65 m (94.00 ft)	Apr 9, 1967	737-300/700	33.4–33.63 m (109.6–110.3 ft)	
Boeing 737-100	28.65 m (94.00 ft)	Apr 9, 1967	737 MAX 7	35.56 m (116.7 ft)	
Boeing 737-100	28.65 m (94.00 ft)	Apr 9, 1967	737-400	36.40 m (119.4 ft)	
Boeing 737-100	28.65 m (94.00 ft)	Apr 9, 1967	737-800/MAX 8	39.47 m (129.5 ft)	
Boeing 737-100	28.65 m (94.00 ft)	Apr 9, 1967	737-900/MAX 9	42.11 m (138.2 ft)	
Boeing 737-100	28.65 m (94.00 ft)	Apr 9, 1967	737 MAX 10	43.80 m (143.7 ft)	plan. 2020
Boeing 747-100/200/300/400	70.66 m (231.8 ft)	Feb 9, 1969	Boeing 747SP	56.3 m (185 ft)	Jul 4, 1975
Boeing 747-100/200/300/400	70.66 m (231.8 ft)	Feb 9, 1969	Boeing 747-8	76.25 m (250.2 ft)	Feb 8, 2010
Boeing 757	47.3 m (155 ft)	Feb 19, 1982	Boeing 757-300	54.4 m (178 ft)	
Boeing 767-200/ER	48.51 m (159.2 ft)	Sep 26, 1981	Boeing 767-300/ER	54.94 m (180.2 ft)	
Boeing 767-200/ER	48.51 m (159.2 ft)	Sep 26, 1981	Boeing 767-400ER	61.37 m (201.3 ft)	
Boeing 777-200/ER/LR	63.73 m (209.1 ft)	Jun 12, 1994	Boeing 777X-8	69.8 m (229 ft)	
Boeing 777-200/ER/LR	63.73 m (209.1 ft)	Jun 12, 1994	Boeing 777-300/ER	73.86 m (242.3 ft)	Oct 16, 1997
Boeing 777-200/ER/LR	63.73 m (209.1 ft)	Jun 12, 1994	Boeing 777X-9	76.7 m (252 ft)	Jan 25, 2020
Boeing 787-8	56.72 m (186.08 ft)	Dec 15, 2009	Boeing 787-9	62.81 m (206.08 ft)	Sep 17, 2013
Boeing 787-8	56.72 m (186.08 ft)	Dec 15, 2009	Boeing 787-10	68.28 m (224 ft)	Mar 31, 2017
Airbus A300	53.61–54.08 m (175.9–177.4 ft)	Oct 28, 1972	Airbus A310	46.66 m (153.1 ft)	Apr 3, 1982
Airbus A320 (neo)	37.57 m (123.3 ft)	Feb 22, 1987	Airbus A318	31.44 m (103.1 ft)	Jan 15, 2002
Airbus A320 (neo)	37.57 m (123.3 ft)	Feb 22, 1987	Airbus A319 (neo)	33.84 m (111.0 ft)	Aug 25, 1995
Airbus A320 (neo)	37.57 m (123.3 ft)	Feb 22, 1987	Airbus A321 (neo)	44.51 m (146.0 ft)	Mar 11, 1993
Airbus A330-300/900	63.67 m (208.9 ft)	Nov 2, 1992	Airbus A330-200/800	58.82 m (193.0 ft)	Aug 13, 1997
Airbus A340-300	63.69 m (209.0 ft)	Oct 25, 1991	Airbus A340-200	59.40 m (194.9 ft)	Apr 1, 1992
Airbus A340-300	63.69 m (209.0 ft)	Oct 25, 1991	Airbus A340-500	67.93 m (222.9 ft)	Feb 11, 2002
Airbus A340-300	63.69 m (209.0 ft)	Oct 25, 1991	Airbus A340-600	75.36 m (247.2 ft)	Apr 23, 2001
Airbus A350-900	66.61 m (218.5 ft)	Jun 14, 2013	A350-1000	73.59 m (241.4 ft)	Nov 24, 2016

== See also ==
- Aerospace engineering
- Aircraft manufacturer
- Dream Airplanes
- Index of aviation articles
- Iron bird (aviation)
