= Noshiro Rocket Testing Center =

Rockets facility of JAXA

- 能代ロケット実験場

- Location within Akita Prefecture Location within Japan

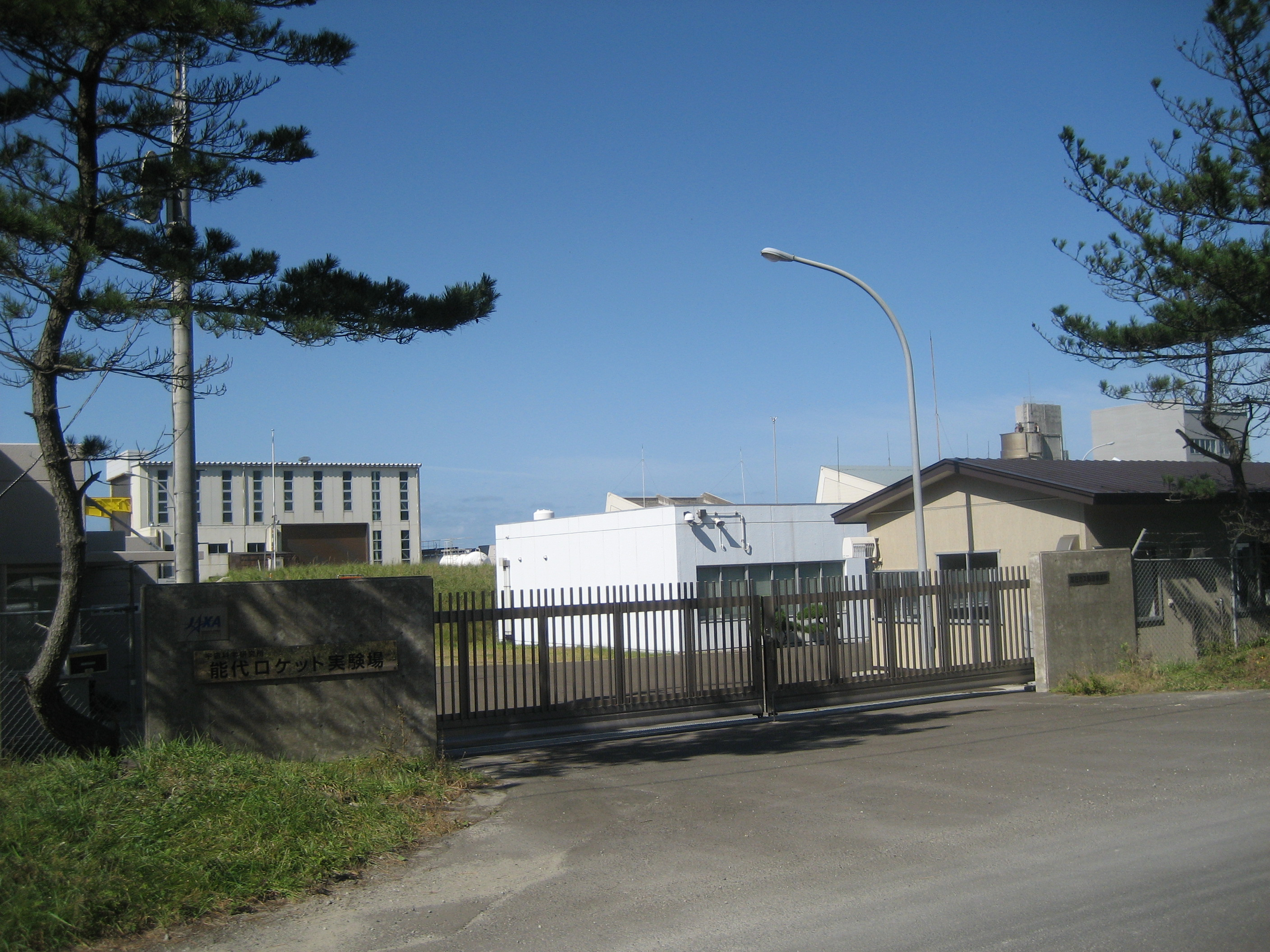
- Noshiro Rocket testing site

Agency overview
- Formed: 1962
- Jurisdiction: Japanese government
- Headquarters: Noshiro, Akita, Japan; 40°10′09″N 139°59′31″E
- Parent agency: JAXA
- Website: home page

The Noshiro Rocket Testing Center (能代ロケット実験場, Noshiro Roketto Jikkenjo) is a facility of the Japan Aerospace Exploration Agency (JAXA), located on the coast of the Sea of Japan in the city of Noshiro in Akita Prefecture, Japan.

== History ==
The Noshiro Rocket Testing Center (NTC) was established in 1962 as one of the affiliated facilities of the Institute of Industrial Science of the University of Tokyo, which became the Institute of Space and Astronautical Science (ISAS) in 1964. The testing center was involved in the development and testing of sounding rockets and the solid-fuel rocket engines which were used on the Mu series of launch vehicles.

From 1975, the Noshiro Testing Center was involved in the research, development and testing of liquid-fuel rocket engines. With the M-V launch vehicle program, the facilities were extensively upgraded with a large solid motor air combustion test building and an upper motor high altitude performance test facility completed by 1992. The static firing test for the M-V rocket engines took place at Noshiro.

In addition, a successful static test firing of the ATREX, an experimental precooled jet engine that works as a turbojet at low speeds and a ramjet up to Mach 6.0 occurred in 1992. From 1998, the site has been active in the Reusable Vehicle Testing program to develop an air-breathing engine which uses less fuel than a rocket and can therefore transport a larger payload.
