= Engine test stand =

Facility used to test engines

An engine test stand is a facility used to develop, characterize and test engines. The facility, often offered as a product to automotive OEMs, allows engine operation in different operating regimes and offers measurement of several physical variables associated with the engine operation.

A sophisticated engine test stand houses several sensors (or transducers), data acquisition features and actuators to control the engine state. The sensors would measure several physical variables of interest which typically include:

- crankshaft torque and angular velocity
- intake air and fuel consumption rates, often detected using volumetric and/or gravimetric measurement methods
- air-fuel ratio for the intake mixture, often detected using an exhaust gas oxygen sensor
- environment pollutant concentrations in the exhaust gas such as carbon monoxide, different configurations of hydrocarbons and nitrogen oxides, sulfur dioxide, and particulate matter
- temperatures and gas pressures at several locations on the engine body such as engine oil temperature, spark plug temperature, exhaust gas temperature, intake manifold pressure
- atmospheric conditions such as temperature, pressure, and humidity

Information gathered through the sensors is often processed and logged through data acquisition systems. Actuators allow for attaining a desired engine state (often characterized as a unique combination of engine torque and speed). For gasoline engines, the actuators may include an intake throttle actuator, a loading device for the engine such as an induction motor. The engine test stands are often custom-packaged considering requirements of the OEM customer. They often include microcontroller-based feedback control systems with following features:

- closed-loop desired speed operation (useful towards characterization of steady-state or transient engine performance)
- closed-loop desired torque operation (useful towards emulation of in-vehicle, on-road scenarios, thereby enabling an alternate way of characterization of steady-state or transient engine performance)

== Engine test stand applications ==
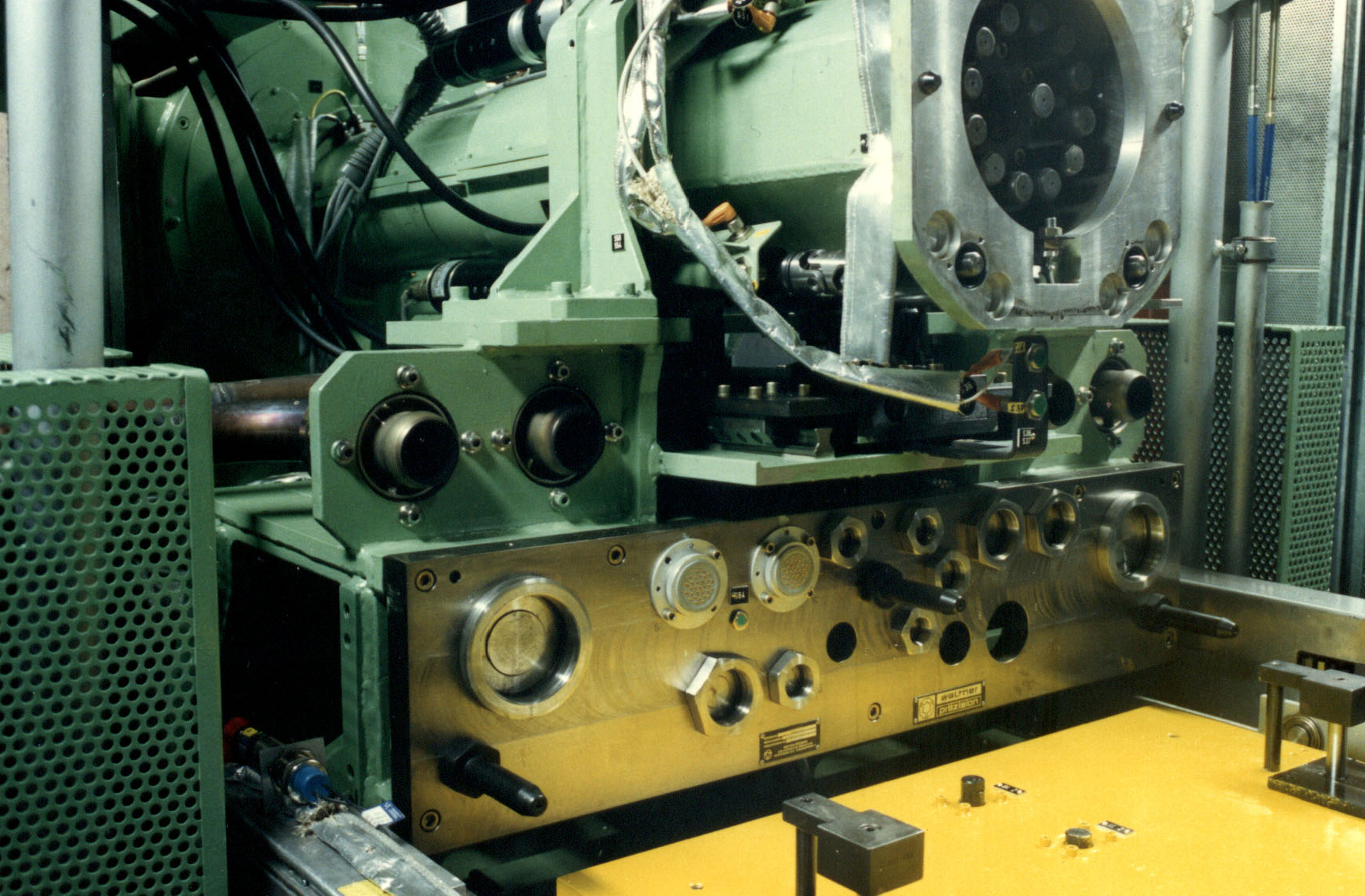
Engine Test Stand with WALTHER-PRAEZISION Multicoupling System

- Research and Development of engines, typically at an OEM laboratory
- Tuning of in-use engines, typically at service centers or for racing applications
- End of production line at an OEM factory. The changing of the engines to be tested takes place automatically, and fluid, electrical and exhaust gas lines are connected to the test stand and engine and disconnected from them by means of docking systems. When the engine docks in the test stand the mechanical drive shaft is automatically connected to it.

== Engine testing for research and development ==
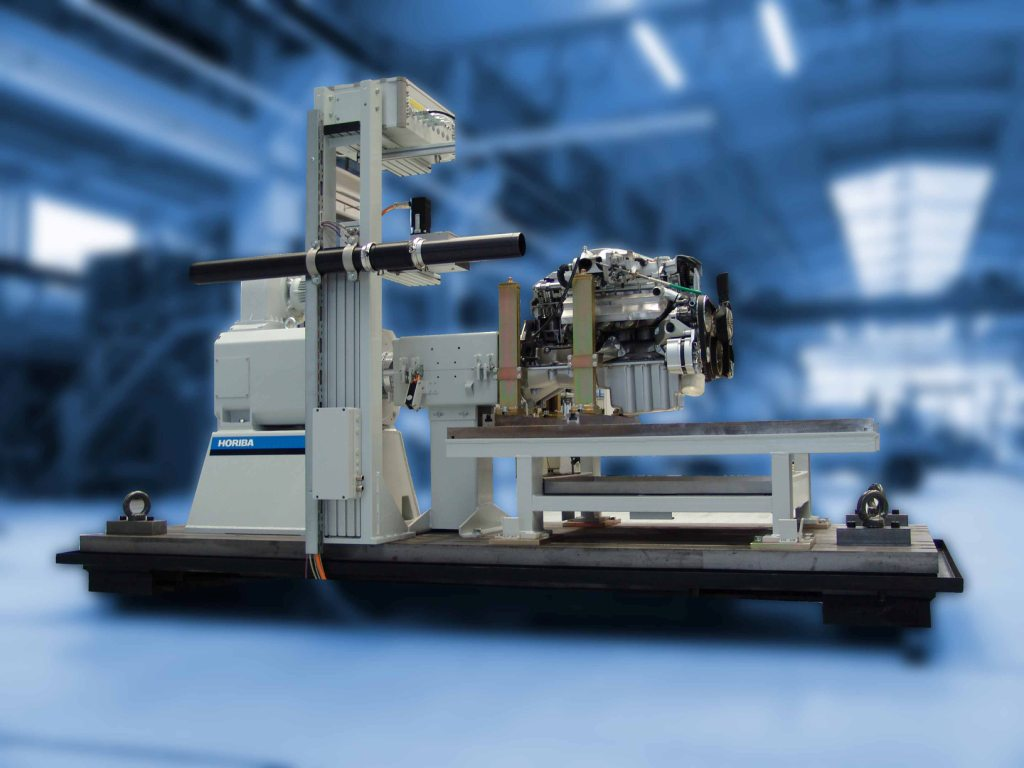
HORIBA engine test stand type TITAN

Research and Development (R&D) activities on engines at automobile OEMs have necessitated sophisticated engine test stands. Automobile OEMs are usually interested in developing engines that meet the following threefold objectives:

- to provide high fuel efficiency
- to improve drivability and durability
- to be in compliance to relevant emission legislation

Consequently, an R&D engine test stands allow for a full-fledged engine development exercise through measurement, control and record of several relevant engine variables.

Typical tests include ones that:

- determine fuel efficiency and drivability: torque-speed performance test under steady-state and transient conditions
- determine durability: ageing tests, oil and lubrication tests
- determine compliance to relevant emission legislations: volumetric and mass emission tests over stated emission test cycles
- gain further knowledge about the engine itself: engine mapping exercise or development of multidimensional input-output maps among different engine variables. e.g. a map from intake manifold pressure and engine speed to intake air flow rate.

== Magnifying LDV sensors in engine testing ==
Spark plug velocimeter - SPV

Laser technology adds useful tools to improve engine design during engine testing. Lasers sensors using laser Doppler velocimetry with magnifying LDV sensors can record the movements of gas particles during the entire 2-stroke, 4-stroke or rotary combustion cycle. These spark plug velocimeter (SPV) sensors can be inserted into the spark plug hole of the combustion chamber of the engine. The sensors can be adjusted to all depth levels of the pistons movement - typically ranging from 0 - 50mm.

The magnifying LDV sensors will record the velocity and direction of the movement of gas particles. Engine design can then be optimised with the recorded data and the visualisation of the combustion cycle. The flow and direction of the gas particles can be improved by changing shape and sizes of the chamber, valves, spark plug, injectors and pistons resulting in improved combustion and performance and in reduced emissions.

Engine heads with two spark plug holes per cylinder can be used to record the velocity and direction of the movement of gas particles in an engine running under live, firing conditions.

SPVs can also be added to the intake and the exhaust to record flow of particles in these areas to further improve engine design.

Magnifying LDV sensors have been used in even more extreme situations to measure particle flow in rocket engines.

== See also ==
- Air flow meter
- Driveshaft
- Driving cycle
- Dynamometer
- Electromagnetic brake Article about eddy current dynos
- Emission standard
- Emission test cycle
- Engine cart
- Iron bird (aviation)
- Rocket engine test facility
- Testbed aircraft
