= Service structure =

Structure built on a rocket launch pad to service launch vehicles

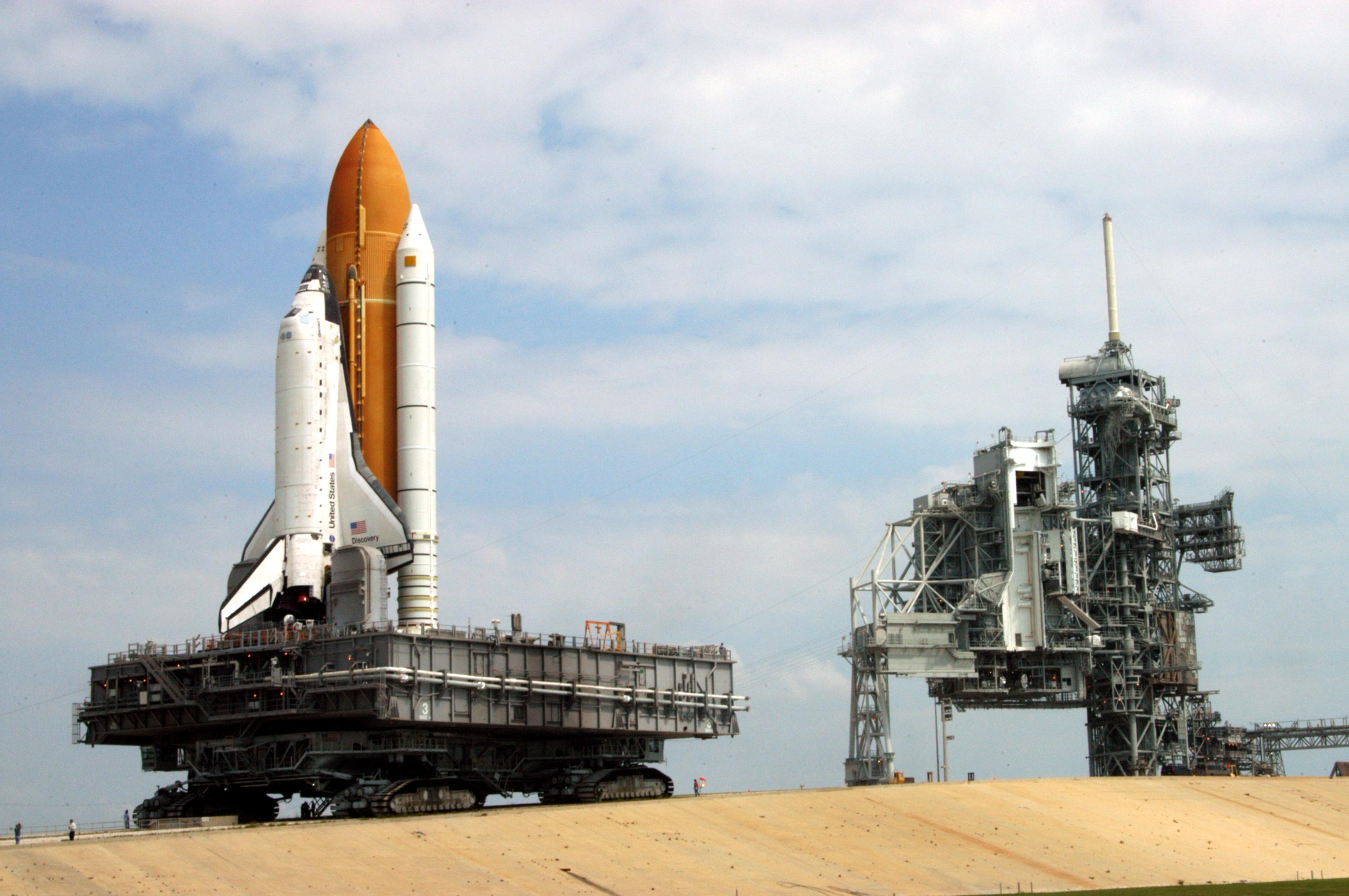
Space Shuttle Discovery is carried by a Crawler-transporter, a launch tower is visible in the background

A service structure is a permanent steel framework or tower erected on a rocket launch pad that allows assembly, servicing, and crew onboarding of the launch vehicle prior to liftoff.

In NASA launches at the Kennedy Space Center, astronauts enter the vehicle through a type of service structure called an "umbilical tower". Immediately before ignition of the rocket's engines, all connections between the tower and the craft are severed, and the connecting bridges swing away to prevent damage to structure and vehicle. An elevator in the tower also allows maintenance crew to service the vehicle.

== Kennedy Space Center ==
During the NASA Space Shuttle program, the structures at the Launch Complex 39 pads contained a two-piece access tower system, the Fixed Service Structure (FSS) and the Rotating Service Structure (RSS). The FSS permitted access to the Shuttle via a retractable arm and a "beanie cap" to capture vented liquid oxygen (LOX) from the external fuel tank. The RSS contained the Payload Changeout Room, which offered "clean" access to the orbiter's payload bay, protection from the elements, and protection in winds up to 60 knots (110 km/h).

The FSS on Pad 39A was repurposed the top of the umbilical tower of Mobile Launcher 2, while the FSS on 39B re-used the umbilical tower of Mobile Launcher 3. Mobile Launcher 3 would later become Mobile Launcher Platform 1 for the Shuttle.

In 2011 NASA removed both the FSS and RSS from LC-39B to make way for a new generation of launch vehicles. In 2017-2018 SpaceX removed the RSS from LC-39A and modified the FSS for its new series of launch vehicles.

Certain rockets such as the Delta and the Saturn V use structures consisting of a fixed portion and a mobile portion; the former is the umbilical tower and the latter is known as the "mobile service tower" or "mobile service structure," but often referred to as a gantry. This mobile structure is moved away from the vehicle several hours before launch.

=== White room ===
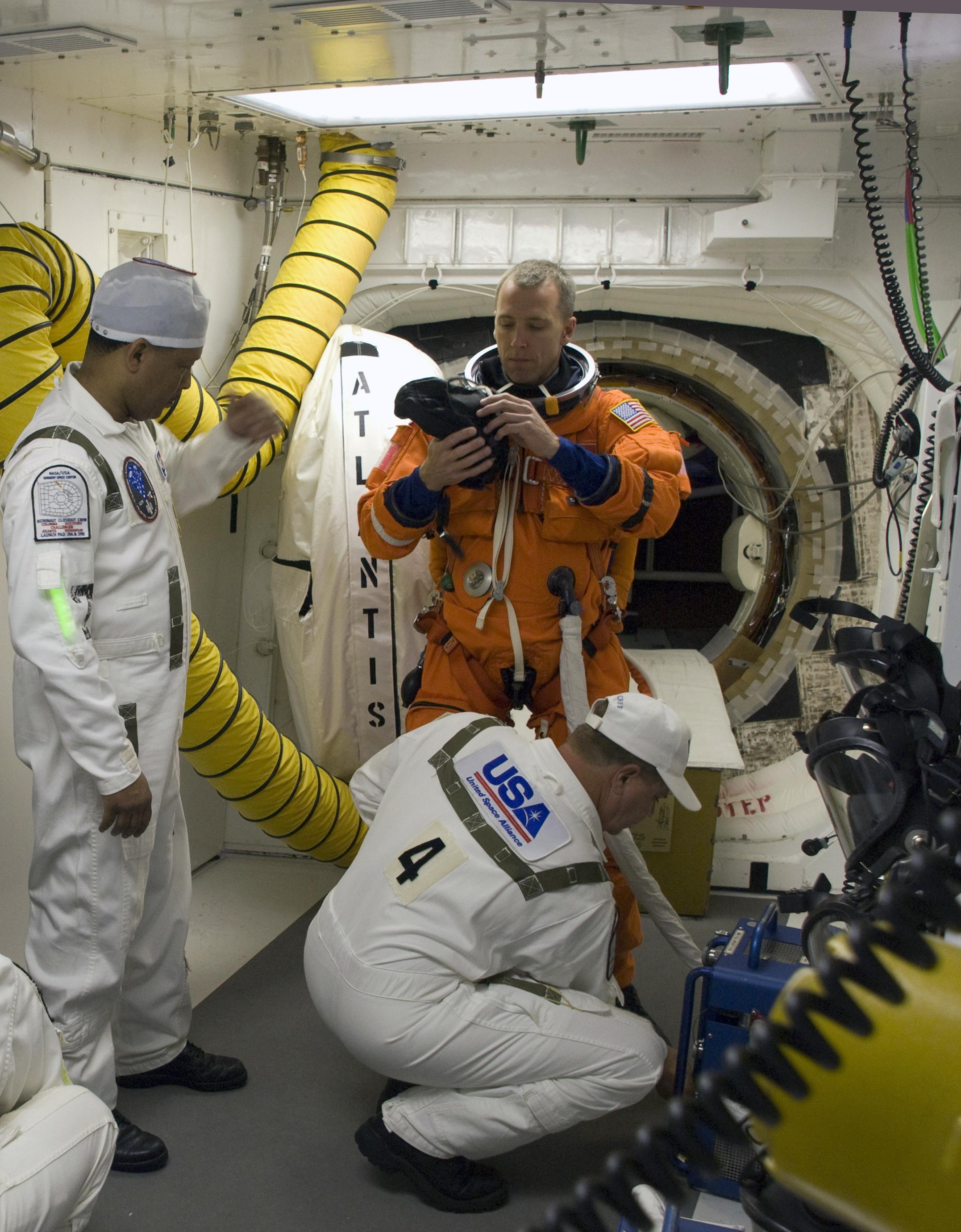
Closeout crew members help astronaut Andrew Feustel in the Launch Complex 39 white room prior to launch of STS-125

The white room was the small area used by astronauts to access the spacecraft during human flights up through the Space Shuttle program. The room takes its name from its white paint, which was used in Project Gemini. The room was first used in Project Mercury. Its use and white color (since Gemini) continued through subsequent programs of Apollo and the Space Shuttle.

Astronauts and closeout crew made their final preparations before liftoff, such as donning parachute packs, putting on spacesuit helmets, and detaching portable air-conditioning units. In 2014, NASA planned to move the White Room to a museum. As of the 2020 Crew Dragon Demo-2 mission, SpaceX began calling the equivalent area of its Crew Access Arm at LC-39A the "White Room" in recognition of the original NASA structure's significance. On the first launch attempt, NASA and SpaceX flight crew began signing their respective "meatball" NASA insignia or SpaceX logos at the end of the Crew Access Arm, a practice which has become a tradition.

== Baikonur Cosmodrome ==
Similarly, Soviet-and Russian-designed service structures such as those at Baikonur Cosmodrome Site 31 feature rotating crane-like "tower arms" that stand upright to service and secure the vehicle. The tower arms then pivot outward away from the rocket at launch.
