= Glynn Lunney =

NASA engineer (1936–2021)

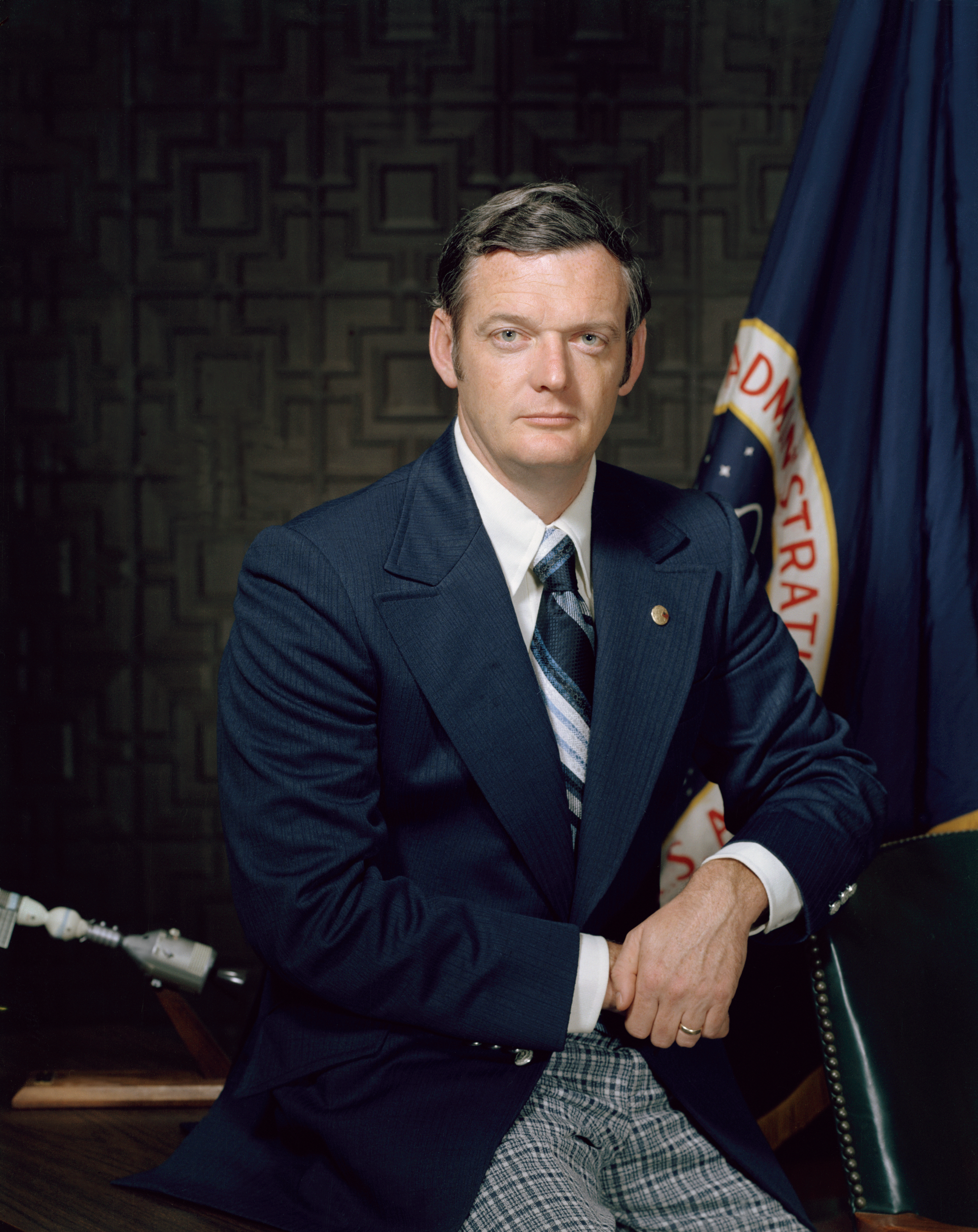
- Glynn Lunney in 1974, as manager of the Apollo–Soyuz Test Project
- Born: Glynn Stephen Lunney; November 27, 1936; Old Forge, Lackawanna County, Pennsylvania, U.S.
- Died: March 19, 2021 (aged 84); Clear Lake, Texas, U.S.
- Education: University of Detroit Mercy, B.S. 1958
- Occupations: NASA manager and flight director
- Spouse: Marilyn Kurtz Lunney
- Children: 4
- Awards: Presidential Medal of Freedom (1970); Allan D. Emil Memorial Award (1978)

Signature
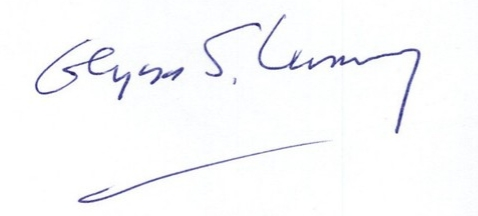

Glynn Stephen Lunney (November 27, 1936 – March 19, 2021) was an American NASA engineer. Lunney was an employee of NASA since its creation in 1958, a flight director during the Gemini and Apollo programs. Lunney was on duty during historic events such as the Apollo 11 lunar ascent and the pivotal hours of the Apollo 13 crisis. At the end of the Apollo program, he became manager of the Apollo–Soyuz Test Project, the first collaboration in spaceflight between the United States and the Soviet Union. Later, he served as manager of the Space Shuttle program before leaving NASA in 1985 and later becoming a vice president of the United Space Alliance.

Lunney was a key figure in the US human spaceflight program from Project Mercury through the coming of the Space Shuttle. He received numerous awards for his work, including the National Space Trophy, which he was given by the Rotary Club in 2005. Chris Kraft, NASA's first flight director, described Lunney as "a true hero of the space age", saying that he was "one of the outstanding contributors to the exploration of space of the last four decades".

== Early life and NACA career ==
Glynn Stephen Lunney was born in the coal city of Old Forge, Lackawanna County, Pennsylvania, on November 27, 1936, the eldest son of William Lunney, a welder and former miner who encouraged his son to get an education and to find a job beyond the mines, and his wife Helen Glynn Lunney. He graduated from the Scranton Preparatory School in 1953.

A childhood interest in model airplanes prompted Lunney to study engineering in college. After attending the University of Scranton (1953–1955), he transferred to the University of Detroit, where he enrolled in the cooperative training program run by the Lewis Research Center in Cleveland, Ohio. The center was a part of the National Advisory Committee for Aeronautics (NACA), a United States federal agency founded to promote aeronautical research. Cooperative students at NACA took part in a program that combined work and study, providing a way for them to fund their college degrees while gaining experience in aeronautics. Lunney graduated from college in June 1958, with a Bachelor of Science degree in aerospace engineering.

After graduation, Lunney remained with NACA. His first job was as a researcher in aerospace dynamics at Lewis Research Center, where he worked with a team studying the thermodynamics of vehicles during high-speed reentry. Using a B-57 Canberra bomber, the team sent small rockets high into the atmosphere in order to measure their heating profile.

== NASA career ==
=== Mercury ===
Only a month after Lunney graduated, President Eisenhower signed into existence the National Aeronautics and Space Administration (NASA), into which NACA was subsumed. His timing was perfect, for as Lunney later said, "there was no such thing as space flight until the month I got out of college". Lunney was soon transferred to Langley Research Center in Hampton, Virginia, where in September 1959 he became a member of the Space Task Group, which was the body given responsibility for the creation of NASA's human spaceflight program. Aged twenty-one, he was the youngest of the forty-five members of the group. His first assignment was with the Control Center Simulation Group, which planned the simulations used to train both flight controllers and astronauts for the as-yet unknown experience of human spaceflight.

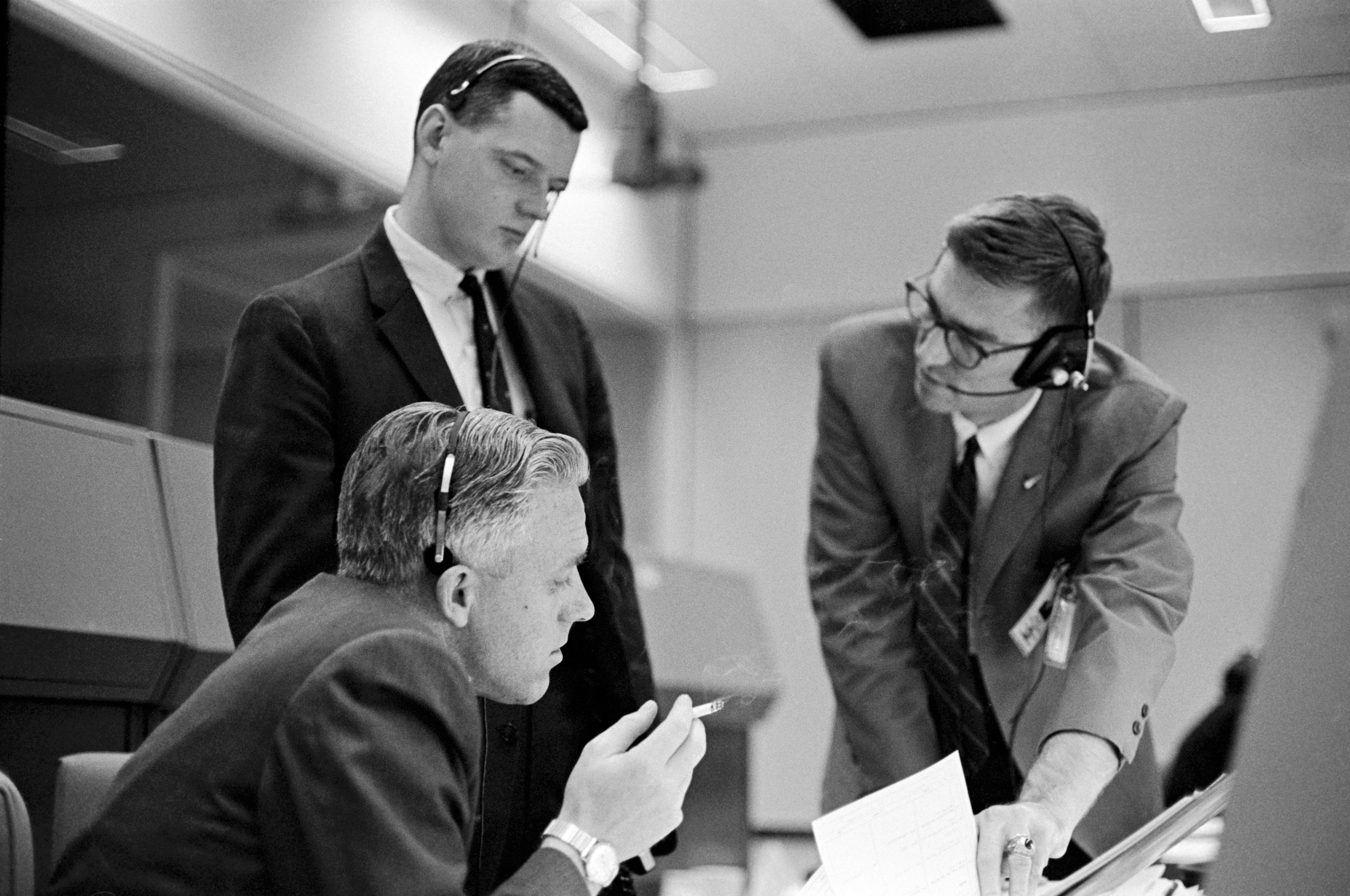
Lunney (top left) with John Hodge and Jones Roach during Gemini 3

A member of the Flight Operations Division, Lunney was one of the engineers responsible for planning and creating procedures for Project Mercury, America's first human spaceflight program. He took part in the writing of the first set of mission rules, the guidelines by which both flight controllers and astronauts operated. During Mercury, Lunney became, after Tecwyn Roberts, the second man to serve as the Flight Dynamics Officer (FIDO) in the Mercury Control Center, controlling the trajectory of the spacecraft and planning adjustments to it.

Lunney's colleague Gene Kranz described him as "the pioneer leader of trajectory operations, who turned his craft from an art practiced by a few into a pure science". It was during these years that Lunney became the protege of flight director Chris Kraft. He was sometimes referred to as "the son of Chris Kraft."

Lunney worked both in the Control Center and at remote sites; during the flight of John Glenn, America's first orbital spaceflight, he was serving as the FIDO in Bermuda. In September 1961, NASA's Space Task Group was reorganized into the Manned Spacecraft Center and moved to Houston, Texas, and Lunney moved with it. In Houston, he became head of the Mission Logic and Computer Hardware section, where he defined and oversaw the computing and display requirements of the flight dynamics division within the new Mission Control Center.

=== Gemini ===
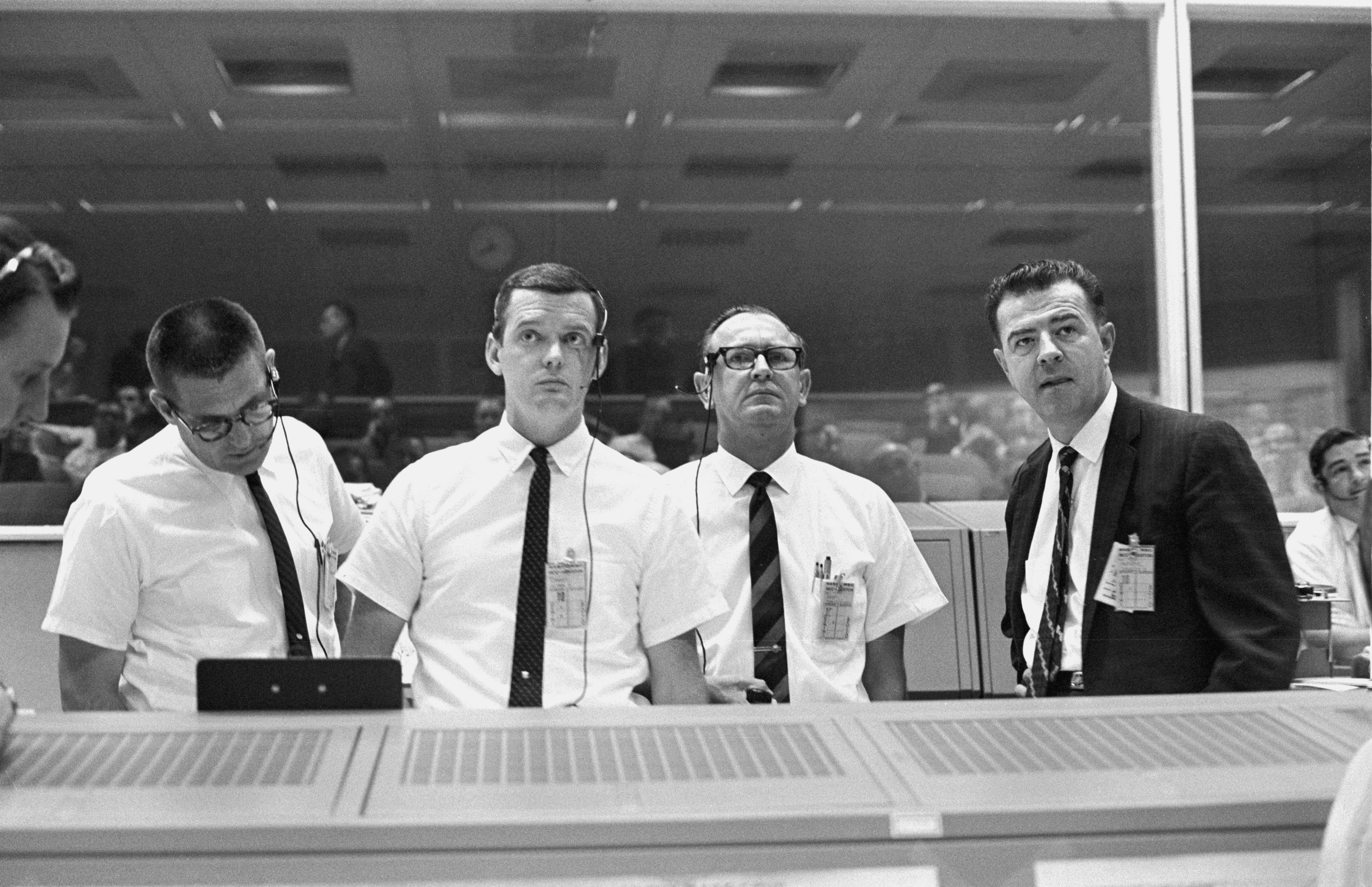
Standing at the flight director's console, viewing the Gemini 10 flight display in the Mission Control Center. Left to right: William C. Schneider, Glynn Lunney, Christopher C. Kraft Jr. and Charles W. Mathews.

Gemini was a step forward for NASA's human spaceflight program: the Gemini capsule was larger and more advanced than Mercury, capable of supporting two men for up to a two-week mission. Because of the longer mission durations, Mission Control began to be staffed in shifts. In 1964, Lunney and Kranz were selected by Kraft to join him and his deputy John Hodge as flight directors. Aged only twenty-eight, Lunney was the youngest of the four.

Lunney was stationed in Bermuda for the uncrewed Gemini 2 mission. He worked backup on Gemini 3, taking charge of the newly established Mission Control Center in Houston, at a time when flights were still controlled from Cape Canaveral in Florida. On Gemini 4, he again was working backup, this time in Florida, supporting the first mission that was controlled entirely from Houston. After spending some time on uncrewed testing for the Apollo program, he returned to work as a flight director on Gemini 9 and Gemini 11 and lead flight director on, Gemini 10 and Gemini 12.

=== Apollo ===
As with Project Mercury, Lunney was involved in Project Apollo right from the beginning. He took charge of the "boilerplate" tests of the Apollo abort escape system at White Sands, which took place during the Gemini program, and was flight director during the first uncrewed Saturn V test flight, SA-501.

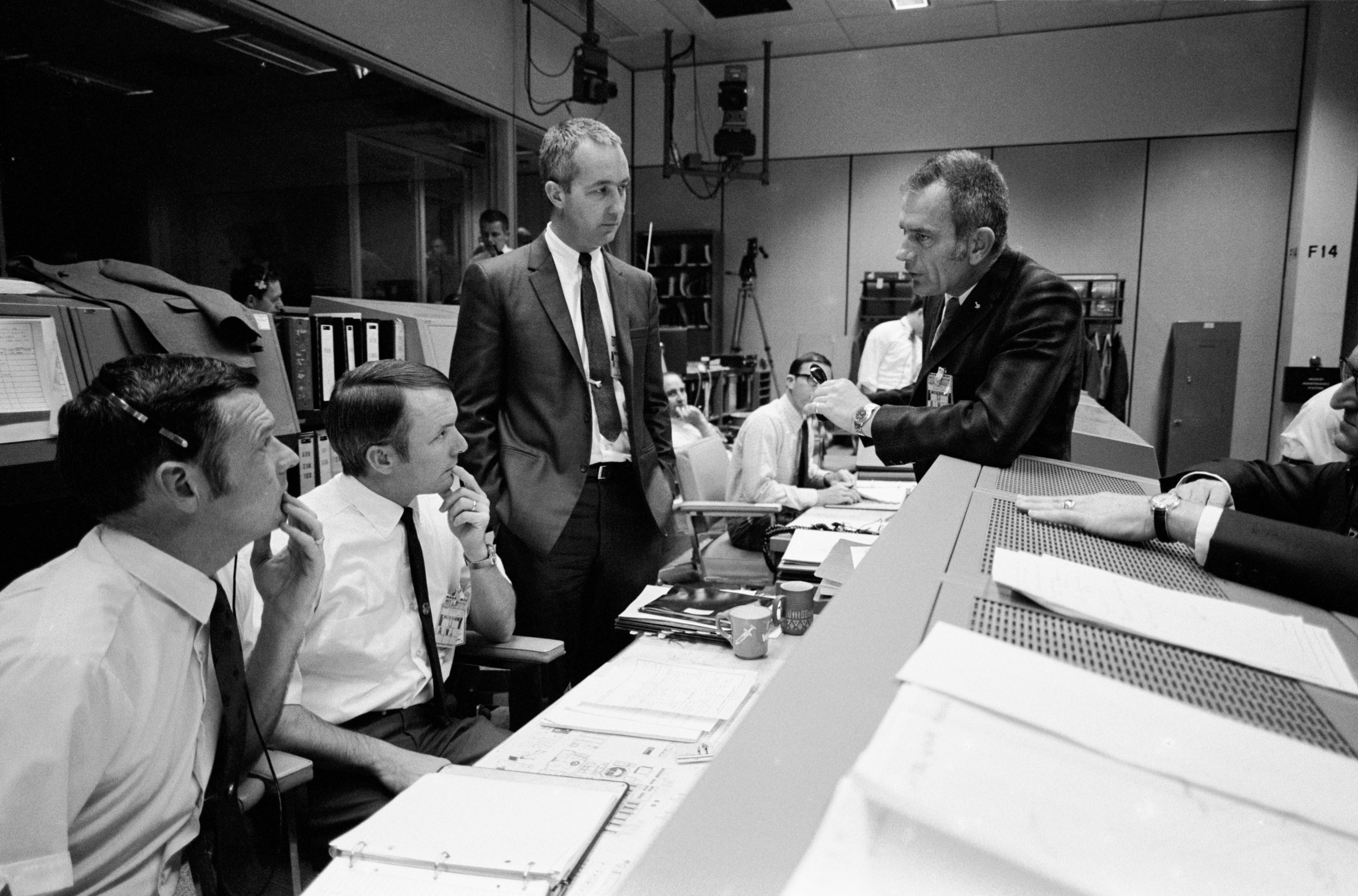
Discussion in the Mission Operations Control Room during the Apollo 13 mission between Lunney (left) and astronauts James McDivitt and Deke Slayton

Lunney was not scheduled to serve as a flight director on the first crewed Apollo mission, later known as Apollo 1. During the countdown demonstration test that resulted in the Apollo 1 fire, Lunney was at home having dinner with astronaut Bill Anders and his wife, and was called into Mission Control when the fire occurred. It was, as he recalled, "a tremendous punch in the stomach to all of us".

The aftermath of the fire, in which three astronauts were killed, left Lunney and his colleagues at NASA feeling that they had perhaps failed to recognize the risks they were running in their efforts to meet Kennedy's timetable of landing a man on the Moon by the end of the decade and bringing him safely back to Earth. "Maybe," said Lunney over thirty years later, "we had gotten a little overconfident".

Lunney attracted significant media attention in 1968, when he worked as lead flight director on Apollo 7, the first of the crewed Apollo flights. Coming as it did after the Apollo 1 fire, the mission was an important test for the Apollo program, and was stressful for astronauts and controllers alike. Lunney had primary responsibility for dealing with the mission commander, Wally Schirra, who repeatedly questioned orders from the ground. Although pressed by reporters in news conferences, Lunney stayed diplomatic and said nothing critical of Schirra.

Privately, however, he was exasperated, and later assured his team of young controllers that "manned spaceflight is usually better than this". He was diplomatic about Donn Eisele's sarcastic comment to the CAPCOM that he would "like to meet the man, or whomever it was, that dreamed up that little gem." The "gem" turned out to be Lunney's.

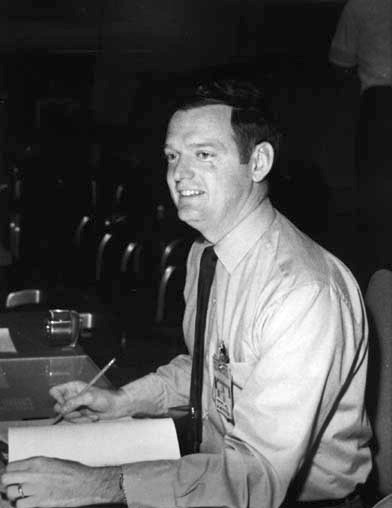
Lunney on console during the Apollo 16 mission

As a flight director Lunney was known for his good memory and his unusually quick thought processes—traits that could sometimes prove problematic for his team of flight controllers. "Glynn would drive you crazy", said Jay Greene, a fellow controller, "because his mind would race so fast that he could churn out action items quicker than you could absorb, much less answer." He was the lead flight director again during the Apollo 10 mission, a dress rehearsal for the Apollo 11 Moon landing.

During the Apollo 13 crisis, Lunney played a key role. Coming on shift an hour after the oxygen tank explosion that put the crew's lives in jeopardy, Lunney and his team faced the unprecedented challenge of having to power up the Lunar Module on an extremely tight timeline, while transferring guidance and navigation data to it from the dying command module. His excellent memory and quick thinking were critical in the success of his team during the ensuing hours. Ken Mattingly, the astronaut who had been bumped from the Apollo 13 crew due to his exposure to German measles, later called Lunney's performance "the most magnificent display of personal leadership that I've ever seen."

On the day following the Apollo 13 splashdown, Lunney joined his fellow flight directors in accepting the Presidential Medal of Freedom as a member of the Apollo 13 mission operations team.

=== Apollo–Soyuz Test Program ===
In 1970, while still a flight director, Lunney was selected as one of the members of a NASA delegation to the Soviet Union, which was to discuss the possibility of cooperation between the two countries in the field of human spaceflight. "For me it was out of the clear blue sky", said Lunney, who was told of the plans while at a conference in early October. "I did not know anything about [the proposed talks] until that time."

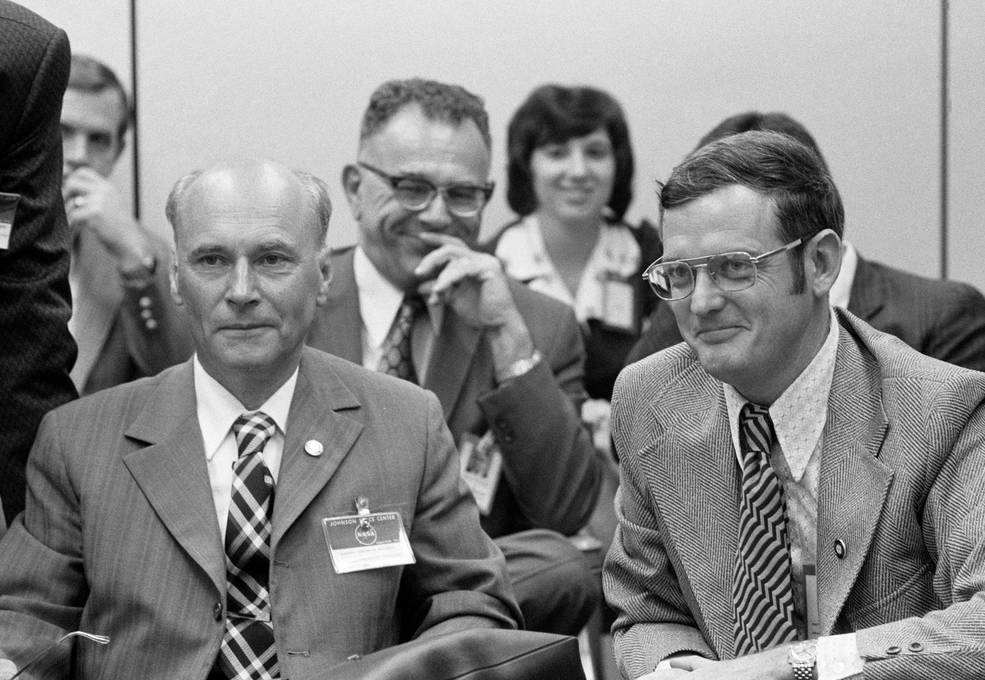
ASTP Project Directors Bushuyev (left) and Glynn Lunney during a meeting in Houston in 1973

The trip took place in late October. While in Moscow, Lunney gave a presentation to Soviet engineers on the techniques that NASA used for orbital rendezvous, and on the compromises that would have to be made in order to achieve a rendezvous between American and Soviet spacecraft. The technical agreement that he helped to draft laid the groundwork for the mission which was to become the Apollo–Soyuz Test Project (ASTP). It was intended to be a joint mission, whose highlight was to be a docking between an American Apollo spacecraft and a Soviet Soyuz.

Lunney was named technical director of the ASTP in the following year. As technical director, he made several more trips to the Soviet Union, helping to negotiate the seventeen-point agreement that would govern the conduct of the mission. He also took part in working groups in Houston that dealt with the technical details of the project. A New York Times profile reported that he was taking Russian lessons in order to be better prepared for the role.

On June 13, 1972, Lunney was given overall responsibility for the test project; henceforth he would be in charge not only of building a partnership with the Soviets, but also of mission planning and of negotiating with North American Rockwell, the spacecraft contractor. According to the official history of the ASTP, Lunney's performance during Apollo 13 and during the Soviet negotiations had recommended him to Chris Kraft, who was by then director of Johnson Space Center. In 1973, Lunney became manager of the Apollo Spacecraft Program Office, a position which gave him responsibility for the Apollo spacecraft used during Skylab missions, as well giving him more authority in his role as head of the ASTP.

The ASTP mission took place in July 1975. It was criticized by some journalists as a "costly space circus", who felt that it wasted NASA funds that could have been better spent on projects such as Skylab. However, Lunney supported the project, saying in a later interview that he did not believe the cooperation necessary to build the International Space Station would have been possible if ASTP had not laid the groundwork for it.

=== Space Shuttle ===
After the ASTP mission was completed, Lunney became manager of the Shuttle Payload Integration and Development Program. During this period, it was anticipated that NASA's space shuttle fleet would be flying very frequent missions, and carrying commercial payloads as well as flying missions for government organizations such as the Department of Defense and the Jet Propulsion Laboratory. The payload integration program was responsible for determining how the various demands of these customers could be satisfied, and how mixed payloads could best be physically accommodated within the cargo bay of the shuttle. During these years Lunney also spent time working at NASA Headquarters in Washington, D.C., as Deputy Associate Administrator for Space Flight and later as Acting Associate Administrator for Space Transportation Operations.

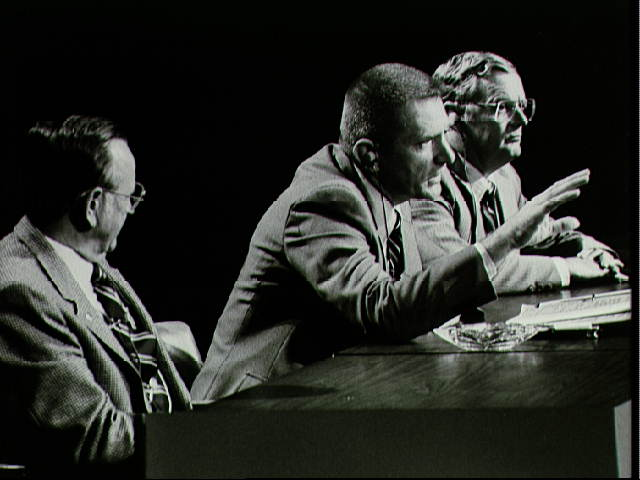
Glynn Lunney (far right) as manager of the Shuttle program, at a press conference with Chris Kraft and Gene Kranz in 1981

In 1981, Lunney became manager of the Space Shuttle program, a high-level position where Lunney found himself responsible for setting the agenda for the developing program. His responsibilities were broad ones; they included supervising program planning, budgeting and scheduling; systems engineering; and mission planning. During the earlier shuttle flights he was involved in determining whether the weather was suitable for launch, but in later years that responsibility was largely devolved to lower levels of the hierarchy.

Many of his colleagues had expected Lunney to succeed his mentor, Kraft, as director of Johnson Space Center; Neil Hutchinson, a fellow flight director, later commented that Lunney "was sort of the anointed one". However, when Kraft retired in 1982, former Apollo flight director Gerry Griffin was offered the position instead.

In 1985, Lunney decided to leave NASA, feeling that the Space Shuttle program had worn him out physically and mentally and that he was ready for a new type of challenge. Although he had retired from NASA the year before, he was called to testify before the U.S. House Committee on Science and Technology in the aftermath of the Challenger accident. While still manager of the shuttle program, he had signed the "Criticality 1" waiver that allowed Challenger to launch even though the joints of its solid rocket boosters had recently been redefined as non-redundant systems. His actions were not unusual in the context of NASA practice at the time, which allowed a "walk through" of such potentially controversial waivers if no debate was expected.

== Career at Rockwell ==
Upon leaving NASA in 1985, Lunney took a position at Rockwell International, the contractor responsible for the construction, operation, and maintenance of the Space Shuttle. At first he worked in California, managing a Rockwell division that was building satellites for the Global Positioning System; this was his first experience with satellites. In 1990, he returned to Houston as President of the Rockwell Space Operations Company, which provided support for flight operations at Johnson Space Center and employed about 3,000 people. For Lunney, this represented a return to his roots in mission operations, which he had left twenty years before.

In 1995, Rockwell joined forces with its competitor Lockheed Martin to form the United Space Alliance, a jointly owned organization created to provide operations support for NASA, as well as to take over some of the functions previously performed by NASA employees. At this point, Lunney became Vice President and Program Manager of the United Space Alliance's spaceflight operations in Houston; he stayed in this position until his retirement in 1999.

== Personal life ==
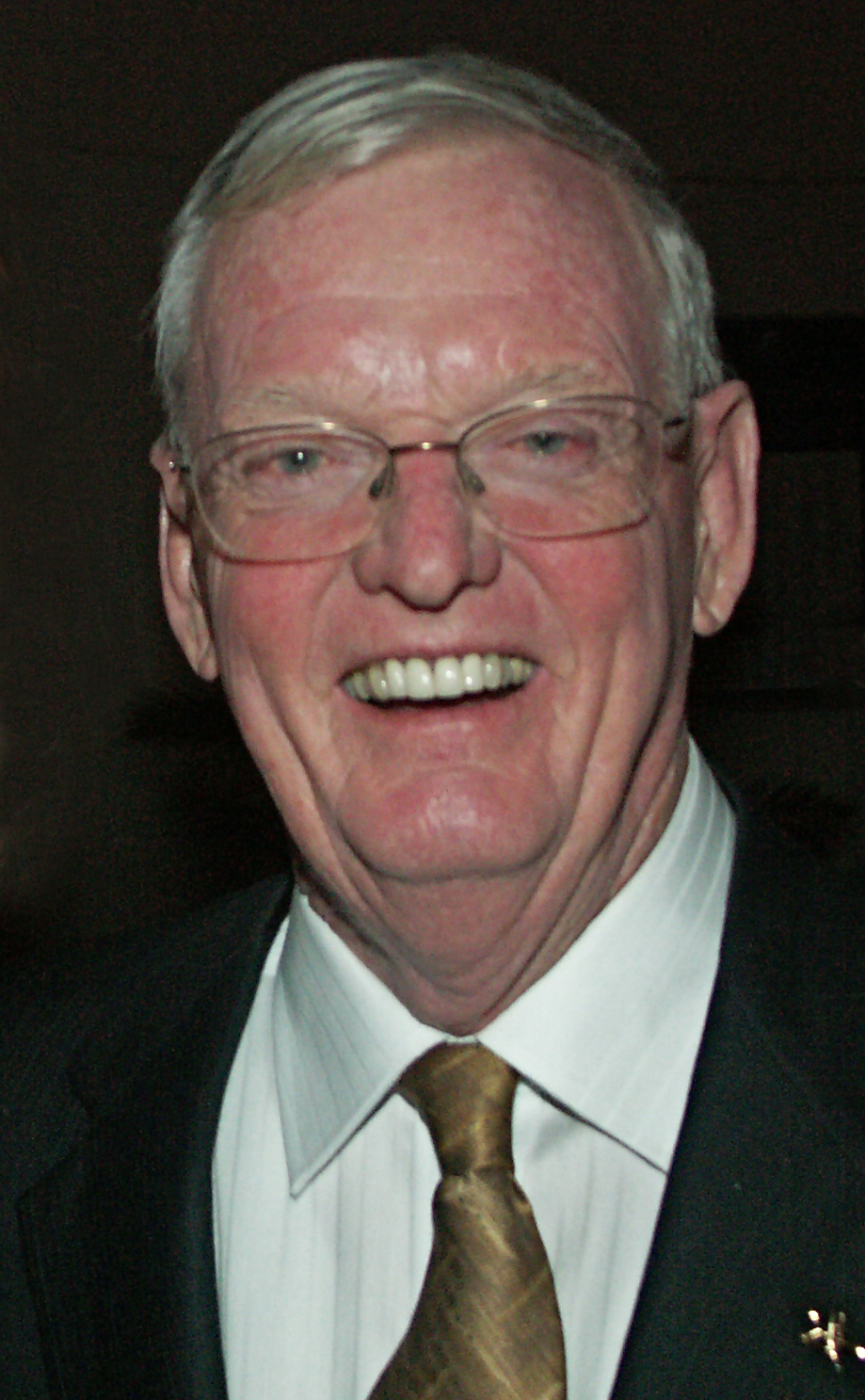
Lunney in December 2008

While at Lewis Research Center, Lunney met Marilyn Kurtz, who worked there as a nurse. They were married in 1960 and had four children: Jennifer, Glynn Jr., Shawn, and Bryan. Their youngest son Bryan also pursued a career at NASA, becoming a flight director in 2001 and retiring in 2011. Lunney and his son Bryan were the first multi-generational flight directors to have served NASA.

During his leisure hours, Lunney enjoyed sailing; during the 1960s the family owned a twenty-foot sailboat which they took out on Galveston Bay, and he occasionally dreamed of going with his wife and children on an ocean cruise lasting for months. In his retirement he enjoyed golf, saying that "I have come to realize that golf will not be mastered, but will continue to be humbling."

Described as "legendary" by NASA, Lunney died on March 19, 2021, at his home in Clear Lake, Texas, at the age of 84. He had been treated for leukemia for several years, but according to his family he succumbed to stomach cancer.

== Awards and honors ==
Lunney was a Fellow of the American Astronomical Society and of the American Institute of Aeronautics and Astronautics. In 1971, he was awarded an honorary Doctorate from the University of Scranton. He received many awards from NASA, including three Group Achievement Awards, two Exceptional Service Medals and three Distinguished Service Medals.

In 2005, he received the National Space Trophy from the Rotary National Award for Space Achievement Foundation. The award is given to individuals who have made an outstanding and career-spanning contribution to America's space program. Previous winners have included Chris Kraft and Neil Armstrong. "Lunney's innovation and dedication to the U.S. space flight program", said the RNASA Advisor General, "has set a standard for current and future generations of space explorers. As a manager, he inspired his employees to do their best work and offered direction and encouragement to his team when challenges arose; as an explorer, he always looked toward the future and saw the endless possibilities and benefits of man's journey into space."

In 2008 he received the Elmer A. Sperry Award, jointly with Thomas P. Stafford, Alexey Leonov and Konstantin Bushuyev, for their work on the Apollo–Soyuz mission and the Apollo–Soyuz docking interface design.

== In films ==
In the 1995 film Apollo 13, Glynn Lunney was portrayed by Marc McClure. McClure had a relatively minor role leading writer Charles Murray to lament that Lunney was "barely visible in the movie", being overshadowed by the focus on Lunney's fellow flight director Gene Kranz. "Without slighting Kranz's role", Murray commented, "the world should remember that it was Glynn Lunney ... who orchestrated a masterpiece of improvisation that moved the astronauts safely to the lunar module while sidestepping a dozen potential catastrophes that could have doomed them." "They didn't give me credit for any of the work that I did," Lunney said in 2019. "As a matter of fact, if you watch the movie, you'll see I'm sort of portrayed as a flunky."

In the 2020 television miniseries The Right Stuff, Lunney was played by Jackson Pace.

== Select publications ==
- Lunney, G. S. and K. C. Weston. (1959). "Heat-Transfer Measurements on an Air-Launched, Blunted Cone-Cylinder Rocket Vehicle to Mach 9.7". NASA-TM X-84. Cleveland, Ohio: NASA Lewis Research Center.
- Lunney, G. S., L. C. Dunseith, and J. F. Dalby. (1960). "Project Mercury: Methods and Pertinent Data for Project Mercury Flight Computing Requirements". NASA-TM-X-69335. Hampton, Virginia: NASA Langley Research Center.
- Lunney, G. S. (1964). "Launch-Phase Monitoring". In Manned Spacecraft: Engineering Design and Operation. Ed. Paul E. Purser, Maxime A. Faget, and Norman F. Smith. New York: Fairchild Publications, Inc.
- Lunney, G. S. (February 6–8, 1967). Summary of Gemini Rendezvous Experience (PDF). American Institute of Aeronautics and Astronautics Flight Test, Simulation and Support Conference. Cocoa Beach, Florida. AIAA paper 67-272.
- Lunney, G. S. (October 19–22, 1970). Discussion of Several Problem Areas During the Apollo 13 Operation (PDF). American Institute of Aeronautics and Astronautics 7th Annual Meeting and Technical Display. Houston. AIAA Paper 70-1260.

== Bibliography ==
- Atwater, James (January 11, 1969). "The Men Who Control Our Missions to the Moon". The Saturday Evening Post. pp. 34–36, 68, 70, 72.
- Chaikin, Andrew (2007). A Man on the Moon: The Voyages of the Apollo Astronauts. New York: Viking Penguin. ISBN 978-0-14-311235-8. OCLC 166227448.
- Ezell, Edward Clinton; Ezell, Linda Neuman (1978). "The Partnership: a History of the Apollo–Soyuz Test Project". The NASA History Series. NASA. OCLC 3705781. SP-4209. Archived from the original on January 17, 1999.
- Greene, Jay H. (November 10, 2004). "Oral History Transcript: Jay H. Greene" (PDF). NASA Johnson Space Center Oral History Project. Interviewed by Johnson, Sandra. Houston, Texas: Johnson Space Center.
- Hutchinson, Neil B. (January 21, 2004). "Oral History 3 Transcript: Neil B. Hutchinson" (PDF). NASA Johnson Space Center Oral History Project. Interviewed by Ross-Nazzal, Jennifer. Houston, Texas: Johnson Space Center.
- Kraft, Chris (2001). Flight: My Life in Mission Control. New York: Dutton. ISBN 0-525-94571-7. OCLC 44493448.
- Kranz, Gene (2000). Failure is Not an Option: Mission Control from Mercury to Apollo 13 and Beyond. New York: Simon & Schuster. ISBN 0-74320079-9. OCLC 1120567633.
- Lunney, G. S. (March 9, 1998). "Oral History 1 Transcript: Glynn S. Lunney" (PDF). NASA Johnson Space Center Oral History Project. Interviewed by Neal, Roy. Houston, Texas: Johnson Space Center.
- Lunney, G. S. (January 28, 1999a). "Oral History 2 Transcript: Glynn S. Lunney" (PDF). NASA Johnson Space Center Oral History Project. Interviewed by Butler, Carol. Houston, Texas: Johnson Space Center.
- Lunney, G. S. (February 8, 1999b). "Oral History 3 Transcript: Glynn S. Lunney" (PDF). NASA Johnson Space Center Oral History Project. Interviewed by Butler, Carol. Houston, Texas: Johnson Space Center.
- Lunney, G. S. (October 18, 1999c). "Oral History 7 Transcript: Glynn S. Lunney" (PDF). NASA Johnson Space Center Oral History Project. Interviewed by Butler, Carol. Houston, Texas: Johnson Space Center.
- Lunney, G. S. (December 9, 1999d). "Oral History 8 Transcript: Glynn S. Lunney" (PDF). NASA Johnson Space Center Oral History Project. Interviewed by Butler, Carol. Houston, Texas: Johnson Space Center.
- Lunney, G. S. (January 13, 2000a). "Oral History 9 Transcript: Glynn S. Lunney" (PDF). NASA Johnson Space Center Oral History Project. Interviewed by Butler, Carol. Houston, Texas: Johnson Space Center.
- Lunney, G. S. (March 9, 2000b). "Oral History 10 Transcript: Glynn S. Lunney" (PDF). NASA Johnson Space Center Oral History Project. Interviewed by Butler, Carol. Houston, Texas: Johnson Space Center.
- Mattingly, Thomas K. (November 6, 2001). "Oral History Transcript: Thomas K. Mattingly II" (PDF). NASA Johnson Space Center Oral History Project. Interviewed by Wright, Rebecca. Costa Mesa, California: Johnson Space Center.
- Murray, Charles; Cox, Catherine Bly (1989). Apollo: the Race to the Moon. New York: Simon and Schuster. ISBN 0-671-61101-1. OCLC 19589707.
- Swanson, Glen, ed. (1999). "Glynn S. Lunney". "Before This Decade is Out....": Personal Reflections on the Apollo Program. Washington, DC: NASA. ISBN 978-0-16-050139-5. OCLC 507180728. SP-4223.
- Vaughan, Diane (1996). The Challenger Launch Decision: Risky Technology, Culture and Deviance at NASA. Chicago, Illinois: University of Chicago Press. ISBN 978-0-226-85175-4. OCLC 33166669.
