= Allan D. Emil Memorial Award =

International Astronautical Federation award

The Allan D. Emil Memorial Award is presented every year at the Congress of the International Astronautical Federation.

It has been presented annually, since 1977, for an outstanding contribution in space science, space technology, space medicine, or space law which involved the participation of more than one nation and/or which furthered the possibility of greater international cooperation in astronautics.

The award consists of a certificate citation and a stipend donated by the Emil family.

== Recipients ==
- 1977: Charles Stark Draper
- 1978: Konstantin Bushuyev, Glynn Lunney
- 1979: Santiago Astrain
- 1980: Thomas P. Stafford
- 1981: Peter Jankowitsch, Leonid I. Sedov
- 1982: Roger Chevalier
- 1983: Roy Gibson
- 1984: Luboš Perek
- 1985: Hans E.W. Hoffmann
- 1986: Robert Freitag
- 1987: Ruedeger Reinhard, Burton Edelson, Roger-Maurice Bonnet, Roald Sagdeev, Minoru Oda
- 1988: Vladimír Kopal
- 1989: Johannes Geiss
- 1990: Oleg Gazenko, Arnauld Nicogossian, Karl Klein
- 1991: Guy Severin, Yuri P. Semenov
- 1992: George Müller, U. Ram Rao
- 1993: Hubert Curien
- 1994: Shigebumi (Saturo?) Saito
- 1995: Karl H. Doetsch
- 1996: Anatoly Grigoriev
- 1997: James Harford
- 1998: Alvaro Azcarraga
- 1999: Edward C. Stone
- 2000: Marcio Barbosa
- 2001: Richard Kline
- 2002: Jean-Claude Husson
- 2003: Liu Jiyuan
- 2004: Krishnaswamy Kasturirangan
- 2005: Ernesto Vallerani
- 2006: Oleg Alifanov
- 2007: Gerhard Haerendel
- 2008: Conrad Lautenbacher
- 2009: Wei Sun
- 2010: Nikolay A. Anfimov
- 2011: Kuniaki Shiraki
- 2012: Kuninori Uesugi
- 2013: Ma Xingrui
- 2014: K. Radhakrishnan
- 2015: Virendra Jha
- 2016: Charles Elachi
- 2017: Lei Fanpei
- 2018: Xia Guohong
- 2019: Joan Vernikos
- 2020: Kailasavadivoo Sivan

== See also ==
- List of space technology awards
