= Bryan Lunney =

American aerospace engineer

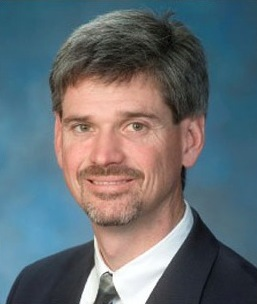
Bryan Lunney as flight director on STS-115

Bryan Lunney (born January 12, 1966) is an American aerospace engineer and former NASA flight director.

== Early life ==
The son of Apollo-era flight director Glynn Lunney (1936–2021), Bryan Lunney grew up in Friendswood, Texas, and attended Friendswood High School. He graduated from Texas A&M University in 1988 with a Bachelor of Science degree in Aerospace Engineering.

== NASA career ==
After graduation, Lunney took a job at NASA's Johnson Space Center. He worked in Mission Control as a Propulsion Engineer before moving to become head of the Motion Control Systems Group, a flight control position associated with the International Space Station. At the time of his father's death in 2021, they were the first and only multi-generational flight directors to have served NASA.

In January, 2001, Lunney was appointed a flight director. He was on duty during the Expedition 4 mission when the International Space Station's computers failed, leaving the station's gyroscopes without the information they needed in order to hold the station's attitude stable. Lunney led controllers in creating a primitive but effective temporary solution to the problem, having the crew control the attitude of the space station based on their observations of the Sun's position. He said later that “I felt like a fireman who’d walked out of a burning house having just rescued the kids from the bedroom.”

Lunney also worked as a flight director on Expedition 11, and as the Planning/Orbit 3 flight director on the STS-115 mission in September 2006.

== Personal life ==
Lunney and his wife, the former Amori Syptak, have three children.
