= Burton Edelson =

US Navy officer (1926-2002)

Burton I. Edelson
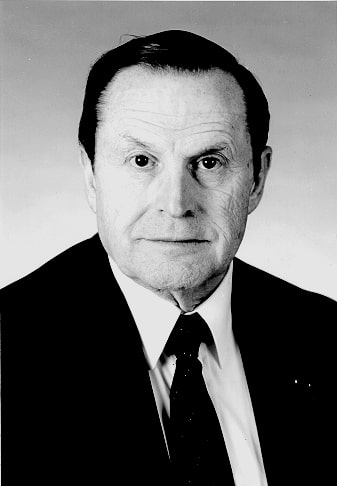
- Born: July 31, 1926; New York, New York, US
- Died: January 6, 2002 (aged 75); New York, New York, US
- Education: United States Naval Academy; Yale University
- Spouse: Betty Good Edelson
- Children: 3 sons
- Awards: Navy Legion of Merit (1965); Wilbur Cross Medal (1984); Allan D. Emil Memorial Award (1987); NASA Exceptional Service Medal (1987); Arthur C. Clarke Award (2015)

Burton I. Edelson (July 31, 1926 – January 6, 2002) was, for 20 years, a United States Navy Officer involved in advanced research and space science, a leader in developing satellite communications at COMSAT, and a leader of NASA's Space Science and Applications during the 1980s. His publications are held in libraries worldwide.

He was a driving force in supporting the Hubble Space Telescope, the Halley's Comet Intercept, and in international technical collaboration.

== Early years ==
Edelson was born July 31, 1926, in New York City to Samuel Edelson and Margaret Raff Edelson. He had a younger brother, Kenneth Joseph Edelson. Because of the Depression, the family moved in 1931 to East Lansing, Michigan. Samuel Edelson had bought the store out of bankruptcy from Fields, his former employer. Burton Edelson graduated in 1944 from East Lansing High School and received an appointment to the United States Naval Academy. He graduated in June 1947 as part of the USNA Class of 1948A. (Note: Apparently, during WWII, the education was accelerated to three years, but as the war ended, they split the class, with some students finishing in three years, others taking the full four year program.)

== Navy years ==
After graduation, Edelson spent four years in the Pacific Fleet. He served on destroyers and minesweepers in San Diego, Pearl Harbor, San Francisco, and Shanghai. In 1951, Edelson attended the Naval Postgraduate School first in Annapolis and then in Monterey, California. He continued his studies via the Office of Naval Research at Yale University, off and on. He received a PhD in Metallurgy in 1960. He served in Norfolk, Virginia, from 1954 to 1955 and in the Cleveland, Ohio ship building yards from 1955 to 1959. After moving to Washington, D.C., in 1959, he was assigned to the White House Space Council as a Navy Liaison. In 1965, he moved to the London Office of Naval Research where his responsibilities focused on technology exchange as part of NATO. He specialized in advanced communications.

== Communications satellite research and development years ==
Dr. Edelson retired as a Commander in 1968 and worked at Comsat from 1969 to 1982. He was hired as the Assistant Director to Bill Pritchard for Comsat Labs that were opened in 1969. In 1973, he became the director of Comsat Labs where he directed advanced research in digital communications, satellite communications, compression technologies, maritime communications, teleports.

Dr. Edelson was a cofounder in 1971 of Digital Communications Corporation (DCC) with John Puente, Andy Werth, Gene Gabbard, and four others. The eight founders each contributed $5,000. As digital communications and technology company founders, they were ahead of their time and had trouble securing financial support. Eventually, Dr. Tadahiro Sekimoto of NEC agreed to invest one million dollars in DCC. DCC later merged with Microwave Associates, becoming MA/COM MACOM Technology Solutions which was listed on the New York Stock Exchange. DCC was eventually sold and became Hughes Communications.

== NASA space science and applications years ==
In 1982, Dr. Burton Edelson was appointed by President Reagan as Associate Administrator for Space, Science, and Applications. At NASA, he championed international cooperation, advanced scientific research, and unmanned spaceflight. He played a leading role in the Mars exploration missions and the Hubble Space Telescope, and was associated with other programs such as the Advanced Communications Technology Satellite (ACTS), the Cosmic Background Explorer satellite program, the Halley's Comet Intercept, as well as Mission to Planet Earth, Search for Extraterrestrial Life, and Outer Planet Research. "When he came to NASA, the space science budget was at a low," said Neil Helm, deputy director of George Washington University's Institute for Applied Space Research, which Edelson founded after retiring from NASA in 1987. "But he managed to increase the budget significantly, and established a number of programs that helped reinvigorate space science at NASA." "There had been some talk about the Hubble telescope project at NASA before he got there, but he was the one that really got it going." AT NASA, Edelson pursued the research related to the hole in the ozone layer in the 1980s which resulted in the banning of certain chemicals in aerosols.

Educational Achievements: After the Founder's conference for the International Space University held at M.I.T. in April 1987, Dr. Edelson played a critical role in getting seed grants both from NASA and the European Space Agency that allowed the formal creation of the International Space University in 1988. Since the holding of this first session of the International Space University at M.I.T. in summer of 1988, the I.S.U. has graduated many thousands of students from over 100 nations around the world in its space studies program and Masters of Space Studies degree program and created its permanent global campus in Strasbourg, France.

After retiring from NASA, Edelson directed research and development projects in satellite communications at George Washington University until his death in 2002.

== Publications ==
Edelson wrote more than 75 scholarly articles in technical publications including articles for Science and Scientific American on the subject of advanced satellite communications. His papers are archived at Johns Hopkins Libraries.

== Recognition and awards ==
Edelson received the following awards:

- the Navy Legion of Merit in 1965
- Yale's Wilbur Cross Medal in 1984
- The NASA Exceptional Service Medal in 1987
- The Allan D. Emil Memorial Award by the International Astronautical Federation in 1987.
- The Sir Arthur Clarke Award for International Achievement from the British Interplanetary Society in 2015.
- Inducted into the Space and Satellite Hall of Fame in 1997.
- The Burton and Betty Edelson Scholarship was established in 2002 to support needy students in the George Washington School of Engineering and Applied Science.
- The International Academy of Astronautics Engineering Science Award in 2001 .

== Family and personal life ==
Burton Edelson was married for 49 years to Betty Good Edelson, 4/17/1931-12/31/2014, of Havre de Grace, Maryland. He had three sons: Stephen Edelson, John Edelson, and Daniel Edelson. He was a lifelong player of the clarinet and saxophone as well as tennis.Burton and Betty are buried together in Arlington National Cemetery.
