= John Hodge (engineer) =

British-born aerospace engineer (1929–2021)

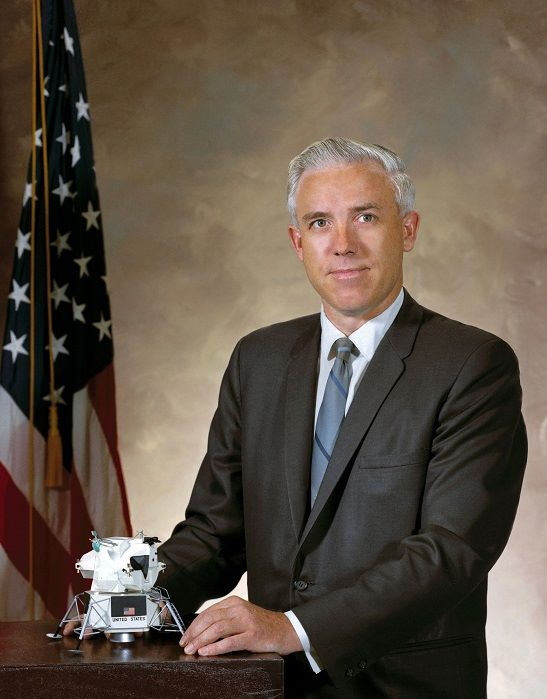
- Hodge in 1969
- Born: John Dennis Hodge; 10 February 1929; Leigh-on-Sea, Essex, England
- Died: 19 May 2021 (aged 92); Herndon, Virginia, US
- Education: Northampton Engineering College; University of London
- Scientific career
- Workplaces: NASA

John Dennis Hodge (10 February 1929 – 19 May 2021) was a British aerospace engineer. He worked for the CF-105 Avro Arrow jet interceptor project in Canada. When it was cancelled in 1959, he became a member of NASA's Space Task Group, which later became the Johnson Space Center. During his NASA career, he worked as a flight director and planner. As the on-shift flight director of the Gemini 8 spaceflight crewed by Neil Armstrong and Dave Scott as it entered a spin, Hodge was credited with the safe landing of these astronauts.

When he returned to NASA in the 1980s, he worked as a manager on the Space Station Freedom project, which later became the International Space Station. He also served as an administrator at the United States Department of Transportation.

== Early life ==
Hodge was born in Leigh-on-Sea, Essex, in 1929, and attended Minchenden Grammar School in Southgate, London. He studied at the Northampton Engineering College at the University of London, graduating in 1949 with a first-class degree in engineering. From 1950 through 1952 he worked as an engineer at Vickers-Armstrongs in Weybridge, beginning upon graduation in the Aerodynamics Department. In 1952 Hodge took a job at the Avro Arrow project in Canada, where he was head of the air loads section.

== NASA career ==
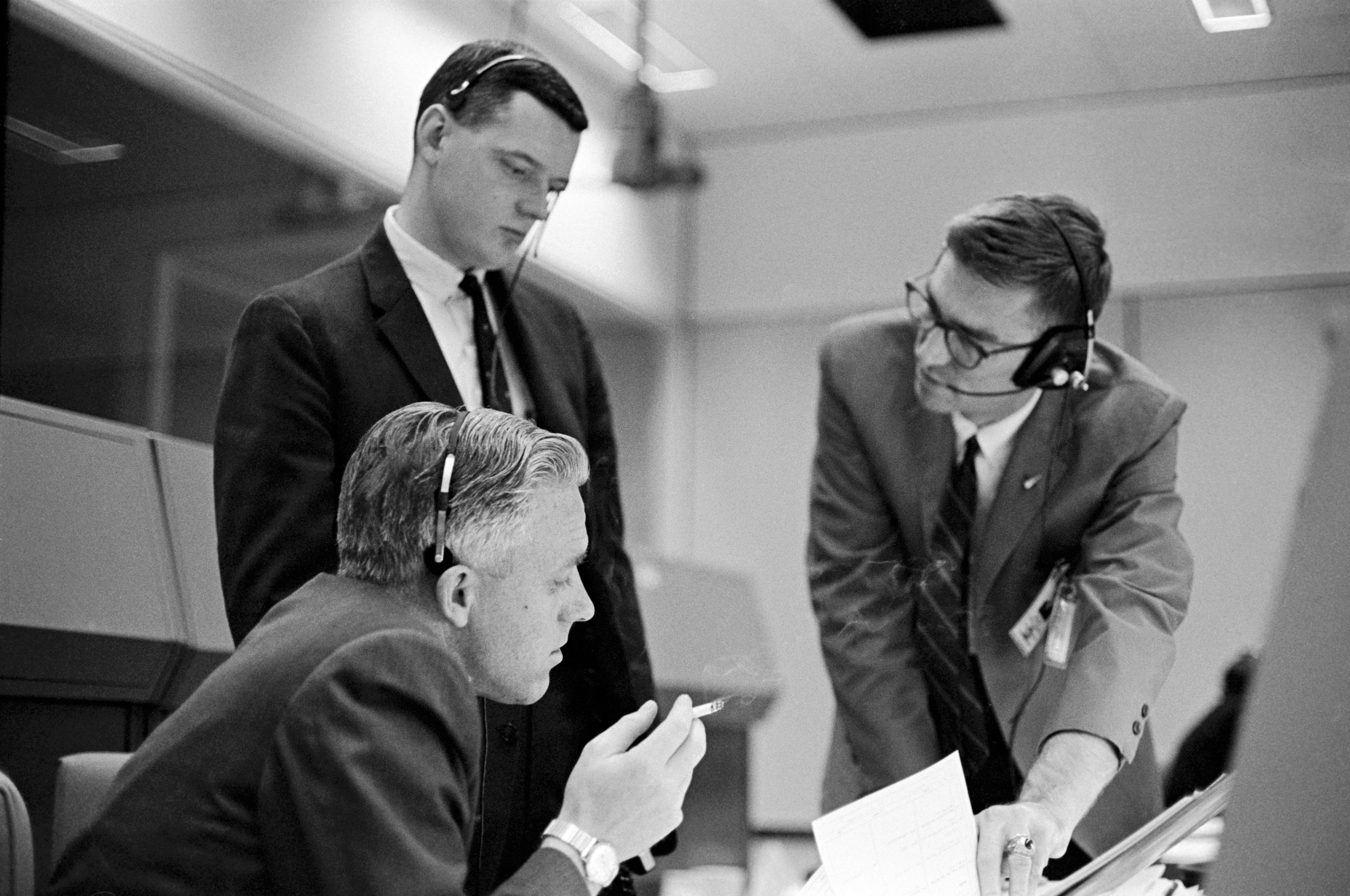
John Hodge (bottom left) with Glynn Lunney and James Beach during Gemini 3

When the Avro Arrow project was cancelled in 1959, 32 Avro engineers including Hodge followed the lead of Jim Chamberlin and migrated to join NASA's Space Task Group. The group, based at Langley Research Center in Hampton, Virginia, was responsible for America's crewed space program, Project Mercury. At Langley, Hodge became the assistant to Chris Kraft, who was the head of the Space Task Group's operations division and NASA's first flight director.

During John Glenn's historic 1962 Friendship 7 mission, the first orbital flight by an American, Hodge was serving as the flight director at NASA's tracking station in Bermuda.

The final flight in the Mercury program, MA-9, was scheduled to last long enough that a second flight director was needed in Mission Control. Thus, in 1963, Hodge became a flight director, choosing blue as his team color. The missions that he worked on included Gemini 8, where he was the first person other than Kraft to be lead flight director for a mission. Hodge was on shift when a stuck Gemini thruster brought a rapid end to the mission. He was also on duty during the launch test that resulted in the Apollo 1 fire which killed Virgil Grissom, Edward White and Roger Chaffee.

Hodge was the on-shift flight director of the Gemini VIII spaceflight, crewed by Neil Armstrong and Dave Scott, as it suffered an in-flight failure causing it to roll out of control. Hodge said the role of flight control was then to "tell them what we wanted to do, and feed all their retro information, when they should fire rockets, what angle they should be at, what time, all that kind of stuff", directing the falling spacecraft to be near the Navy destroyer USS Leonard F. Mason, "and he landed close, fairly close to the destroyer, and they picked him up"; Hodge later said "if anybody ever says what did I do in the space program, it was make sure that Neil Armstrong was around to fly on Apollo".

Hodge retired as a flight director in 1968, and became head of Johnson Space Center's advanced program office where he worked on preparing for the last three Apollo lunar landings and programs to follow Apollo. He left NASA in 1970 but returned in 1982 to run a large space station design study. When Space Station Freedom began in 1984, Hodge was named NASA's Associate Administrator for Space Station, a post he held until leaving NASA in 1987.

== Career outside NASA ==
After leaving NASA in 1970, Hodge worked for the Transport Systems Center, Cambridge, Massachusetts, and the Urban Transportation Development Corporation in Toronto, Ontario, Canada, before serving five years as an administrator at the United States Department of Transportation. He rejoined NASA in 1982 and served in a variety of administrator positions before leaving again in 1986. Hodge then formed his own firm, J. D. Hodge and Company, which was an international management and aerospace consulting company.

== Death ==
Hodge died at his home in Herndon, Virginia, at the age of 92 on 19 May 2021.

== In film ==
Hodge was portrayed by Jim Piddock in the 1998 miniseries From the Earth to the Moon, and by Ben Owen in the 2018 film First Man.
