= Christopher C. Kraft Jr. =

American aerospace engineer (1924–2019)

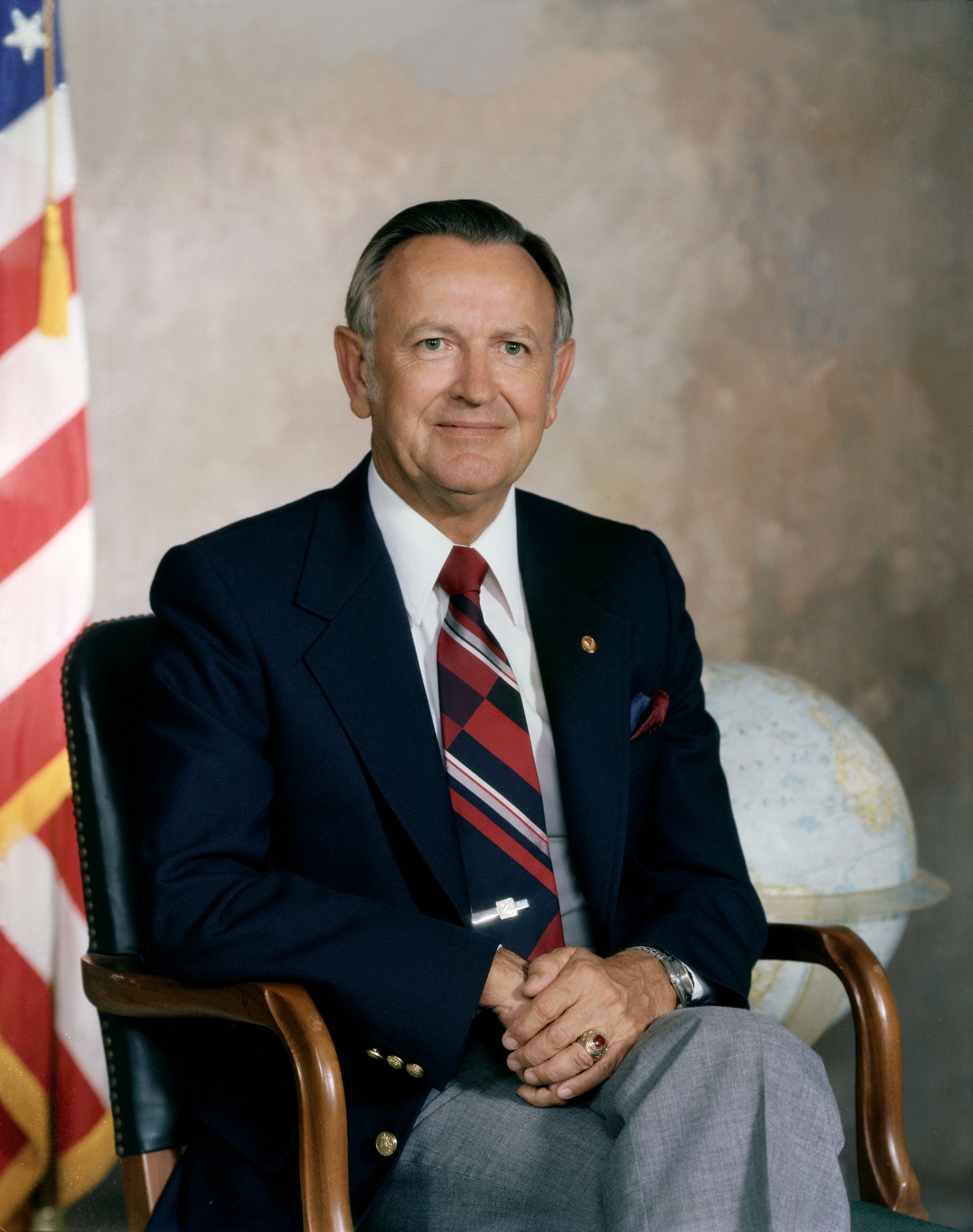
- Kraft as director of Johnson Space Center in 1979
- Born: Christopher Columbus Kraft Jr. February 28, 1924; Phoebus, Virginia, U.S.
- Died: July 22, 2019 (aged 95); Houston, Texas, U.S.
- Education: Virginia Tech (BS)
- Occupations: NASA flight director Director of Johnson Space Center
- Spouse: Betty Anne Kraft (m. 1950)
- Children: 2
- Awards: NASA Outstanding Leadership Medal (1963); NASA Distinguished Service Medal (1969, 1969, 1981, 1982); ASME Medal (1973); Roger W. Jones Award for Executive Leadership (1979)

Signature
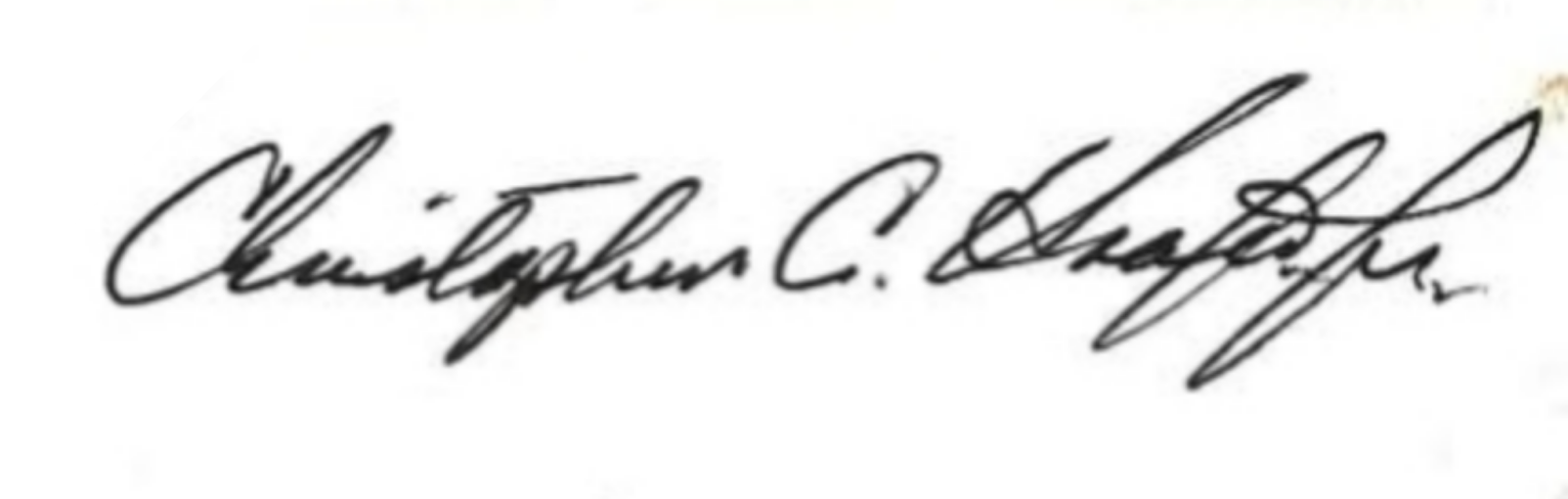

Christopher Columbus Kraft Jr. (February 28, 1924 – July 22, 2019) was an American aerospace and NASA engineer who was instrumental in establishing the agency's mission control center and shaping its organization and culture. His protégé Glynn Lunney said in 1998: "the Control Center today ... is a reflection of Chris Kraft".

Following his 1944 graduation from Virginia Polytechnic Institute and State University with a Bachelor of Science degree in aeronautical engineering, Kraft was hired by the National Advisory Committee for Aeronautics (NACA), the predecessor organization to the National Aeronautics and Space Administration (NASA). He worked for over a decade in aeronautical research and in 1958 joined the Space Task Group, a small team entrusted with the responsibility of putting America's first man in space. Assigned to the flight operations division, Kraft became NASA's first flight director. He was on duty during America's first crewed spaceflight, first crewed orbital flight, and first spacewalk. At the beginning of the Apollo program, Kraft retired as a flight director to concentrate on management and mission planning. In 1972, he became director of the Manned Spacecraft Center (later Johnson Space Center), following his mentor Robert R. Gilruth, and held the position until his retirement in 1982.

Later, Kraft consulted for companies such as IBM and Rockwell International. In 1994, he was appointed chairman of a panel to make NASA's Space Shuttle program more cost effective. The panel's controversial report, known as the Kraft report, recommended that NASA's Space Shuttle operations should be outsourced to a private contractor. It also recommended that NASA cut back on the organizational changes intended to improve safety that were made after the Space Shuttle Challenger disaster. This attracted even more critical comment after the Space Shuttle Columbia disaster.

Kraft published his autobiography Flight: My Life in Mission Control in 2001. The Mission Control Center building was named after him in 2011. When he received the National Space Trophy from the Rotary Club in 1999, the organization described him as "a driving force in the U.S. human space flight program from its beginnings to the Space Shuttle era, a man whose accomplishments have become legendary".

== Early life and education ==
Christopher Columbus Kraft Jr. was born in Phoebus, Virginia, on February 28, 1924. He was named after his father, Christopher Columbus Kraft, who was born in New York City in 1892 near the newly renamed Columbus Circle. Kraft's father, the son of Bavarian immigrants, had found his name an embarrassment, but passed it along to his son nonetheless. In later years, Kraft—as well as other commentators—would consider it peculiarly appropriate. Kraft commented in his autobiography that, with the choice of his name, "some of my life's direction was settled from the start". His mother, Vanda Olivia (née Suddreth), was a nurse. As a boy, Kraft played in an American Legion drum-and-bugle corps and became the state champion bugler. He went to school in Phoebus, where the only school went to the ninth grade and attended Hampton High School. He was a keen baseball player and continued to play the sport in college; one year he had a batting average of .340.

In September 1941, Kraft began his studies at Virginia Polytechnic Institute and State University (Virginia Tech) and became a Cadet in the Corps of Cadets as a member of N-Squadron. The United States entered World War II in December 1941, and he attempted to enlist in the United States Navy as a V-12 aviation cadet, but was rejected because of a burned right hand that he had suffered at age three. He graduated in December 1944 with a Bachelor of Science degree in aeronautical engineering.

== NACA career ==
On graduation, Kraft accepted a job with the Chance Vought aircraft company in Bridgeport, Connecticut. He had also applied to the National Advisory Committee for Aeronautics (NACA), a government agency whose Langley Research Center was in Hampton, Virginia; Kraft considered it to be too close to home, but applied as a back-up if he was not accepted elsewhere. On arrival to begin work at Chance Vought he was told during three successive attempts that he could not enter the plant without his birth certificate, which he had not brought with him and which he then attempted to procure. Annoyed by the repeated obstructive mindset of the clerk at the front gate, he decided to accept the offer from NACA instead.

In the 1940s, NACA was a research and development organization, devoted to cutting-edge aeronautical research. At the Langley Research Center, advanced wind tunnels were used to test new aircraft designs, and studies were taking place on new concepts such as the Bell X-1 rocket plane. Kraft was assigned to the flight research division, where Robert R. Gilruth was then chief of research. His work with NACA included the development of an early example of gust alleviation systems for aircraft flying in turbulent air. This involved compensating for variations in the atmosphere by automatically deflecting the control surfaces. He investigated wingtip vortices, and discovered that they, and not prop-wash, are responsible for most of the wake turbulence in the air that trails flying aircraft.

Although he enjoyed his work, Kraft found it increasingly stressful, especially since he did not consider himself to be a strong theoretician. In 1956, he was diagnosed with an ulcer and started thinking about a change of career.

== Flight director ==
=== Flight operations ===
In 1957, the Soviet flight of Sputnik 1 prompted the United States to accelerate its fledgling space program. On July 29, 1958, President Dwight D. Eisenhower signed the National Aeronautics and Space Act, which established NASA and subsumed NACA within this newly created organization. Langley Research Center became a part of NASA, as did Langley employees such as Kraft. Even before NASA began its official existence in October, Kraft was invited by Gilruth to become a part of a new group that was working on the problems of putting a man into orbit. Without much hesitation, he accepted the offer. When the Space Task Group was officially formed on November 5, Kraft became one of the original 33 personnel (25 of them engineers) to be assigned. This marked the beginning of America's man-in-space program, which came to be called Project Mercury.

As a member of the Space Task Group, Kraft was assigned to the flight operations division, which made plans and arrangements for the operation of the Mercury spacecraft during flight and for the control and monitoring of missions from the ground. Kraft became the assistant to Chuck Mathews, the head of the division, and was given the responsibility of putting together a mission plan. Given Mathews' casual analysis of the problem, it almost sounded simple:

"Chris, you come up with a basic mission plan. You know, the bottom-line stuff on how we fly a man from a launch pad into space and back again. It would be good if you kept him alive."

When Kraft began to plan NASA's flight operations, no human being had yet flown in space. In fact, the task before him was vast, requiring attention to flight plans, timelines, procedures, mission rules, spacecraft tracking, telemetry, ground support, telecommunications networks and contingency management.

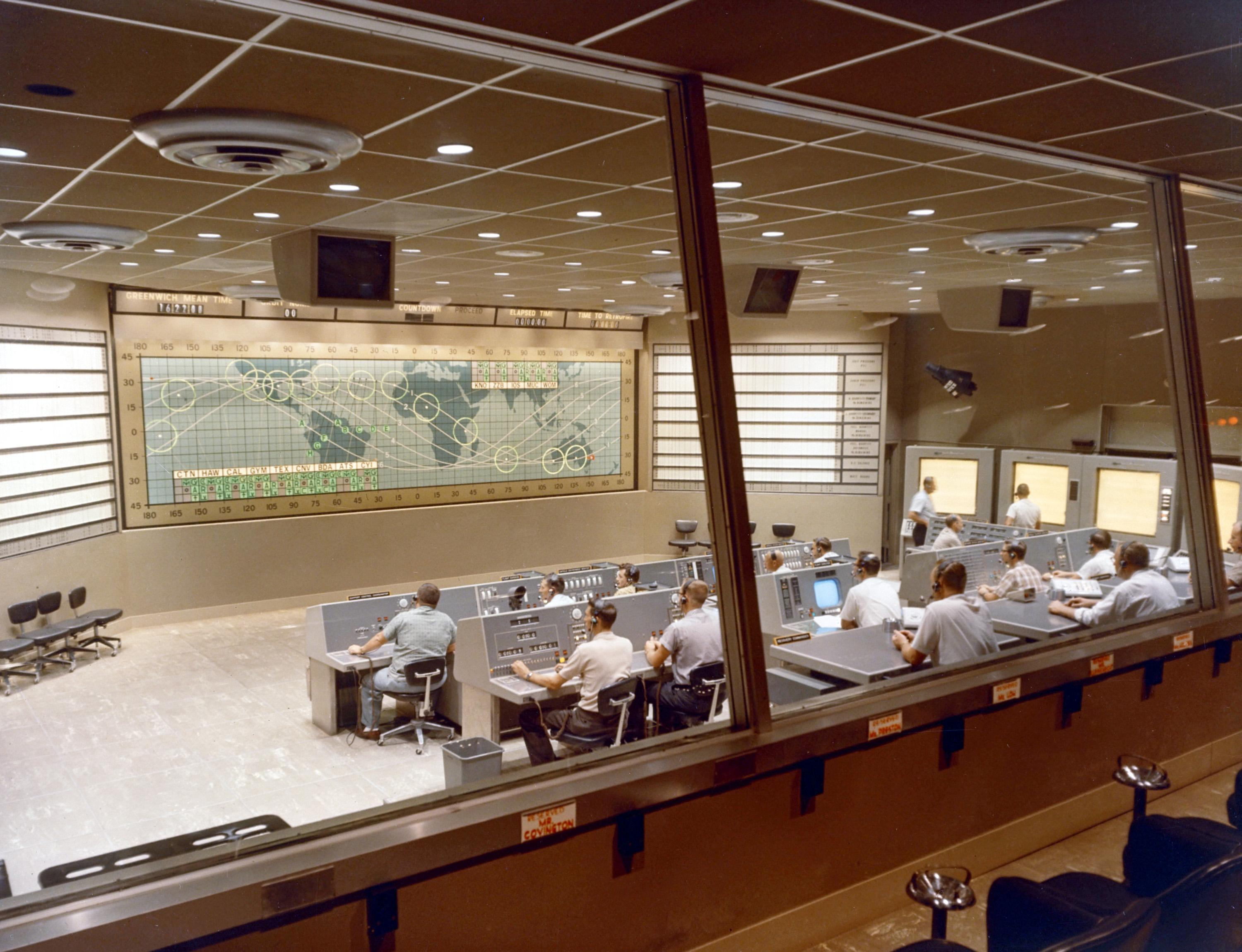
Mission Control Center as it was during Project Mercury

One of Kraft's most important contributions to crewed spaceflight would be his origination of the concept of a mission control center. Many of the engineers in Project Mercury had previously worked on the flight test of aircraft, where the role for ground support was minimal. Kraft soon realized that an astronaut could only do so much, particularly during the fast-moving launch phase; the Mercury spacecraft would require real time monitoring and support from specialist engineers.

"I saw a team of highly skilled engineers, each one an expert on a different piece of the Mercury capsule. We'd have a flow of accurate telemetry data so the experts could monitor their systems, see and even predict problems, and pass along instructions to the astronaut."

These concepts shaped the Mercury Control Center, which was at Cape Canaveral in Florida. Another important concept pioneered by Kraft was the idea of the flight director, the man who would coordinate the team of engineers and make real-time decisions about the conduct of the mission. As Mathews later recalled, Kraft came to him one day saying, "There needs to be someone in charge of the flights while they're actually going on, and I want to be that person." In this informal way, the position of flight director was created.

A pivotal experience for Kraft was the flight of Mercury-Atlas 5, which sent a chimpanzee named Enos on the first American orbital spaceflight carrying a live passenger. Coverage of these early missions that carried non-human passengers could often be tongue-in-cheek; a Time magazine article on the flight, for example, was titled "Meditative Chimponaut". Yet Kraft viewed them as important tests for the men and procedures of Mission Control, and as rehearsals for the crewed missions that would follow. Originally, the flight of Mercury-Atlas 5 had been intended to last for three orbits. The failure of one of the hydrogen peroxide jets controlling the spacecraft's attitude forced Kraft to make the decision to bring the capsule back to Earth after two orbits. After the flight, astronaut John Glenn stated that he believed a human passenger would have been able to bring the capsule under control without the need for an early re-entry, thus (in the words of Time) "affirming the superiority of astronauts over chimponauts." Yet for Kraft, the flight of Enos represented proof of the importance of real-time decision-making in Mission Control. It gave him a sense of the responsibility he would have for the lives of others, whether human or chimpanzee.

=== Mercury ===
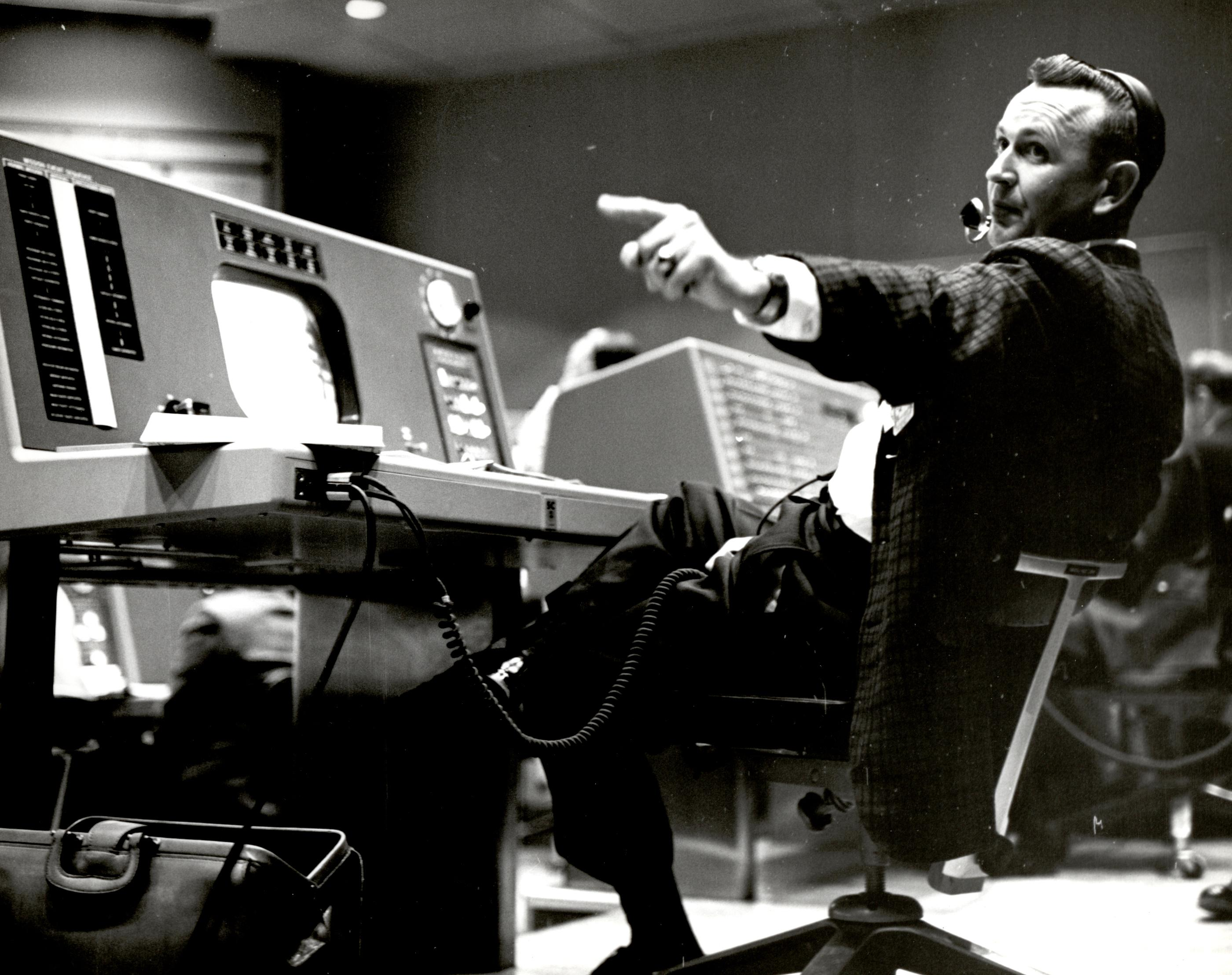
Kraft works at his console inside the Flight Control area of the Mercury Control Center.

Kraft served as flight director during all six of the crewed Mercury missions. During the final flight—Mercury-Atlas 9, which lasted for over a day—he shared responsibility with his deputy John Hodge.

Mercury-Atlas 6, the February 20, 1962, flight of John Glenn, was a testing experience both for Mission Control and for Kraft. Space historians Charles Murray and Catherine Bly Cox described it as "the single event that decisively shaped Flight Operations". The mission was the first orbital flight by an American, and unfolded normally until Glenn began his second orbit. At that point Kraft's systems controller, Don Arabian, reported that telemetry was showing a "Segment 51" indicator. This suggested that the capsule's landing bag, which was meant to deploy upon splashdown in order to provide a cushion, might have deployed early. Kraft believed that the Segment 51 indicator was due to faulty instrumentation rather than to an actual early deployment. If he was wrong, it would mean that the capsule's heat shield, which fitted on top of the landing bag, was now loose. A loose heat shield could cause the capsule to burn up during re-entry.

On consulting with his flight controllers, Kraft became convinced that the indication was false, and that no action was needed. His superiors, including Mercury capsule designer Max Faget, overruled Kraft, telling him to instruct Glenn to leave the capsule's retrorocket package on during re-entry. The reasoning was that the package, which was strapped over the heat shield, would hold the heat shield in place if it was loose. Kraft, however, felt that this was an unacceptable risk. "I was aghast," he remembered. "If any of three retrorockets had solid fuel remaining, an explosion could rip everything apart." Yet he agreed to follow the plan advocated by Faget and by Walt Williams, his superior in the flight operations division. The retrorockets would be kept on.

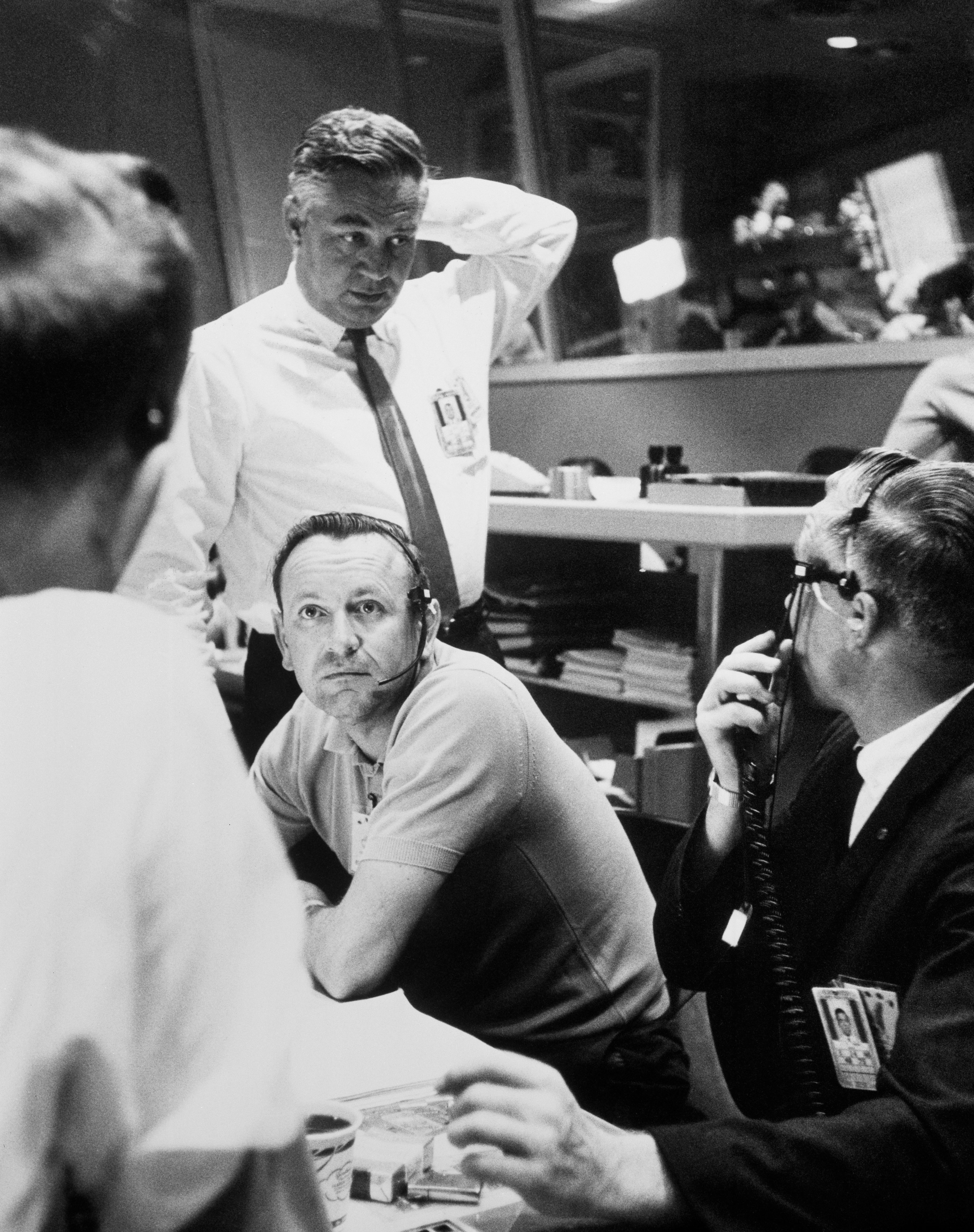
Chris Kraft (seated) confers with Walt Williams and others during Mercury-Atlas 9.

Glenn landed safely, but an inspection of his capsule revealed that one of the landing bag switches had been faulty. Kraft was right; the heat shield had not been loose after all. The lessons that he drew from this experience were clear.

"My flight controllers and I were a lot closer to the systems and to events than anyone in top management. From now on, I swore, they'd pay hell before they overruled any decision I made."

His assistant on the mission, Gene Kranz, considered Glenn's flight "the turning point ... in Kraft's evolution as a flight director."

Before the flight of Mercury-Atlas 7, Kraft had objected to the choice of Scott Carpenter as the astronaut for the mission, telling Walt Williams that Carpenter's lack of engineering skills might put the mission or his own life in danger. The mission suffered from problems including an unusually high rate of fuel usage, a malfunctioning horizon indicator, a delayed retrofire for re-entry, and a splashdown that was 250 nmi (460 km) downrange from the target area. Throughout the mission, Kraft found himself frustrated by the vagueness of Carpenter's communications with Mission Control, and what he perceived as Carpenter's inattention to his duties. "Part of the problem," he recalled, "was that Carpenter either didn't understand or was ignoring my instructions."

While some of these problems were due to mechanical failures, and responsibility for some of the others is still being debated, Kraft did not hesitate to assign blame to Carpenter, and continued to speak out about the mission for decades afterwards. His autobiography, written in 2001, reopened the issue; the chapter that dealt with the flight of Mercury-Atlas 7 was titled "The Man Malfunctioned". In a letter to The New York Times, Carpenter called the book "vindictive and skewed", and offered a different assessment of the reasons for Kraft's frustration: "in space things happen so fast that only the pilot knows what to do, and even ground control can't help. Maybe that's why he is still fuming after all these years."

=== Gemini ===
During the Gemini program, Kraft's role changed again. He was now the head of mission operations, in charge of a team of flight directors, although still also serving as a flight director. Due to the greater length of Gemini missions, Mission Control was now manned on a three-shift basis. "Clearly, with flight control facing a learning curve," space historian David Harland has said, "these arrangements were an experiment in their own right." Yet, Kraft proved to be remarkably successful at passing on responsibility to his fellow flight directors—arguably too successful, as Gene Kranz found during his first shift handover on Gemini 4. As Kranz recalled, "He just said, 'You're in charge,' and walked out."

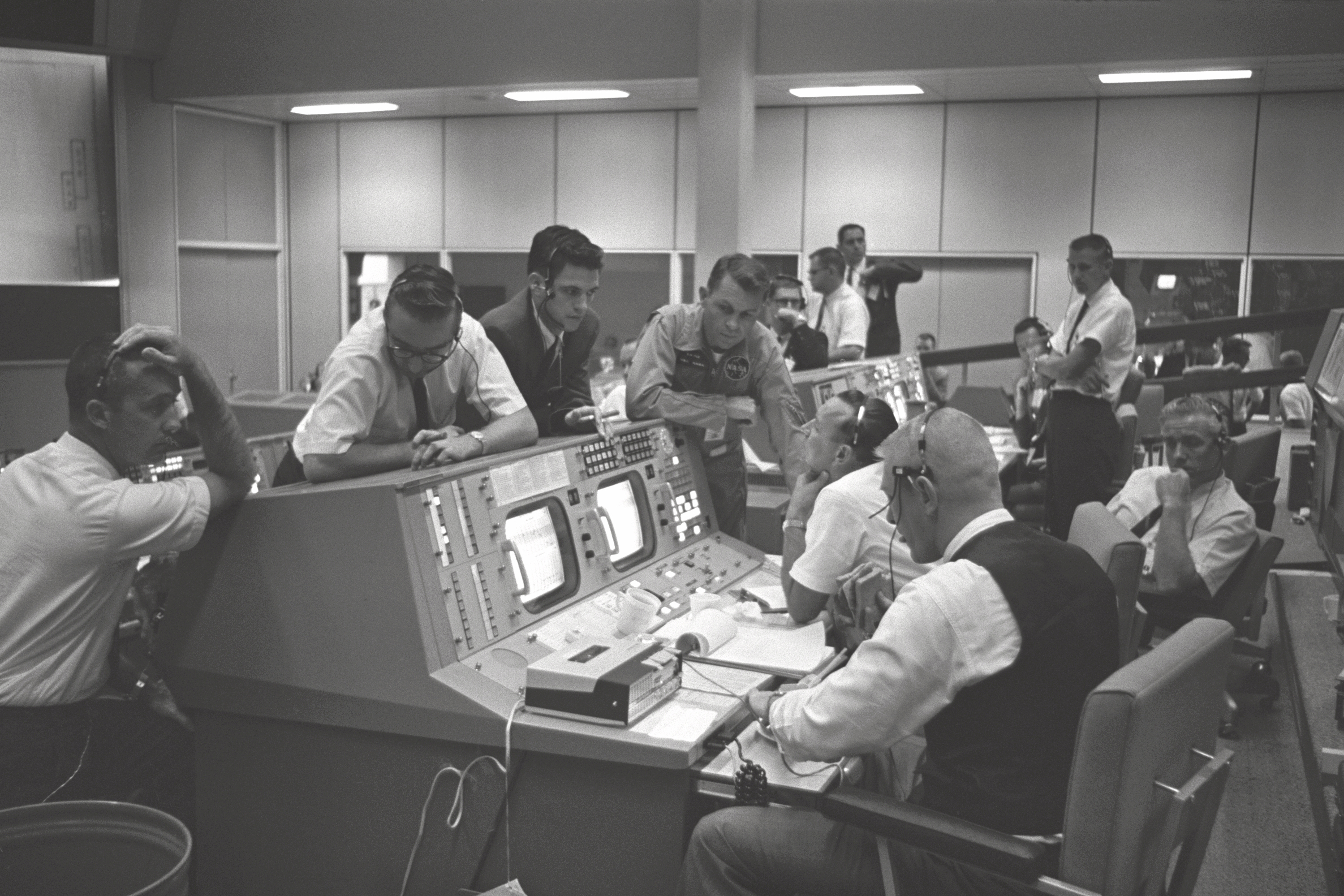
During Gemini 5, Kraft (seated at center of console) confers with flight controllers and astronauts. Malfunctioning fuel cells nearly forced the early end of the mission.

The Gemini program represented a string of firsts for NASA—the first flight with two astronauts, the first rendezvous in space, the first spacewalk—and Kraft was on duty during many of these historic events. America's first spacewalk happened during the Gemini 4 mission; Kraft, at his console, found that he had to force himself to concentrate on his work, distracted by Ed White's "mesmerizing" descriptions of the Earth below. He could easily understand the euphoria that White felt at the spectacle, yet he also was mindful of the discipline required to keep the flight safe. White delayed his return to the capsule, and a communication problem prevented capsule communicator Gus Grissom from getting the crew to hear the order to terminate the spacewalk. When contact was finally re-established, Kraft expressed his frustration on his ground link to Grissom:

"The Flight Director says 'Get back in!'"

After Gemini 7, Kraft stepped back from his work at Mission Control, allowing other flight directors to take charge of the remaining missions so that he could devote more time to planning for the Apollo program. He served on two review boards at North American Aviation, the contractor responsible for the Apollo capsule. Yet Kraft still felt pangs at not being at the center of the action, particularly after the emergency re-entry of Gemini 8. Both astronauts and mission controllers had made the right decisions, but, as Kraft confessed to Robert Gilruth, he found himself wishing that he had been the one on the spot.

=== Apollo 1 fire ===
With the beginning of the Apollo program, Kraft expected to resume at Mission Control. He would have been lead flight director on the first crewed Apollo mission (later known as Apollo 1), scheduled to launch in early 1967. On January 27, 1967, the three crew members were killed in a fire during a countdown test on the pad. At the time, Kraft was in Mission Control in Houston, listening in on the Cape test conductor's voice loop. There was nothing anyone could do; before the crew at the pad could get the door open, the three astronauts were dead, having been overcome by toxic gases. Kraft was asked by Betty Grissom, the widow of astronaut Gus Grissom, to be one of the pallbearers at Grissom's funeral at Arlington National Cemetery, Virginia.

=== Public profile ===
Kraft was a household name in America throughout the 1960s. He appeared on the cover of the August 27, 1965, issue of Time, profiled as the "Conductor in a Command Post". In the article, he compared himself to Christopher Columbus, and displayed what the magazine described as "an almost angry pride" in his work. "We know a lot more about what we have to do than he did" Kraft said. "And we know where we're going." The article described Kraft's role in the Gemini 5 mission, and drew on his frequent comparisons of his position as flight director with that of an orchestra conductor.

"The conductor can't play all the instruments—he may not even be able to play any one of them. But he knows when the first violin should be playing, and he knows when the trumpets should be loud or soft, and when the drummer should be drumming. He mixes all this up and out comes music. That's what we do here."

Kraft was surprised at Time's decision to put him on the cover and told the NASA public affairs officer that "they've got the wrong guy. It should be Bob Gilruth ... not me." He eventually came to terms with the idea, and the portrait painted for the cover became one of his prized possessions.

=== Relations with astronaut corps ===
After John Glenn's flight, Kraft had vowed that he would no longer allow his decisions as flight director to be overruled by anyone outside Mission Control. The mission rules, whose drafting had been overseen by Kraft, stated that "the flight director may, after analysis of the flight, choose to take any necessary action required for the successful completion of the mission." For Kraft, the power that the flight director held over every aspect of the mission extended to his control over the actions of the astronauts. In his 1965 interview with Time, he stated:

"[T]he guy on the ground ultimately controls the mission. There's no question about that in my mind or in the astronauts' minds. They are going to do what he says."

Occasionally, Kraft intervened in order to ensure that his conception of the flight director's authority was maintained. By the time that the Apollo 7 mission flew, he had been promoted to head of the flight operations division; thus, it was Glynn Lunney who served as lead flight director and had to deal directly with behavior by the crew that Kraft considered "insubordinate". As Kraft commented in his memoirs, "it was like having a ringside seat at the Wally Schirra Bitch Circus". Mission commander Wally Schirra, annoyed by last-minute changes in the crew's schedule and suffering from a bad cold, repeatedly refused to accept orders from the ground. Although Schirra's actions were successful in the short term, Kraft decreed in consultation with astronaut chief Deke Slayton that none of the Apollo 7 crew would fly again. Schirra had decided before the flight that he would retire after Apollo 7.

Kraft had made a similar pronouncement before, in the case of astronaut Scott Carpenter. After Carpenter's troubled Mercury mission, Kraft wrote, "I swore an oath that Scott Carpenter would never again fly in space." The result: "He didn't."

== Manager and mentor ==
=== Apollo mission planning ===
After the Apollo 1 fire in 1967, Kraft had reluctantly concluded that his responsibilities as a manager would keep him from serving as a flight director on the next crewed mission, Apollo 7, and on missions thereafter. Henceforth his involvement in the Apollo program would be at a higher level.

As the director of Flight Operations, Kraft was closely involved in planning the broad outlines of the program. He was one of the first NASA managers to become involved in the decision to send Apollo 8 on a circumlunar flight. Due to problems with Lunar Module development in 1968, NASA faced the possibility of a full Apollo test mission being delayed until 1969. As a substitute, George Low, the manager of the Apollo Spacecraft Program Office, came up with the idea of assigning a new mission profile to Apollo 8, one that could be flown without the lunar module. The idea was discussed in early August at a meeting between Low, Kraft, Gilruth and Deke Slayton:

"The four of us [...] had become an unofficial committee that got together often in Bob's office to discuss problems, plans and off-the-wall ideas. Not much happened in Gemini or Apollo that didn't either originate with us or have our input."

Low's plan was to fly the mission in December, which left little time for the flight operations division to train and prepare. After agreeing that the mission was possible in principle, Kraft went to his mission planners and flight directors to determine whether they and their teams could be ready within the projected tight schedule. "My head was abuzz with the things we'd have to do," remembered Kraft. "But it was one hell of a challenge."

On August 9, Gilruth, Low, Kraft and Slayton flew to Marshall Space Flight Center in Huntsville, Alabama, where they briefed NASA managers including Wernher von Braun and Rocco Petrone on the planned mission. On August 14, they, along with the Huntsville group, traveled to NASA Headquarters in Washington, D.C. to brief Deputy Administrator Thomas O. Paine. In turn, Paine recommended the mission to Administrator James E. Webb, who gave Kraft and his colleagues the authority to begin preparations for the mission.

In planning for Apollo 8, one of Kraft's responsibilities was ensuring that a fleet would be waiting to recover the crew when they splashed down at the end of the mission. This proved an unusual challenge, because much of the Navy's Pacific Fleet would be on leave over the Christmas and New Year's Eve period. Kraft had to personally meet with Admiral John McCain to persuade him to make the requisite resources available to NASA.

=== Apollo missions ===
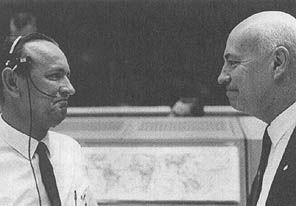
Chris Kraft and Robert R. Gilruth pictured in Mission Control Center

On Christmas Eve, 1968, Apollo 8 went into orbit around the Moon. Only ten years earlier, Kraft had joined Gilruth's newly founded Space Task Group. Now, the two men sat together in Mission Control, reflecting on how far they had come. Around them, the room was filled with cheers, but Kraft and Gilruth celebrated more quietly.

"It was glorious pandemonium, and through the mist in my own eyes, I saw Bob Gilruth wiping at his and hoping that no one saw him crying. I put my hand on his arm and squeezed. [...] He lifted my hand from his arm and shook it strongly. There were no words from either of us. The lumps in our throats held them back."

Kraft again found himself a spectator during the landing of Apollo 11, which he viewed from Mission Control, sitting with Gilruth and George Low. He played a more active role in events during the unfolding of the Apollo 13 crisis. Called into Mission Control by Gene Kranz almost immediately after the accident, he led discussions on whether Apollo 13 should attempt a direct abort, or go around the Moon and return on a free trajectory; the latter option was taken.

=== Mentor ===
Many Apollo engineers, later to become top managers, considered Kraft to have been one of the best managers in the program. He personally hand-picked and trained an entire generation of NASA flight directors, including John Hodge, Glynn Lunney and Gene Kranz, the last of whom referred to Kraft as "The Teacher". In the words of the space historians Murray and Cox, Kraft "set the tone for one of the most striking features of Flight Operations: unquestioning trust—not of superiors by subordinates, but the other way around."

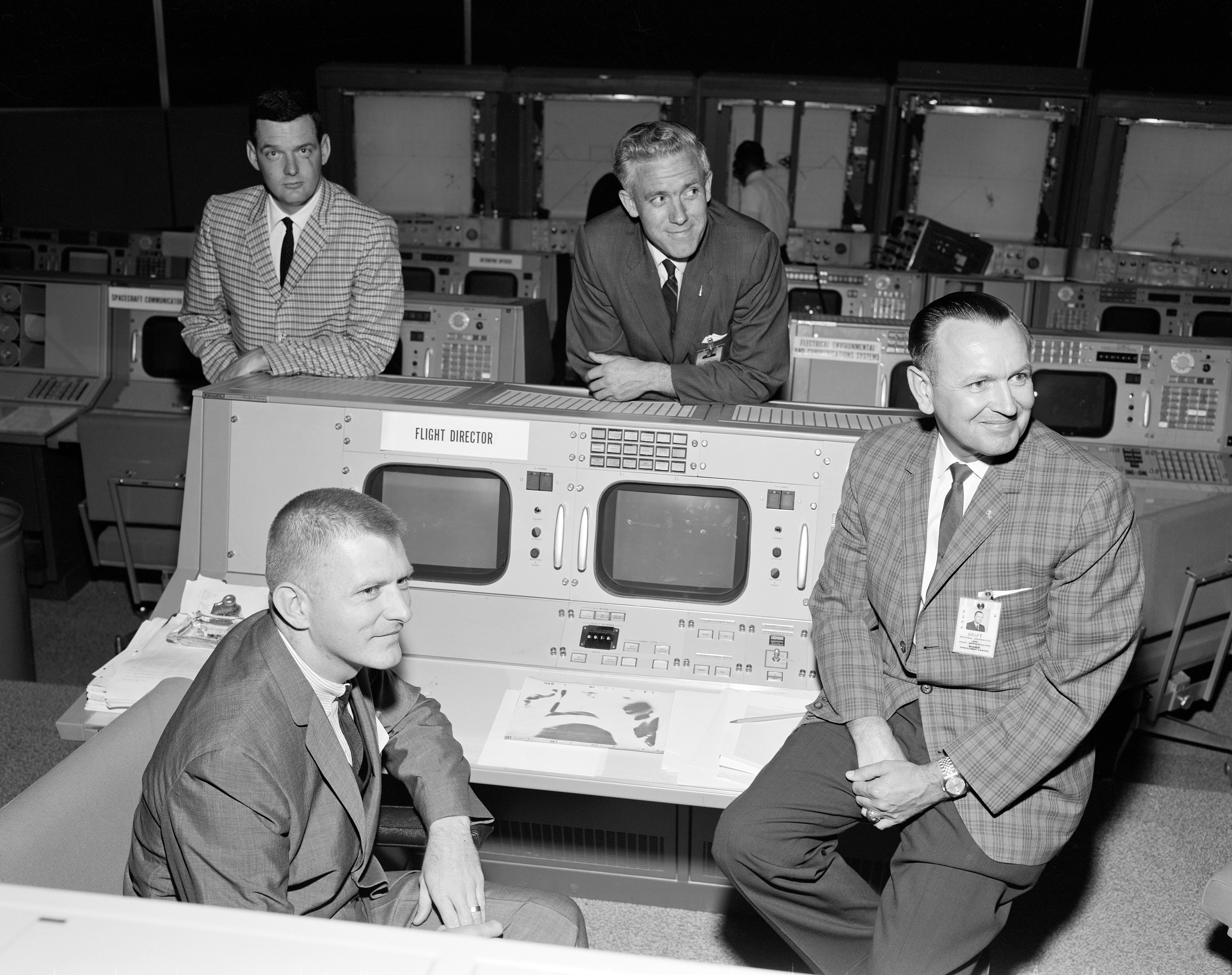
Kraft with his new flight directors before the Gemini 4 mission. (Clockwise from lower right: Kraft, Gene Kranz, Glynn Lunney and John Hodge).

The principles that Kraft had inculcated continued to have an impact at Johnson Space Center long after he retired. As Lunney reflected in 1998:

"He ... instilled a sense of what was right, what was wrong, what you had to do, how good you had to be, and those standards that he kind of inbred into everybody, by his own example, and by what he did with us, continue today. The Control Center today ... is a reflection of Chris Kraft."

Kraft could, however, be a tough taskmaster, making it clear that there was no place in the flight operations division for those who failed to live up to his exacting standards. "To err is human", went one of his favorite sayings, "but to do so more than once is contrary to Flight Operations Directorate policy." Subordinates who seriously displeased Kraft could find themselves deprived of the opportunity to make it up to him. Kraft possessed the power to end careers at Johnson Space Center; as mission controller Sy Liebergot recalled, "if he was behind you, you had as much leverage as you needed; if he was against you, you were dead meat."

== Center director ==
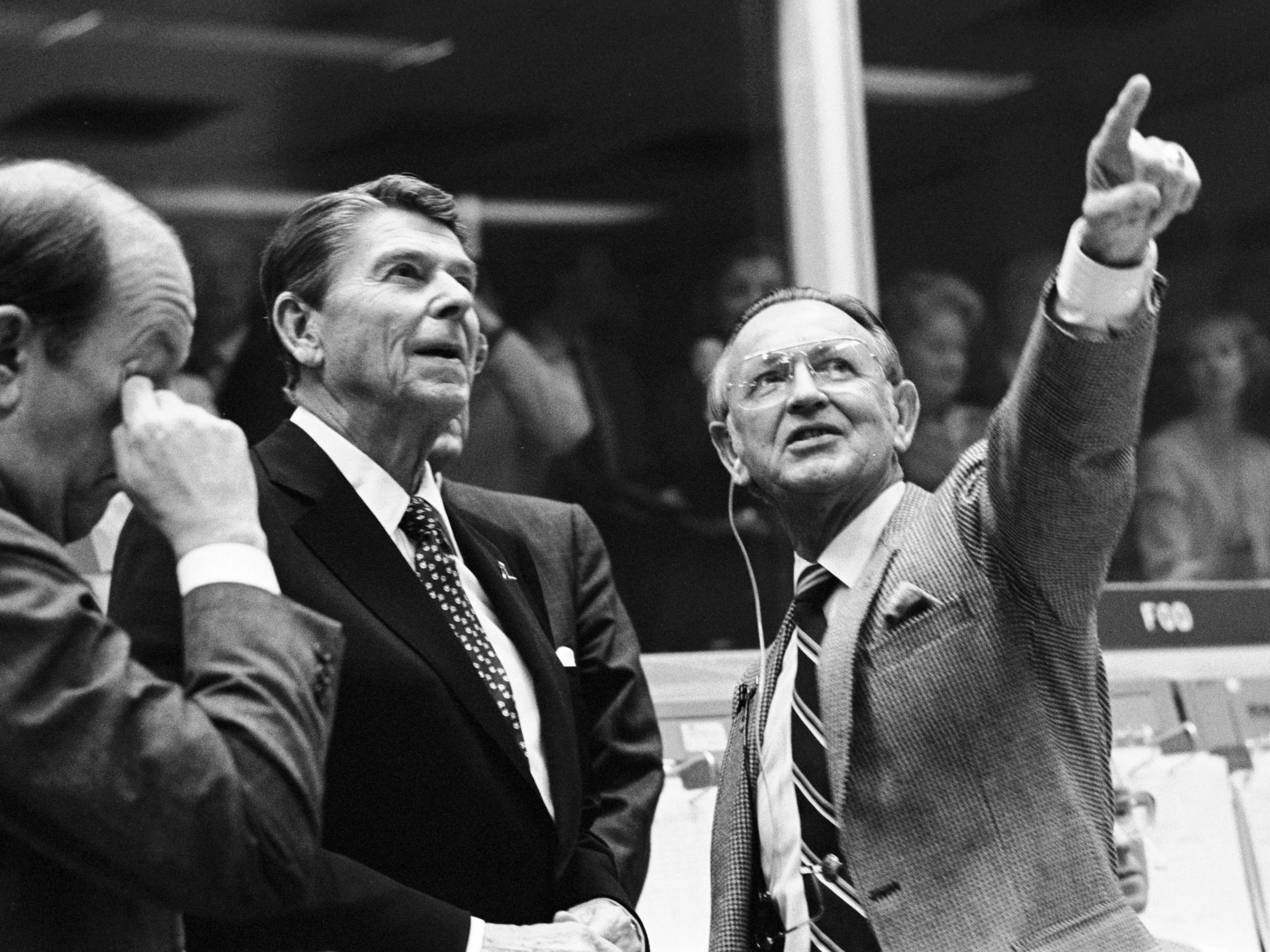
Kraft shows President Ronald Reagan around Mission Control during the STS-2 mission in 1981.

In 1969, Kraft was named deputy director of the Manned Spacecraft Center (MSC). On January 14, 1972, he became the director of the MSC, replacing Gilruth, for whom Kraft had worked since his arrival at Langley in 1945. Space commentator Anthony Young has described Kraft as a "superb successor" to Gilruth, second only to him in the history of center directors.

Kraft was eligible to retire in the early 1980s, but he chose not to take the option. He remained as center director in the status of a "reemployed annuitant," receiving his government pension, but still employed by NASA. In 1981 he had been involved in a conflict with the NASA Administrator and other top officials over the conduct of the STS-2 mission, and over issues relating to NASA organization and management. This contributed to making his position at NASA more tenuous.

In April 1982, Kraft made what newspaper reports called a "surprise announcement" that he intended to step down as center director at the end of the year. He denied that his resignation had anything to do with the threatened possibility of Johnson Space Center losing its leading role in Space Shuttle operations or in the development of NASA's Space Station Freedom.

== Retirement ==
=== Consultant ===
After his retirement, Kraft served as a consultant for Rockwell International and IBM, and as director-at-large of the Houston Chamber of Commerce. In 1994, he was appointed chairman of the space shuttle management independent review team, a panel made up of leading aerospace experts, whose remit was to investigate how NASA could make its Space Shuttle program more cost effective. The panel's report, known as the Kraft report, was published in February 1995. It recommended that NASA's Space Shuttle operations should be outsourced to a single private contractor, and that "NASA should consider ... progression towards the privatization of the space shuttle." It criticized the effect of safety changes made by NASA after the Challenger disaster, saying that they had "created a safety environment that is duplicative and expensive." Fundamental to the report was the idea that the Space Shuttle had become "a mature and reliable system ... about as safe as today's technology will provide."

The report was controversial even at the time of its publication. John Pike, space policy director for the Federation of American Scientists, commented that "the Kraft report is a recipe for disaster. They are basically saying dismantle the safety and quality assurance mechanisms set in place after the Challenger accident." NASA's Aerospace Safety Advisory Panel took issue with the report, saying in May 1995 that "the assumption that the Space Shuttle systems are now 'mature' smacks of a complacency which may lead to serious mishaps." Nonetheless, NASA accepted the recommendations of the report, and in November 1995, responsibility for shuttle operations was turned over to the United Space Alliance.

Nine years later, the Kraft report was again criticized, this time by the Columbia Accident Investigation Board (CAIB) as part of its consideration of the organizational and cultural causes of the Columbia disaster. "The report," it said, "characterized the Space Shuttle program in a way that the Board judges to be at odds with the realities of the Shuttle Program." According to the CAIB, the Kraft report had contributed to the undesirable safety culture within NASA, allowing NASA to view the shuttle as an operational—rather than experimental—vehicle, and distracting attention from continuing engineering anomalies.

=== Autobiography ===
In 2001, Kraft published his autobiography, Flight: My Life in Mission Control. It dealt with his life up until the end of the Apollo program, only briefly mentioning his time as center director in the epilogue. The New York Times review space writer Henry S. F. Cooper Jr. called it a "highly readable memoir", while the Kirkus Review summed it up as a "[s]nappy, highly detailed account of ... 20th century America's most dramatic technological achievement." Reviewers almost unanimously commented on the outspokenness of Kraft's storytelling, and his readiness to personally criticize those with whom he had disagreed. Cooper noted that Kraft "pull[s] no punches about some of [his colleagues'] shortcomings", and Kliatt magazine said that he "isn't afraid to name names".

== Personal life ==
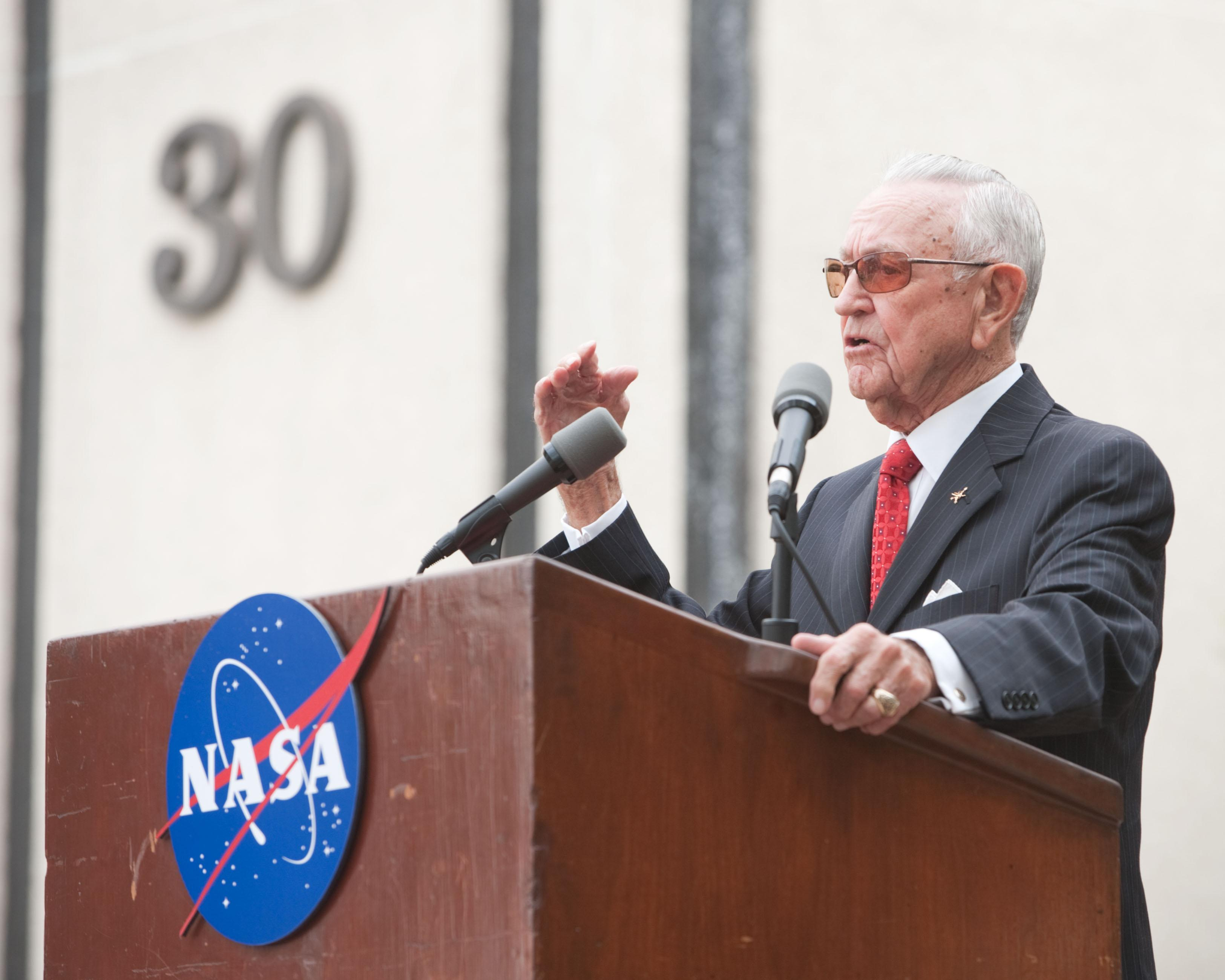
Kraft speaks at a ceremony for the renaming of the Mission Control Center in his honor, April 14, 2011

In 1950, Kraft married Betty Anne Kraft (née Turnbull) whom he had met in high school. They had two children, Gordon and Kristi-Anne. In his autobiography, Kraft acknowledged the sacrifices that his family had made as a result of his work for NASA, saying that "I was ... more of a remote authority figure to Gordon and Kristi-Anne than a typical American father."

Kraft was an Episcopalian, serving as a lay reader at his local church. During the sixties, the Kraft family was deeply involved in church activities: Betty Anne taught Sunday school and served on the altar guild; Gordon was an acolyte; and Kristi-Anne sang in the choir. In addition to his duties as a lay reader, Kraft spent some time teaching a class in adult Bible study. As he recalled:

"I lacked the fundamentalist verve and drove people away when I tried too hard to relate the early church to more modern interpretations. It was hard not to be modern when I spent my working days sending men into space."

Kraft had been an avid golfer ever since he was introduced to the game in the 1940s by his friend and NASA colleague Sig Sjoberg. He cited the good golfing as a reason for staying in Houston after his retirement.

Kraft died on July 22, 2019, in Houston, aged 95, two days after the 50th anniversary of the Apollo 11 moonwalks. The cause was not announced.

== Awards and honors ==
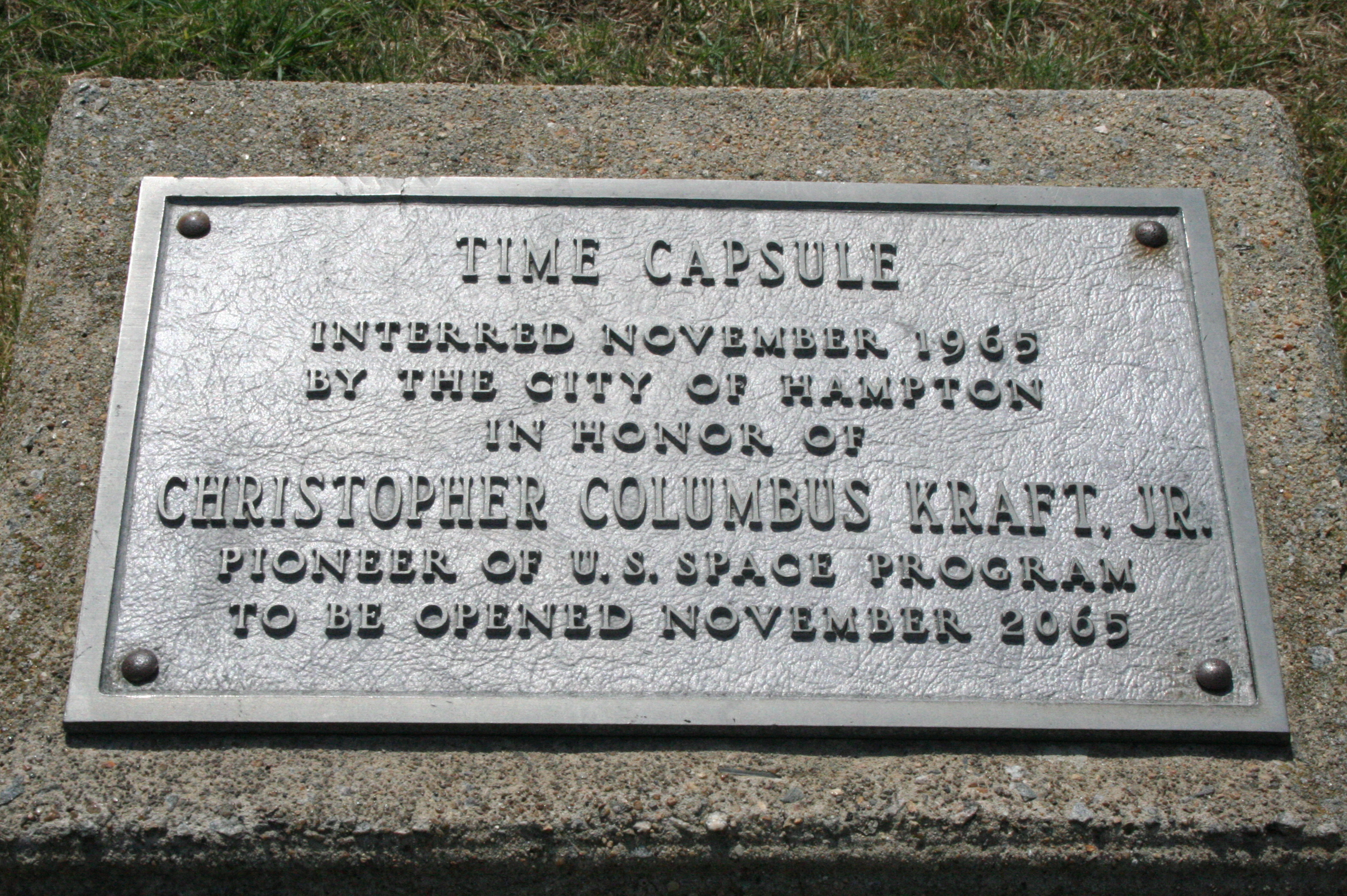
Time capsule placed in Kraft's honor at Air Power Park in Hampton, Virginia

Kraft received numerous awards and honors for his work. At the end of the Mercury program, he was invited to attend a ceremony in the White House Rose Garden, where he received the NASA Outstanding Leadership Medal from President John F. Kennedy and Administrator of NASA James E. Webb. "None of us have many days in our lives like that one," Kraft remembered. The NASA Distinguished Service Medal was awarded to him twice in 1969 (for Apollo 8 and Apollo 11), in 1981 for the Space Shuttle, and in 1982 as a special award.

He won the Distinguished Citizen Award, given to him by the city of Hampton, Virginia in 1966; the John J. Montgomery Award in 1963; the ASME Medal in 1973; and the Goddard Memorial Trophy, awarded by the National Space Club, and the Roger W. Jones Award for Executive Leadership in 1979. In 1999, he was awarded the National Space Trophy from the Rotary National Award for Space Achievement Foundation, which described him as "a driving force in the U.S. human space flight program from its beginnings to the Space Shuttle era, a man whose accomplishments have become legendary".

In 2006, NASA gave Kraft the Ambassador of Exploration Award, which carried with it a sample of lunar material brought back by Apollo 11. Kraft in turn presented the award to his alma mater, Virginia Tech, for display in its College of Engineering. He was inducted into the National Aviation Hall of Fame, on October 1, 2016. The Mission Control Center at the Johnson Space Center was renamed the Christopher C. Kraft Jr. Mission Control Center in his honor in 2011, and Kraft Elementary School in Hampton, Virginia, near his hometown, was named for him.

== In media ==
Kraft was portrayed by Stephen Root in the 1998 miniseries From the Earth to the Moon. He has been interviewed in numerous documentaries about the space program, including Apollo 13: To the Edge and Back (PBS). In 2018, he was portrayed in the film First Man by J. D. Evermore. In 2020, he was portrayed in the mini-series The Right Stuff by Eric Ladin. In the 2019 BBC Proms live performance of their album The Race for Space, a few days after Kraft's death, Public Service Broadcasting dedicated their performance of "Go!" to Kraft's memory.

== Works cited ==
- Bilstein, Roger E. (1989). Orders of Magnitude: A History of the NACA and NASA, 1915–1990 (PDF). NASA. SP-4406.
- Brooks, Courtney G.; Grimwood, James M.; Swenson, Loyd S. Jr. (1979). Chariots for Apollo: A History of Manned Lunar Spacecraft. NASA History Series. Washington, DC: Scientific and Technical Information Branch, NASA. ISBN 978-0-486-46756-6. LCCN 79001042. OCLC 4664449. NASA SP-4205.
- Columbia Accident Investigation Board (2003). Columbia Accident Investigation Board Report, Volume I. NASA. Archived from the original on December 2, 2006.
- Hansen, James R. (1995). Spaceflight Revolution: NASA Langley Research Center From Sputnik to Apollo (PDF). NASA.
- Harland, David M. (2004). How NASA Learned to Fly in Space. Ontario, Canada: Apogee Books. ISBN 1-894959-07-8.
- Kraft, Christopher C. Jr. (March 1, 1955). Flight Measurements of the Velocity Distribution and Persistence of the Trailing Vortices of an Airplane (PDF) (Report). Washington, D.C.: NACA. 19930084657.
- Kraft, Chris (2001). Flight: My Life in Mission Control. New York: Dutton. ISBN 0-525-94571-7.
- Kranz, Gene (2000). Failure Is Not an Option. New York: Berkley Books. ISBN 0-425-17987-7.
- Liebergot, Sy (2003). Apollo EECOM: Journey of a Lifetime. Burlington, Ontario: Apogee Books. ISBN 1-896522-96-3.
- Murray, Charles; Catherine Bly Cox (1989). Apollo: The Race to the Moon. New York: Simon and Schuster. ISBN 0-671-61101-1.
- NASA (1995). Report of the Space Shuttle Management Independent Review Team. NASA.
- Schirra, Wally; Billings, Richard (1988). Schirra's Space. Annapolis, Maryland: Naval Institute Press. ISBN 1-55750-792-9.
- Swenson, Loyd S. Jr.; Brooks, Courtney G.; Grimwood, James M. (1979). Chariots for Apollo: A History of Manned Lunar Spacecraft. NASA.
- Swenson, Loyd S. Jr.; James M. Grimwood; Charles C. Alexander (1989). This New Ocean: A History of Project Mercury. NASA. Archived from the original on August 23, 2007.
- Truly, Richard H. (2021). "Christopher C. Kraft Jr. 1924–2019". Memorial Tributes. 23: 166–172.
- von Ehrenfried, Manfred "Dutch" (2016). The Birth of NASA: The Work of the Space Task Group, America's First True Space Pioneers. New York: Springer-Praxis. Bibcode:2016bnws.book.....E. doi:10.1007/978-3-319-28428-6. ISBN 978-3-319-28426-2.
