= Roger Chevalier =

American astronomer

- Education: Ph.D.
- Alma mater: California Institute of Technology, Princeton University
- Awards: Allan D. Emil Memorial Award (1982); Dannie Heineman Prize for Astrophysics (1996)
- Scientific career
- Fields: Theoretical astrophysics
- Institutions: Kitt Peak National Observatory (1973); University of Virginia (1979)

Roger Alan Chevalier is an American astronomer currently on faculty at University of Virginia. A cited expert in theoretical astrophysics, his interests include astronomical supernovae environment and gases.

He earned his B.S. at the California Institute of Technology in 1970 and his Ph.D. at Princeton University in 1973 and joined the Kitt Peak National Observatory until he started teaching at University of Virginia in 1979.

== Honors and awards ==
- Elected to the National Academy of Sciences in 1996.
- Awarded the Dannie Heineman Prize for Astrophysics in 1996.
- Elected a Legacy Fellow of the American Astronomical Society in 2020

== Publications ==
- The transition region and coronal explorer, Solar Physics, 1999
- Self-similar solutions for the interaction of stellar ejecta with an external medium, The Astrophysical Journal, 1982
- Wind from a starburst galaxy nucleus, RA Chevalier, Andrew W Clegg, Nature, 1985
- The evolution of supernova remnants. Spherically symmetric models, The Astrophysical Journal, 1974
- The radio and X-ray emission from type II supernovae, The Astrophysical Journal, 1982
