= Konstantin Bushuyev =

Soviet engineer

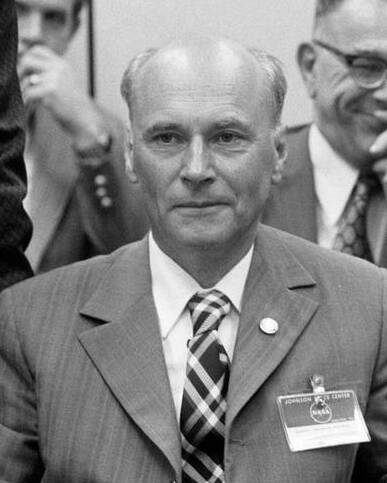
- Born: Konstantin Davydovich Bushuyev; 23 May 1914; Cherten, Kaluga Governorate, Russian Empire
- Died: 26 October 1978 (aged 64); Moscow, Soviet Union
- Awards: Hero of Socialist Labour; Allan D. Emil Memorial Award (1978)

Signature
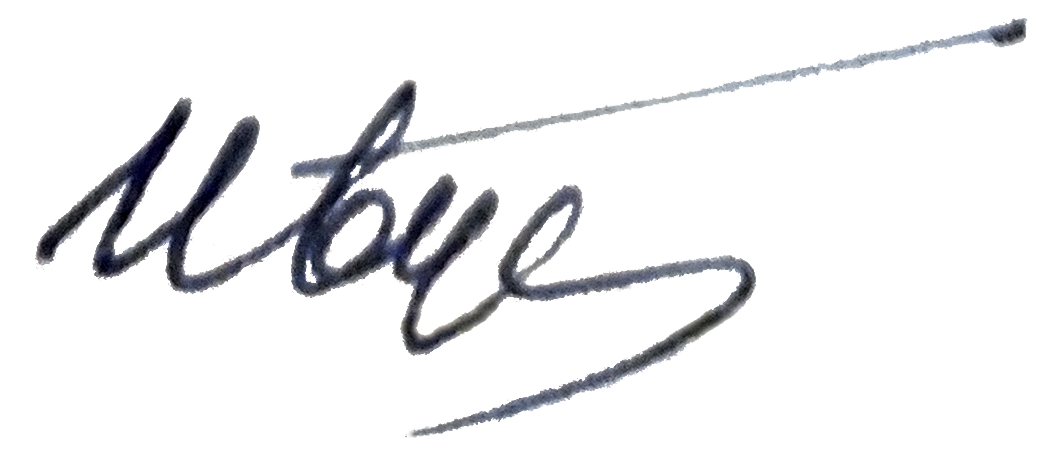

Konstantin Davydovich Bushuyev (Russian: Константин Давыдович Бушуев; 23 May 1914 – 26 October 1978) was a Soviet engineer and director of the Apollo–Soyuz for the Soviet Union.

== Early life and education ==
Bushuyev was born on 23 May 1914 in the village of Cherten, in the district of Mosaik, Kaluga Oblast, in what was then the Russian Empire. He was the son of rural teachers. Bushuyev graduated in 1930 from an industrial college in Pesochnya (later known as Kirov). He was then a foreman and later a deputy shop manager at the P.L.Voikov Moscow Iron Foundry before earning an admission to the Moscow Aviation Institute in 1936. Bushuyev graduated with a degree in aircraft mechanical engineering in 1941.

== Career ==
It is presumed he joined the Soviet rocketry program shortly after the end of WWII; his area of expertise appears to have been applied dynamics. By 1948 he was head of a rocketry design office. Along with other members of Sergei Korolev’s team, Bushuyev was awarded a Stalin Prize in 1951 "for the development of instrumentation for temperature measurement for the R-1 missile flight tests." The launch of Sputnik earned Bushuyev the Hero of Socialist Labour, the highest civilian award in the Soviet Union. He earned a Lenin Prize in 1960.
