= Gerhard Haerendel =

German physicist

Gerhard Haerendel is a German space scientist.

== Life and career ==
Born in 1935, Haerendel obtained his PhD in physics from LMU Munich in 1963.

He was elected as a Fellow to the Max Planck Institute for Physics and Astrophysics in 1969.

He became the director of the Max Planck Institute for Physics and Astrophysics in 1972, and retired in 2000.

== Awards ==
- Fellow of the American Geophysical Union
- Jean Dominique Cassini Medal of the European Geosciences Union
- Space Science Award of the Committee on Space Research
- Van Allen Medal
- Von Karman Award by the International Academy of Astronautics
