= Hispanic Heritage Awards =

Annual awards show

The Hispanic Heritage Awards is an annual national honors presented by the Hispanic Heritage Foundation that celebrates the contributions and accomplishments of Latino individuals. The awards spotlight achievements in fields such as creativity, education, business, science, leadership, and community service. The event is known for combining award presentations with vibrant cultural performances, showcasing the richness and diversity of the Latino experience in the United States.

== History ==
The Hispanic Heritage Awards was established in 1988 by the White House in conjunction with the celebration of Hispanic Heritage Month in the United States. It was created to establish a lasting program to honor Latino Americans who have contributed to society and to inspire future generations through positive representation and recognition.

Initially held as a formal ceremony in Washington, D.C., the Hispanic Heritage Awards has evolved into a major televised event that is broadcast nationally on PBS and supported by over 40 Latino-serving national institutions. The awards show incorporates dynamic musical and artistic performances that showcase the vibrancy and diversity of Latino culture.

The awards are a celebration of the Latino community within the United States, amplifying Latino stories and perspectives while showcasing the richness and versatility of Latino heritage.

== Award Categories ==
- Arts: Celebrates achievements in various artistic disciplines.
- Sports: Honors athletes for their accomplishments and contributions.
- Vision: Recognizes individuals who have demonstrated innovation and forward-thinking in their fields.
- Fashion: Acknowledges designers and other fashion professionals.
- Entrepreneurship: Recognizes individuals who have created successful businesses and contributed to the economy.
- Posthumous Honor: A special award given to individuals who have made significant contributions but are no longer with us.

== Past Awards ==
HHA Edition	Year	Awardee	Category
38^{th}	2025	Rosie Perez	Leadership
38^{th}	2025	Gloria Trevi	Legend
38^{th}	2025	Rauw Alejandro	Vision
38^{th}	2025	Felix Contreras	Journalism
38^{th}	2025	Julissa Prado	Entrepreneurship
38^{th}	2025	Cheech Marin	Arts
37^{th}	2024	Carmelo Anthony	Sports
37^{th}	2024	Julio Torres	Vision
37^{th}	2024	Los Ángeles Azules	Arts
37^{th}	2024	Roberto Clemente	Celebrating the Legacy
37^{th}	2024	Rea Ann Silva	Entrepreneurship
37^{th}	2024	Carolina Herrera	Fashion
36^{th}	2023	Café Tacuba	Arts
36^{th}	2023	Cesar Conde	Media
36^{th}	2023	Omar Apollo	Inspira
36^{th}	2023	Siete Family Foods	Entrepreneurship
36^{th}	2023	Wisin	Vision
35^{th}	2022	Daddy Yankee	Legend
35^{th}	2022	Alejandro Velez	Entrepreneurship
35^{th}	2022	Nikhil Arora	Entrepreneurship
35^{th}	2022	Victoria Alonso	Vision
35^{th}	2022	Ariana DeBose	Inspira
35^{th}	2022	Olga E. Custodio	STEM Award
35^{th}	2022	Los Lobos	Arts
34^{th}	2021	Carlos Santana	Legend
34^{th}	2021	Ivy Queen	Vision
34^{th}	2021	Ron Rivera	Sports
34^{th}	2021	Kali Uchis	Inspira
34^{th}	2021	Clara O'Farrell	STEM
34^{th}	2021	Christina Hernández	STEM
34^{th}	2021	Diana Trujillo	STEM
33^{rd}	2020	Bad Bunny	Vision
33^{rd}	2020	Linda Ronstadt	Legend
33^{rd}	2020	Sebastián Yatra	Inspira
33^{rd}	2020	Selena Gomez	Arts
33^{rd}	2020	Jessica Alba	Business
33^{rd}	2020	Farm Workers	Heroes
33^{rd}	2020	John Lewis	Ally
32^{nd}	2019	Residente	Vision
32^{nd}	2019	Eugenio Derbez	Film
32^{nd}	2019	Alejandro Fernández	Music
32^{nd}	2019	Canelo Álvarez	Sports
32^{nd}	2019	Sylvia Acevedo	Leadership
32^{nd}	2019	Alejandra Y. Castillo	Leadership
32^{nd}	2019	Virginia Kase	Leadership
32^{nd}	2019	Mónica Ramírez	Leadership
31^{st}	2018	Daniel Lubetzky	Entrepreneurship
31^{st}	2018	Sister Norma Pimentel	Community Service
31^{st}	2018	Richard "Crazy Legs" Colón	Culture
31^{st}	2018	Karol G	Inspira
31^{st}	2018	Michaela Jaé Rodriguez	Trailblazer
31^{st}	2018	Ingrid Hoffmann	Culinary Arts
31^{st}	2018	Jesse & Joy	Vision
30^{th}	2017	Gael García Bernal	Vision
30^{th}	2017	Rudy Beserra	Leadership
30^{th}	2017	The Latin Recording Academy	Arts
30^{th}	2017	Alba Colón	STEM
30^{th}	2017	Luis Fonsi	Trailblazer
30^{th}	2017	DREAMers	Inspira
29^{th}	2016	Massy Arias	Wellness
29^{th}	2016	J Balvin	Vision
29^{th}	2016	Junot Díaz	Literature
29^{th}	2016	Fania All-Stars	Arts
29^{th}	2016	George Herrera	Business
29^{th}	2016	Tony Jimenez	Technology
29^{th}	2016	Angélica María	Legend
29^{th}	2016	Prince Royce	Inspira
29^{th}	2016	Justice Sonia Sotomayor	Leadership
29^{th}	2016	Diana Natalicio	STEM
28^{th}	2015	White House Initiative on Educational Excellence for Hispanics	Education
28^{th}	2015	Robert Rodriguez	Vision
28^{th}	2015	Dr. Vladimir Alvarado	STEM
28^{th}	2015	Arturo Sandoval	Master of Arts
28^{th}	2015	Maria Gomez	Healthcare
28^{th}	2015	Pedro Martinez	Sports
28^{th}	2015	Ana Gabriel	Legend
28^{th}	2015	Becky G	Inspira
27^{th}	2014	Carl Hayden High School Robotics Team	Education
27^{th}	2014	Zoe Saldaña	Vision
27^{th}	2014	Pepe Aguilar	Master of Arts
27^{th}	2014	Carlos Vives	Legend
27^{th}	2014	Henry R. Muñoz III	Leadership
27^{th}	2014	Rep. Rubén Hinojosa	STEM
27^{th}	2014	Bernie Williams	Sports
26^{th}	2013	Alberto M. Carvalho	Education
26^{th}	2013	Eva Longoria	Community Service
26^{th}	2013	Lucero	Vision
26^{th}	2013	José Andrés	Design
26^{th}	2013	Juan Pablo Montoya	Sports
26^{th}	2013	Los Tigres del Norte	Legend
26^{th}	2013	María Teresa Kumar	Leadership
26^{th}	2013	National Math and Science Initiative	STEM
26^{th}	2013	Diego Luna	Inspira
25^{th}	2011	Hugo Sánchez	Sports
25^{th}	2011	Dr. Elizabeth Molina Morgan	Education
25^{th}	2011	Dr. Juan Andrade Jr	Leadership
25^{th}	2011	Rubén Blades	Arts
25^{th}	2011	Juanes	Vision
25^{th}	2011	William Levy	Inspira
25^{th}	2011	Jorge Vergara	Business
25^{th}	2011	Roberto "Chespirito" Gómez Bolaños	Legend
24^{th}	2010	Juan Luis Guerra	Arts
24^{th}	2010	Monika Mantilla	Business
24^{th}	2010	Hon. Luis Gutiérrez	Leadership
24^{th}	2010	Mario Kreutzberger "Don Francisco"	Legend
24^{th}	2010	Jaime Escalante	Math and Science
24^{th}	2010	Cuauhtémoc Blanco	Sports
24^{th}	2010	Alejandro Sanz	Vision
24^{th}	2010	America Ferrera	Inspira
23^{rd}	2009	Olga Tañon	Arts
23^{rd}	2009	Dora the Explorer	Education
23^{rd}	2009	Maná	Green
23^{rd}	2009	Romero Britto	Humanitarian
23^{rd}	2009	Sen. Robert Menendez	Leadership
23^{rd}	2009	Richard A. Tapia	Math and Science
23^{rd}	2009	Oscar de la Hoya	Sports
21^{st}	2007	Dr. Inés Cifuentes	Math and Science
21^{st}	2007	Ensemble Cast of Love in the Time of Cholera	Arts
21^{st}	2007	Hon. Xavier Becerra	Education
21^{st}	2007	Hon. Ileana Ros-Lehtinen	Education
21^{st}	2007	Tony Peréz	Sports
21^{st}	2007	Rosario Dawson	Vision
20^{th}	2006	Jim Johnson	Vision
20^{th}	2006	Antonio Banderas	Arts
20^{th}	2006	Dr. Juliet Villarreal García	Education
20^{th}	2006	Lt. Col. Consuelo Kickbusch	Leadership
20^{th}	2006	José Feliciano	Lifetime Achievement
20^{th}	2006	Juan Marichal	Sports
19^{th}	2005	Maestro James Brooks-Bruzzese	Arts
19^{th}	2005	Dr. Jane L. Delgado	Education
19^{th}	2005	Hon. Carlos M. Gutierrez	Leadership
19^{th}	2005	Tab Ramos	Sports
19^{th}	2005	Soledad O'Brien	Vision
18^{th}	2004	John Leguizamo	Arts
18^{th}	2004	Sandra Benitez	Literature
18^{th}	2004	Dr. Gloria G. Rodriguez	Education
18^{th}	2004	Juan D. González	Leadership
18^{th}	2004	Andrés Cantor	Sports
18^{th}	2004	Narcisco Rodriguez	Vision
17^{th}	2003	Sonia Manzano	Education
17^{th}	2003	Linda Chávez-Thompson	Leadership
17^{th}	2003	Denise Chávez	Literature
17^{th}	2003	Omar Minaya	Sports
17^{th}	2003	Anne Marie Tallman	Vision
16^{th}	2002	Father Virgilio F. Elizondo	Education
16^{th}	2002	Lisa Quiroz	Leadership
16^{th}	2002	Ricky Martin	Arts
16^{th}	2002	Julia Alvarez	Literature
16^{th}	2002	Derek Parra	Sports
15^{th}	2001	Gregory Nava	Arts
15^{th}	2001	Judith Baca	Education
15^{th}	2001	Cristina Saralegui	Leadership
15^{th}	2001	Liz Balmaseda	Literature
15^{th}	2001	Mary Joe Fernandez	Sports
14^{th}	2000	Anthony Quinn	Arts
14^{th}	2000	Honorable Cruz Reynoso	Education
14^{th}	2000	Oscar Hijuelos	Literature
14^{th}	2000	Dolores Huerta	Leadership
14^{th}	2000	Sammy Sosa	Sports
13^{th}	1999	Placido Domingo	Arts
13^{th}	1999	Tina Ramirez	Education
13^{th}	1999	Antonia Hernadez	Leadership
13^{th}	1999	Anthony Munoz	Sports
13^{th}	1999	Gary Soto	Literature
12^{th}	1998	Celia Cruz	Lifetime Achievement
12^{th}	1998	Martin Sheen	Arts
12^{th}	1998	Abraham Chavez	Education
12^{th}	1998	Antonia Coello Novello	Leadership
12^{th}	1998	Luis J. Rodríguez	Literature
12^{th}	1998	Rebecca Lobo	Sports
11^{th}	1997	Carmen Zapata	Lifetime Achievement
11^{th}	1997	Andy Garcia	Arts
11^{th}	1997	Amelia V. Betanzos	Education
11^{th}	1997	Hon. Bill Richardson	Leadership
11^{th}	1997	Nicholasa Mohr	Literature
11^{th}	1997	Nancy Lopez	Sports
10^{th}	1996	Carmen Delgado-Votaw	Education
10^{th}	1996	Oscar De La Renta	Lifetime Achievement
10^{th}	1996	Hon. Federico F. Peña	Leadership
10^{th}	1996	Isabel Allende	Literature
10^{th}	1996	Jimmy Smits	Performing Arts
10^{th}	1996	Bobby Bonilla	Sports
9^{th}	1995	Amb. Minerva Bernardino	Education
9^{th}	1995	Raul Julia	Lifetime Achievement
9^{th}	1995	José Antonio Burciaga	Literature
9^{th}	1995	Israel "Cachao" Lopez	Performing Arts
9^{th}	1995	Dr. Ellen Ochoa	Leadership
8^{th}	1994	Dr. Hilda Perera	Literature
8^{th}	1994	Tito Puente	Performing Arts
8^{th}	1994	Dr. Manuel Berriozábal	Education
8^{th}	1994	Baldemar Velasquez	Leadership
8^{th}	1994	Tommy Núñez	Sports
7^{th}	1993	Sister Isolina Ferre	Education
7^{th}	1993	Raúl Yzaguirre	Leadership
7^{th}	1993	Luis Santeiro	Literature
7^{th}	1993	Gloria Estefan	Performing Arts
7^{th}	1993	Emilio Estefan	Performing Arts
7^{th}	1993	Juan "Chi Chi" Rodríguez	Sports
6^{th}	1992	Dr. Antonia Pantoja	Leadership
6^{th}	1992	José Luís "Chegui" Torres	Sports
6^{th}	1992	Hon. Henry G. Cisneros	Education
6^{th}	1992	Luis Valdez	Literature
6^{th}	1992	Edward James Olmos	Performing Arts
5^{th}	1991	Hon. Margarita Esquiroz	Leadership
5^{th}	1991	Eduardo Mata	Performing Arts
5^{th}	1991	Dr. Joseph A. Fernandez	Education
4^{th}	1990	Dr. Pedro José Greer, Jr.	Leadership
4^{th}	1990	Rita Moreno	Performing Arts
4^{th}	1990	Tom Tellez	Sports
3^{rd}	1989	Dr. Hector Perez Garcia	Leadership
3^{rd}	1989	Fernando Bujones	Performing Arts
3^{rd}	1989	Jimmy Santiago Baca	Literature
2^{nd}	1988	Jaime Escalante	Education
2^{nd}	1988	Dr. Nicolas Kanellos	Literature
2^{nd}	1988	Orlando Agudelo-Botero	Visual Arts
1^{st}	1987	Archbishop Patrick Flores	Leadership
1^{st}	1987	Ernest Z. Robles	Education
1^{st}	1987	Jesse Treviño	Visual Arts
