= Hispanic Heritage Foundation =

Non-profit organization based in Washington, D.C.

The Hispanic Heritage Foundation is a non-profit organization based in Washington, D.C. that works to increase the number of Latina and Latino leaders in society. As of 2010, the Chairman was Pedro José Greer.

The foundation hosts several long-term programs, including:

- The Hispanic Heritage Youth Awards, created in 1998, which honor Latina/o high school students (organized into regions or "markets") who demonstrate leadership potential and support them as they move through college and into graduate school and/or the workplace, especially in the STEM fields and in the "Green Industry". As of 2013, the award categories include (in alphabetical order) Business/Entrepreneurship, Education, Engineering/Mathematics, Healthcare/Science and Innovation/Technology.
- a Youth Speakers Bureau, an outreach program in which the Youth Award recipients visit schools and other community centers and use social networking tools to provide information and inspiration to young Latinos/as.
- the Latinos on Fast Track (LOFT) Workforce Program, created in collaboration with the Hispanic College Fund to prepare Latina/o professionals for the workplace. The LOFT program also works with Human Resource departments and corporate diversity programs to place new workers. LOFT also houses the LOFT Innovation branch, the technology and computer programming program, with an office located in Los Angeles, CA.
- the Hispanic Heritage Awards, founded in 1987 as part of the first Hispanic Heritage Month and hosted by over thirty-five national Hispanic organizations, which honor the contributions of Latinas/os in the fields of (alphabetically) arts, education, leadership, literature, math/science, and sports, as well as Vision and Lifetime Achievement Awards. In recent years, the awards ceremony has been televised on both NBC, Telemundo, and Mundo Fox.

Selected winners in each category include:

  - Arts: Rita Moreno, Edward James Olmos, Gloria Estefan, Tito Puente, Jimmy Smits, Andy Garcia, Martin Sheen, Antonio Banderas, Plácido Domingo, Anthony Quinn, Ricky Martin, John Leguizamo, Selena Gomez, Kali Uchis
  - Business: Monika Mantilla
  - Education: Virgilio Elizondo, Ileana Ros-Lehtinen, Jane Delgado, Henry Cisneros, Jaime Escalante, Isolina Ferré, Alberto Carvahlo, Carmen Delgado Votaw
  - Leadership: Pedro José Greer, Patrick Flores, Hector P. Garcia, Federico Peña, Bill Richardson, Linda Chavez-Thompson, Dolores Huerta, Antonia Novello
  - Literature: Julia Alvarez, Jimmy Santiago Baca, Luis Valdez, Isabel Allende, Nicholasa Mohr, Gary Soto, Oscar Hijuelos, Denise Chavez
  - Math and Science: Richard A. Tapia, Jaime Escalante
  - Sports: Mary Joe Fernandez, Sammy Sosa, Nancy Lopez, Derek Parra, Juan "Chi-Chi" Rodríguez, Bobby Bonilla, Rebecca Lobo, Andrés Cantor, Tab Ramos, Omar Minaya, Anthony Muñoz, Oscar De La Hoya, Ron Rivera
  - Vision: Narciso Rodriguez, Soledad O'Brien, Rosario Dawson, James A. Johnson
  - Inspira Award: America Ferrera
  - Legend: Don Francisco
  - Lifetime Achievement: Raul Julia, Oscar de la Renta, Celia Cruz, Carmen Zapata, José Feliciano
