= Campanas de America =

Mariachi band

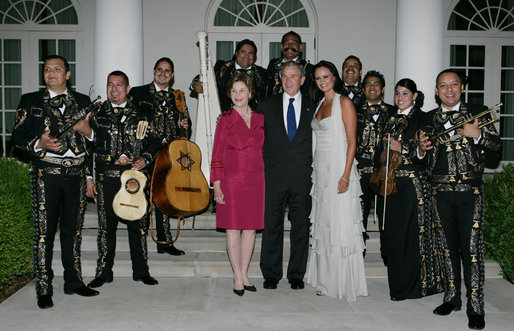
President George W. Bush and First Lady Laura Bush pose with singer Shaila Dúrcal, Dorio Ferreira Sanchez and the Campanas de America following their performance in the Rose Garden on May 5, 2008, during a social dinner at the White House in honor of Cinco de Mayo.

Campanas de America (lit. 'Bells of America') is a twelve-piece musical ensemble mariachi band founded in 1978 in San Antonio, Texas. The band name is a pun on the name of Belle Ortiz, the wife of the band's musical director and manager Juan Ortiz and herself an advocate and pioneer of mariachi music education in the U.S. They have performed nationwide, and continue with an active recording career.

Expanding in style from traditional mariachi sounds, the band also uses more diverse instruments including the accordion, keyboards, and a full drum kit. They are the only mariachi band to display an instrument at the Hard Rock Cafe.

In 1996 the band appeared at The Presidential Hispanic Inaugural Gala in honor of the re-election of Bill Clinton, in Washington, D.C.

In 1999, the band reached a wide audience when they appeared on the PBS music television program Austin City Limits, on an episode spotlighting various Mexican roots music performers, in which the band performed as backup for a duet by singer Rick Trevino and his father.

On September 13, 1999, the band performed on the Millennium Stage of the Grand Foyer at the John F. Kennedy Center for the Performing Arts in Washington, D.C., and returned the next year as well, on September 6, 2000.

They performed at the Hispanic Heritage Awards in 1999, 2000 and 2004. Their 2004 appearance was televised nationwide on NBC and Telemundo.

In 2003 they were featured in a performance at the White House for President and Mrs. Bush.

On July 20, 2005, the band won the "Best Mariachi" award at the 1st "Premios Musica Latina de Austin" awards in Austin, Texas, during which they also performed.

== Discography ==
- Campanas de America (Rodven), Thl, 1993
- Lo Que Quiero Es Bailar, T.H. Rodven, 1995
- Campanas de America (Virgin), Virgin, 1996
- Campanas de America (Tejas), Tejas, 2006
