= Clara O'Farrell =

American aerospace engineer

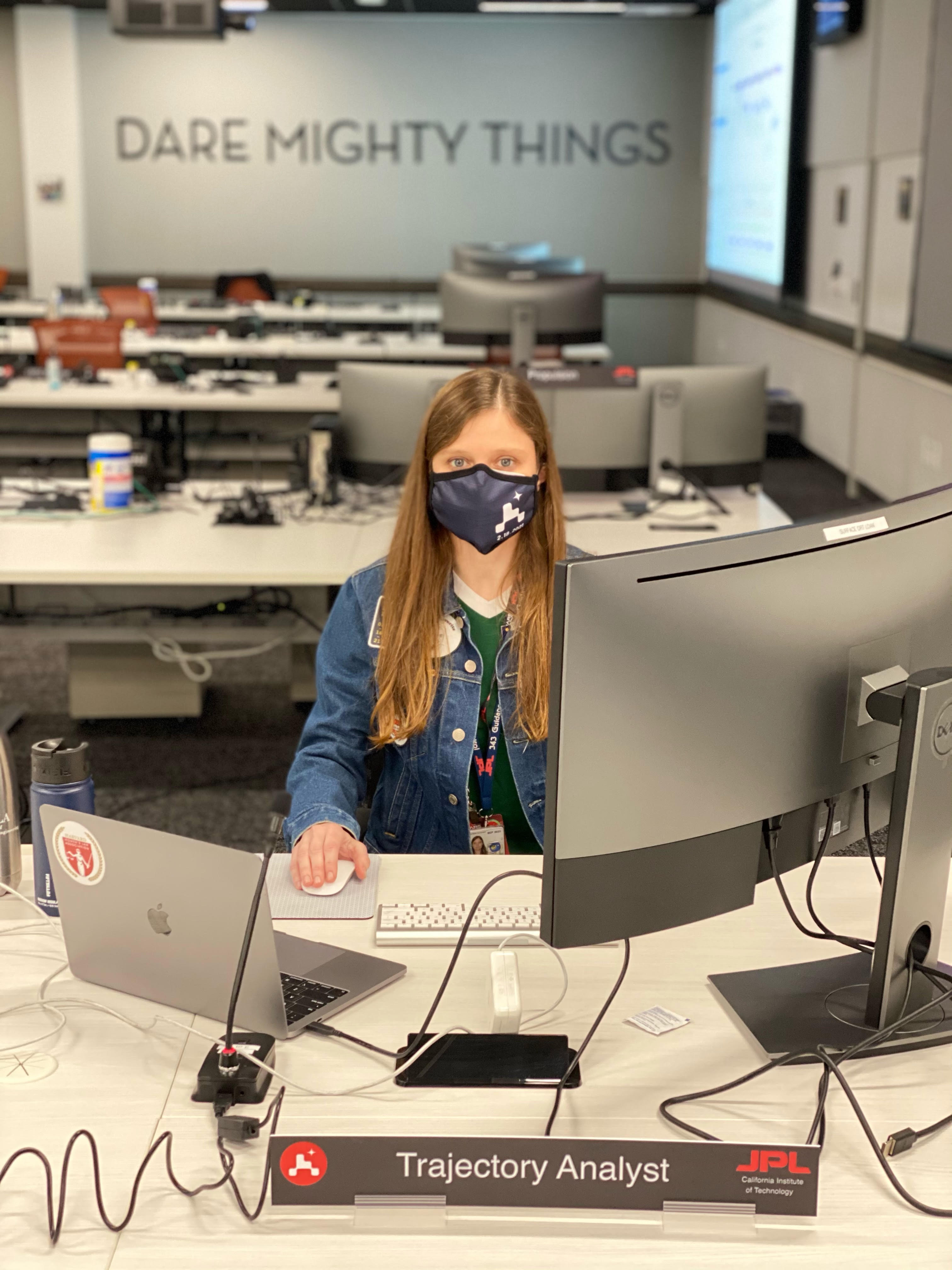
- Clara O'Farrell at JPL in 2021
- Born: Clara O'Farrell; 1984 (age 41–42); Boston, Massachusetts
- Education: Princeton University (BSE); California Institute of Technology (PhD)
- Known for: Mars 2020; Mars sample-return mission
- Spouse: Francisco Zabala (m. 2019)
- Scientific career
- Workplaces: NASA Jet Propulsion Laboratory; Princeton University (BSE); California Institute of Technology (PhD)
- Thesis: A dynamical systems analysis of vortex pinch-off (2013)
- Doctoral advisor: John Dabiri
- Website: claraofarrell.github.io

Clara O'Farrell (born 1984) is a guidance and control engineer for the Entry, Descent, and Landing (EDL) group at the NASA Jet Propulsion Lab who is known for her work on the Mars Perseverance Rover Mission. Her education and research in aerospace engineering focused in propulsion and fluid dynamics, leading her to work for NASA.

== Early life and education ==
She was raised in Buenos Aires, Argentina. O'Farrell's heritage is Irish and she grew up speaking English at home with her mother and grandparents. Her grandparents also own and operated a copper vessel manufacturing factory in Florida, Buenos Aires; where they would mass-produce dulce de leche for distributive purposes. At the age of 19, she moved to the United States to attend college where she realized aerospace was another path for her aspirations. In 2008, O'Farrell earned her Bachelors of Science in engineering (BSE), Mechanical and Aerospace Engineering at Princeton University in New Jersey. As a child, O'Farrell was always interested in science and one of her childhood dreams was to be a marine biologist. As she grew older, she thought her options in science were limited to medicine or engineering. She has credited both her mother and her grandmother for inspiring her work ethic and learning how the world works. In May 2013, she completed her Ph.D. at California Institute of Technology in Control and Dynamical Systems, with a focus on the fluid dynamics of jellyfish swimming in John Dabiri's group.

== Research and projects ==
Miguel San Martin inspired O'Farrell and helped hone her interest in working in aerospace and at NASA. As an undergrad, she joined NASA's Jet Propulsion Lab where O'Farrell worked with John Dabiri, studying the contraction movements of jellyfish as a way to understand and model vortex rings. Also, she worked with Dabiri on Nested contour-dynamic models for vortex rings and vortex wakes. This led her to officially start working at the NASA Jet Propulsion Lab in 2013.

In 2020, O'Farrell was part of the Mars Perseverance Rover Mission for NASA's Jet Propulsion Lab as a guidance and control engineer. She was a member of the group that created the supersonic parachute for the rover that landed on Mars in February 2021. Her simulations on spacecraft trajectory helped guide the Perseverance mission's entry, descent, and landing on Mars. As of 2022, O’Farrell is working on developing a supersonic parachute that will be used to collect soil samples from Mars. O'Farrell has been vocal about her desire to inspire other women and minorities who doubt their abilities in science.

In 2023, O'Farrell had been promoted to Group Supervisor of the Entry, Descent, and Landing Guidance and Control System Group at Nasa JPL.

== Awards ==
O'Farrell was a 2021 recipient of the Hispanic Heritage Awards Honors along with NASA Engineers Christina Hernández and Diana Trujillo.

== See also ==
- Miguel San Martín, Chief Engineer for the Guidance, Navigation, and Control system in the latest missions to Mars
