= California Academy of Mathematics and Science =

Coordinates: 33.861013°N 118.254613°W

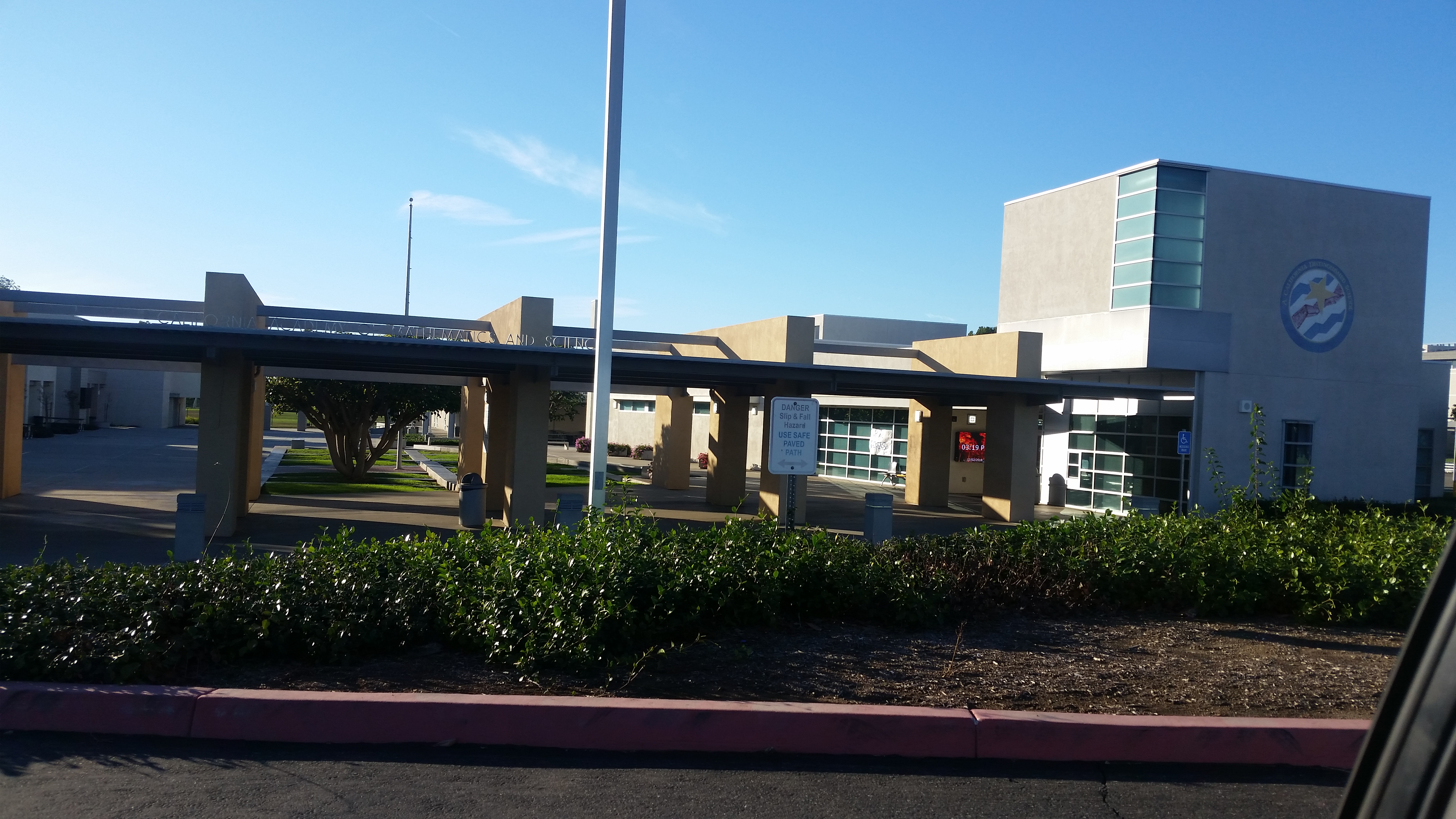

Location
- 1000 East Victoria Street; Carson, California 90747; United States

Information
- Type: Public, Secondary School
- Motto: Educating Tomorrow's Leaders
- Established: 1990
- School district: Long Beach Unified School District
- Principal: Cheryl Cornejo
- Grades: 9-12
- Enrollment: 667 (2023–2024)
- Average class size: 35
- Hours in school day: 6 hours and 47 minutes (8:45 AM - 3:32 PM)
- Campus: California State University, Dominguez Hills (CSUDH)
- Colors: Royal Blue, Black
- Mascot: The Rebels, The Coyotes
- Newspaper: The CAMS Chronicles
- Website: https://cams.lbschools.net/

Ethnic composition as of 2020–21
Race and ethnicity	Total
Hispanic or Latino	43.9%
Asian	39.6%
Non-Hispanic White/Anglo	6.7%
African American	5.1%
Other	4.3%
Pacific Islander	0.3%
Native American	0.1%

The California Academy of Mathematics and Science (CAMS) is a public magnet high school in Carson, California, United States focusing on science and mathematics.

Located on the campus of California State University, Dominguez Hills, CAMS shares many facilities with the university, including the gymnasium, the student union, the tennis courts, the pool, the library and a few of the parking lots. It is a National Blue Ribbon School (2011, 2024) and California Distinguished school.

In the December 2007, Newsweek released the results of a two-year study to determine the 100 best High Schools in the United States of America. Out of the 18,000+ schools reviewed, CAMS made it into the top 100 as number 21. As of 2026, CAMS is ranked by U.S. News & World Report as the 69th best high school in the nation, and in California, it is ranked 7th in the state. According to Niche, CAMS is ranked #1 in Public High Schools in California, #1 in Best College Prep Public High Schools in California, and #1 Best Magnet High Schools in California.

== General information ==
The California Academy of Mathematics and Science (CAMS) opened on the California State University at Dominguez Hills (CSUDH) campus in 1990, the product of partnerships among CSUDH, the California State University’s Chancellor’s Office, a consortium of eleven local school districts, and defense industries. Long Beach Unified School District serves as the managing school district fiscal agent. Today, CAMS ranks in the top ten schools in California on the NCLB Academic Performance Index; its students score well above state and national averages on the math and verbal SATs. Average student daily attendance in 2003-04 was 98%. Attrition is less than 5% for all reasons, as opposed to a 50% drop-out rate in some local high schools. 95% of CAMS students go on to four-year colleges and universities, including the most selective and prestigious in the nation. (Approximately 5% attend community colleges.)

Although CAMS winnows about 175 students from about a thousand of 9th grade applicants each year, CAMS does not rank its applicants for acceptance, but accepts students from each of its 75 feeder schools including predominately inner-city middle schools. Its mission is to “defy the odds” and prove that students, especially those from academically deprived environments, can excel in math and science, given a setting that features integrated curriculum, teamwork, and real world applications of learning. Faculty refer to CAMS as a “talent development program.”

Class size is relatively large, between 30-40 students. The school receives about $5,500 per student annually, placing CAMS is on par with the state average for high schools. (CAMS’s base funding is $4,400 per student; private donations and special legislative funding make up the rest.)

== Campus ==
Because CAMS is on the CSUDH campus, juniors and seniors may enroll in university courses (and some CAMS teachers teach at CSUDH). In the past, students were able to begin taking courses on CSUDH campus as early as their sophomore year. CAMS students may graduate with as many as 20 college credits—an advantage for students applying to selective colleges and/or advancing to early college graduation, particularly with CSUDH classes through a Honda-sponsored program.

In 1993 the school placed 11 students in university dormitories so they could better focus on their studies. Three of the teachers also used dormitories. Two foundations funded the use of the dormitories.

== History ==
Created in 1990 by Kathleen Clark, CAMS was originally composed of the Southern Academic Complex (SAC) and was relatively small in comparison to now. In 2001, five new buildings broke ground to accommodate about 600 students. Phase 2 was completed in 2007 with the opening of Northrop Gruman Technology Lab Building. Clark retired at the end of the 2006-2007 school year after having been principal. Filer, previously a vice-principal, became the new principal beginning with the 2007-2008 school year. Filer retired at the beginning of the 2013-2014 school year, and Brown became the principal.

== Notable alumni ==
- Jeremiah Abraham - Film and Television Producer, Founder & CEO of Tremendous Communications
- Christina Hernández - NASA Systems Engineer
- Leila Janah - Social Entrepreneur, Founder and CEO of Samasource
- Chester Pitts - Seattle Seahawks left guard
