= Anita Valencia =

American visual artist (born 1932)

Anita Valencia (born 1932) is a visual and mixed media artist known for her work with recycled materials.

== Biography ==
Anita Valencia was born in 1932 in San Antonio, Texas to Mexican immigrant parents who owned a grocery store. In 1951, her family moved to a house, where Valencia raised her five children and still lived as of 2017, in the Woodlawn Lake neighborhood of San Antonio to stay close to her younger brother, priest and activist Virgilio Elizondo. She was a student at the San Antonio Art Institute. She also received a Bachelor of Arts degree from the University of Texas at San Antonio in 1984. While at these schools, she specialized in printmaking and started making lithographs. Anita was one of 250 students to be selected to go to Japan to study paper making. She has since begun creating public art, sculptures, and other mixed media art pieces.

== Notable Art ==
Valencia's work is held in the permanent collections of the McNay Art Museum and The University of Texas at San Antonio Libraries Art Collection.Perinolas is 2010 of public art sculpture in the San Antonio Grand Hyatt Hotel where she converted more than 4,000 aluminum cans into 2,500 "colorful whirligigs".

Other notable works of art include the following:

Butterflies is a bench created in 2013 of recycled materials in San Antonio, Texas.

Remembering Memi is a mixed media piece featuring CDs, coffee filters, and acrylics. Created in 2018, it honors the artist's mother, Ana Maria Peimbert. It was featured in an exhibition called “A Voice from the Art of the Sacred Texas Springs.”

Sun She Rise Sun She Set and You Ain't Seen Texas Yet is an installation made of recycled cans, caps, and wire hangers to create a scene of aluminum can butterflies, wire hanger tumbleweeds, and bottle cap cacti. This piece was on display at the Southwest school of Art.

Butterfly Waystation is an installation featuring recycled aluminum cans molded to be in the shape of butterflies. This three-dimensional work features hanging butterflies. This work was featured at Plaza de Armas in San Antonio in an exhibit called “Compositions in Space: Architectural Interventions.”
