= Scanning Habitable Environments with Raman and Luminescence for Organics and Chemicals =

Spectrometer

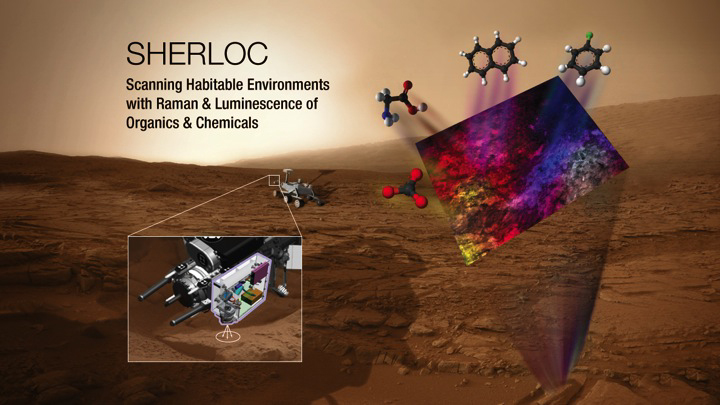
Perseverance rover - SHERLOC

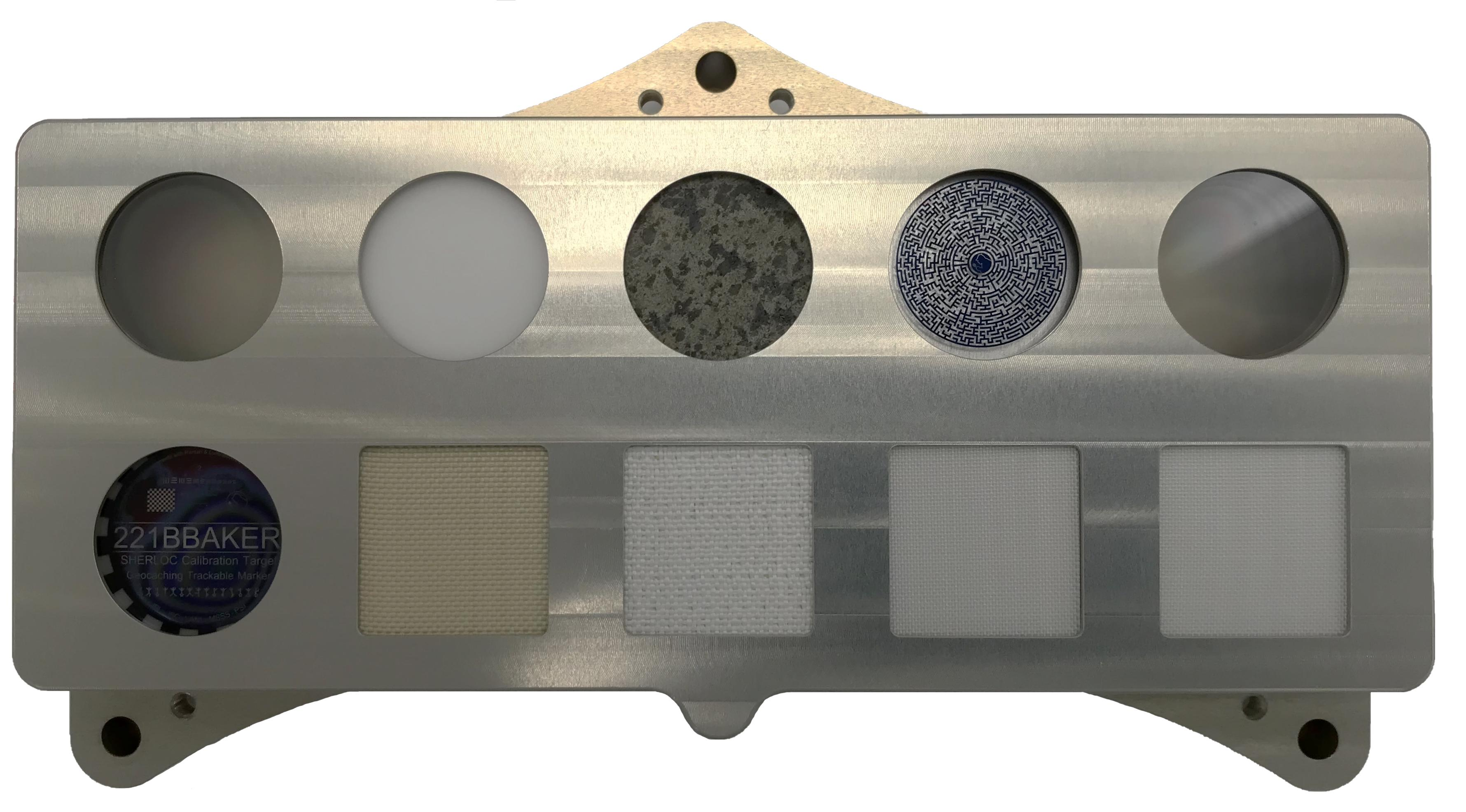
SHERLOC's calibration target aboard the Perseverance Mars rover with Mars Meteorite in the centre of top row

Scanning Habitable Environments with Raman and Luminescence for Organics and Chemicals (SHERLOC) is an ultraviolet Raman spectrometer that uses fine-scale imaging and an ultraviolet (UV) laser to determine fine-scale mineralogy, and detect organic compounds designed for the Perseverance rover as part of the Mars 2020 mission. It was constructed at the Jet Propulsion Laboratory with major subsystems being delivered from Malin Space Science Systems and Los Alamos National Laboratory.

SHERLOC has a calibration target with possible Mars suit materials, and it will measure how they change over time in the Martian surface environment.

== Goals ==
According to a 2017 Universities Space Research Association (USRA) report: the goals of the SHERLOC investigation are to:

- Assess the habitability potential of a sample and its aqueous history.
- Assess the availability of key elements and energy source for life (C, H, N, O, P, S etc.).
- Determine if there are potential biosignatures preserved in Martian rocks and outcrops.
- Provide organic and mineral analysis for selective sample caching.

To do this SHERLOC does the following:

- Detects and classifies organics and astrobiologically relevant minerals on the surface and near subsurface of Mars.
- Bulk organic sensitivity of 10^{-5} to 10^{-6} w/w over a 7 x 7 mm spot.
- Fine scale organic sensitivity of 10^{-2} to 10^{-4} w/w spatially resolved at < 100 μm.
- Astrobiologically Relevant Mineral (ARM) detection and classification to < 100 μm resolution.

== Construction ==
There are three locations on the rover where SHERLOC components are located. The SHERLOC Turret Assembly (STA) is mounted at the end of the rover arm. The STA contains spectroscopy and imaging components. The SHERLOC Body Assembly (SBA) is located on the rover chassis and acts as the interface between the STA and the Mars 2020 rover. The SBA deals with command and data handling, along with power distribution. The SHERLOC Calibration Target (SCT) is located on the front of the rover chassis and holds spectral standards.

SHERLOC consists of both imaging and spectroscopic elements. It has two imaging components consisting of heritage hardware from the MSL MAHLI instrument. The Wide Angle Topographic Sensor for Operations and eNgineering (WATSON) is a built to print re-flight that can generate color images at multiple scales. The other, Autofocus Context Imager (ACI), acts as the mechanism that allows the instrument to get a contextual image of a sample and to autofocus the laser spot for the spectroscopic part of the SHERLOC investigation.

For Spectroscopy, it utilizes a NeCu laser to generate UV photons (248.6 nm) which can generate characteristic Raman and fluorescence photons from a scientifically interesting sample. The deep UV laser is co-boresighted to a context imager and integrated into an autofocusing/scanning optical system that allows correlation of spectral signatures to surface textures, morphology and visible features. The context imager has a spatial resolution of 30 μm and currently is designed to operate in the 400-500 nm wavelength range.

SHERLOC

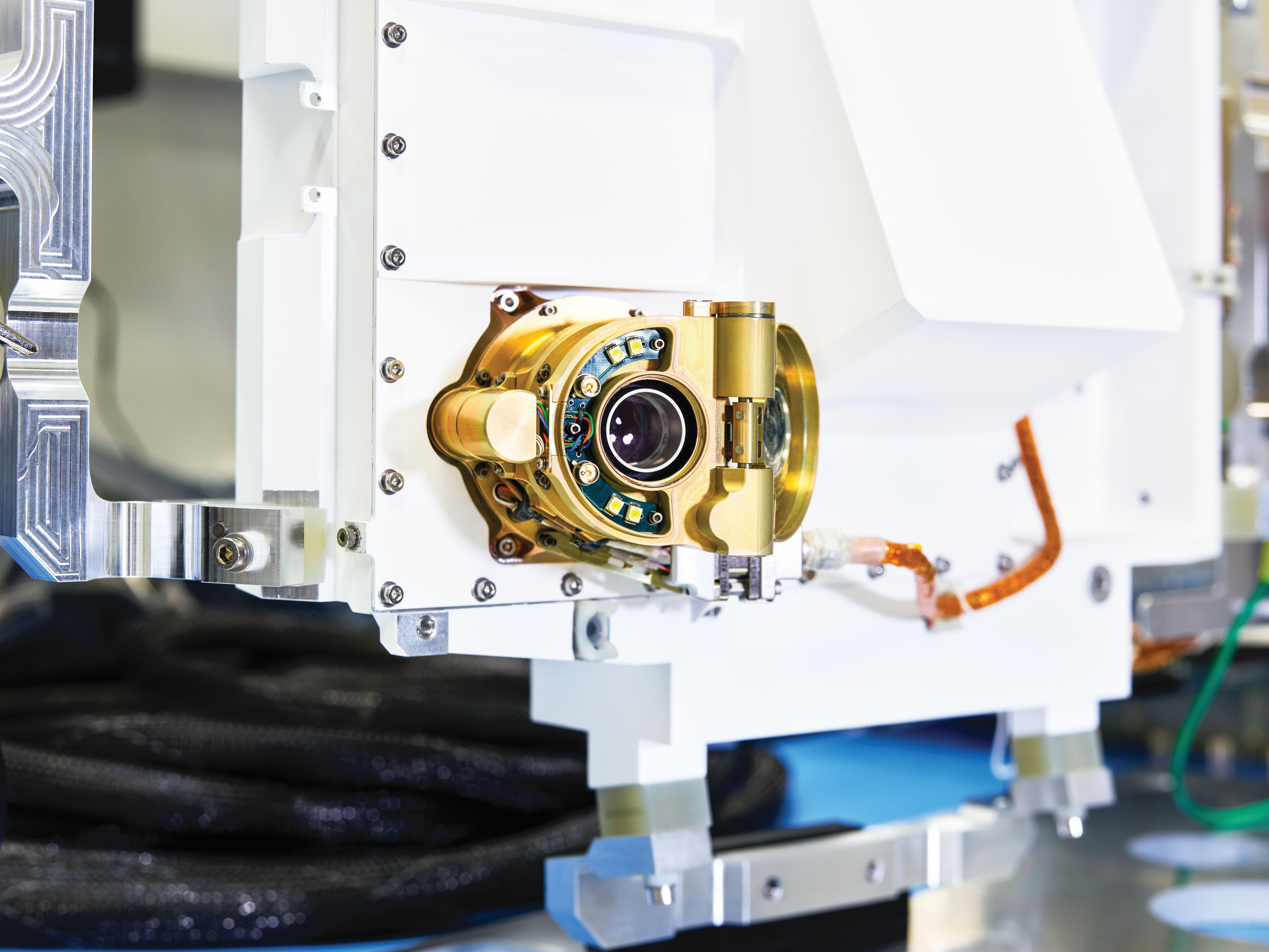
instrument – outside>

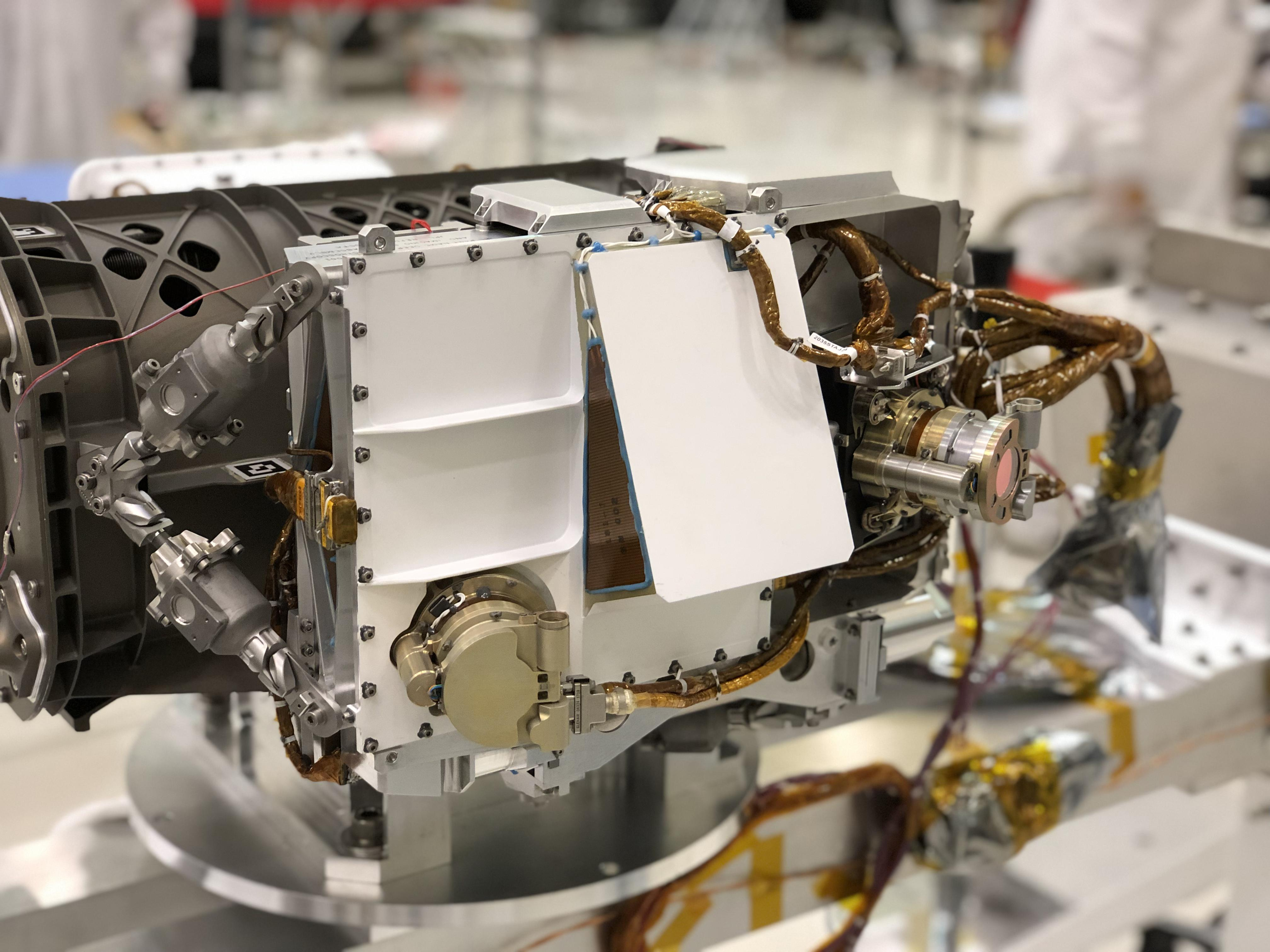
instrument – inside

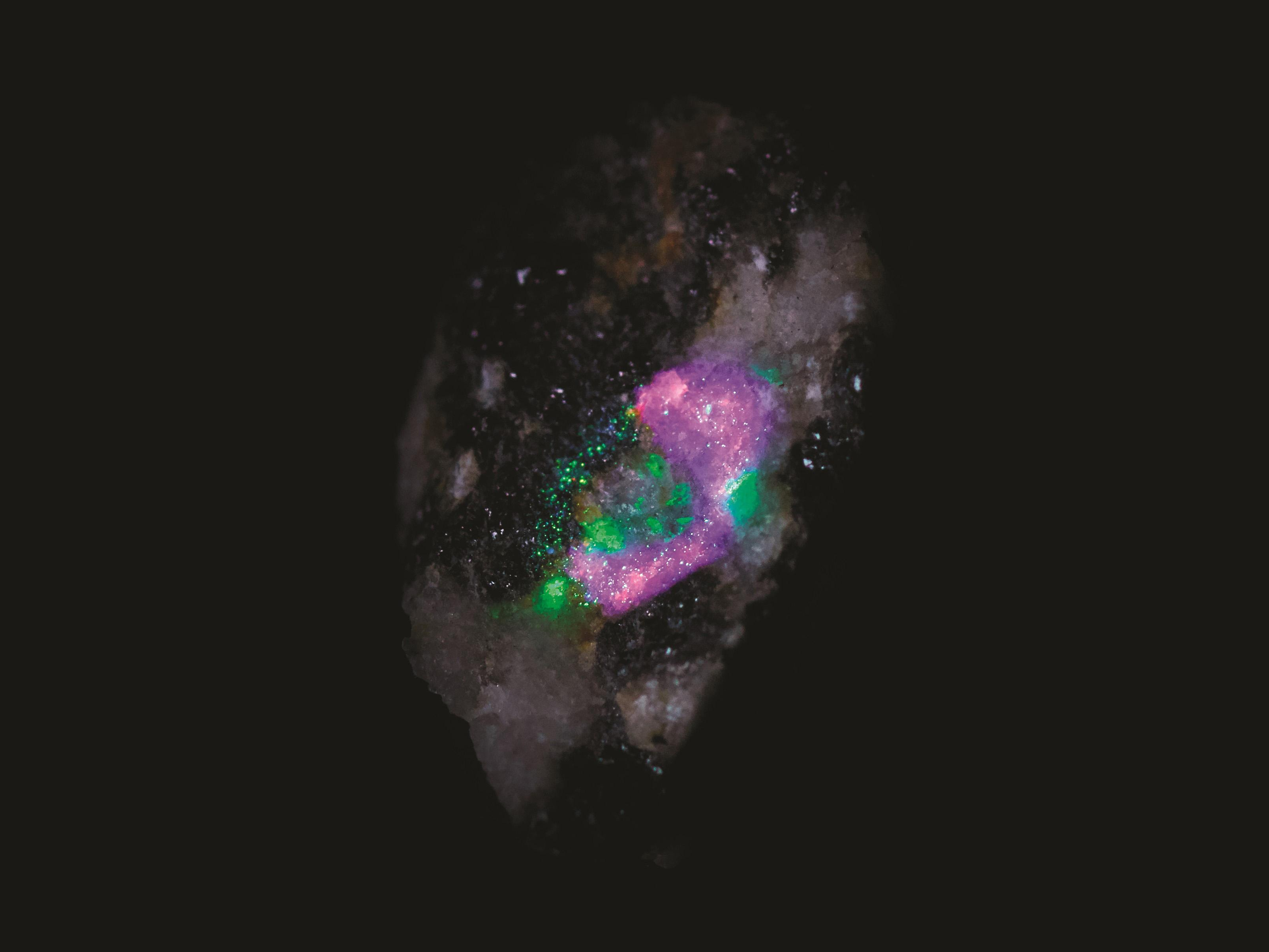
Test image
(26 May 2020)

Test – WATSON camera focus
(Mars; video; 0:05; 10 May 2021)

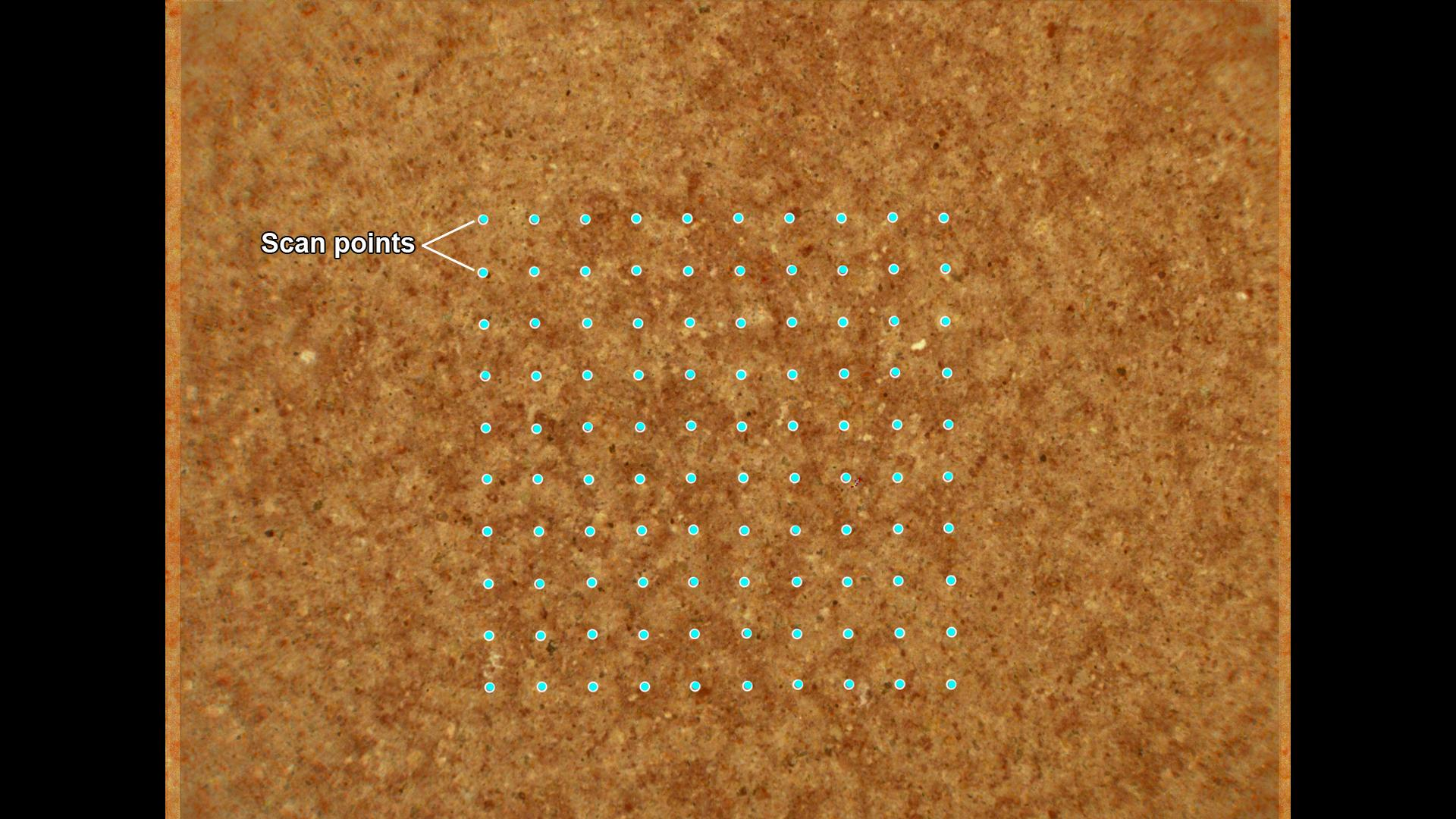
Test rock study
(22 July 2022)

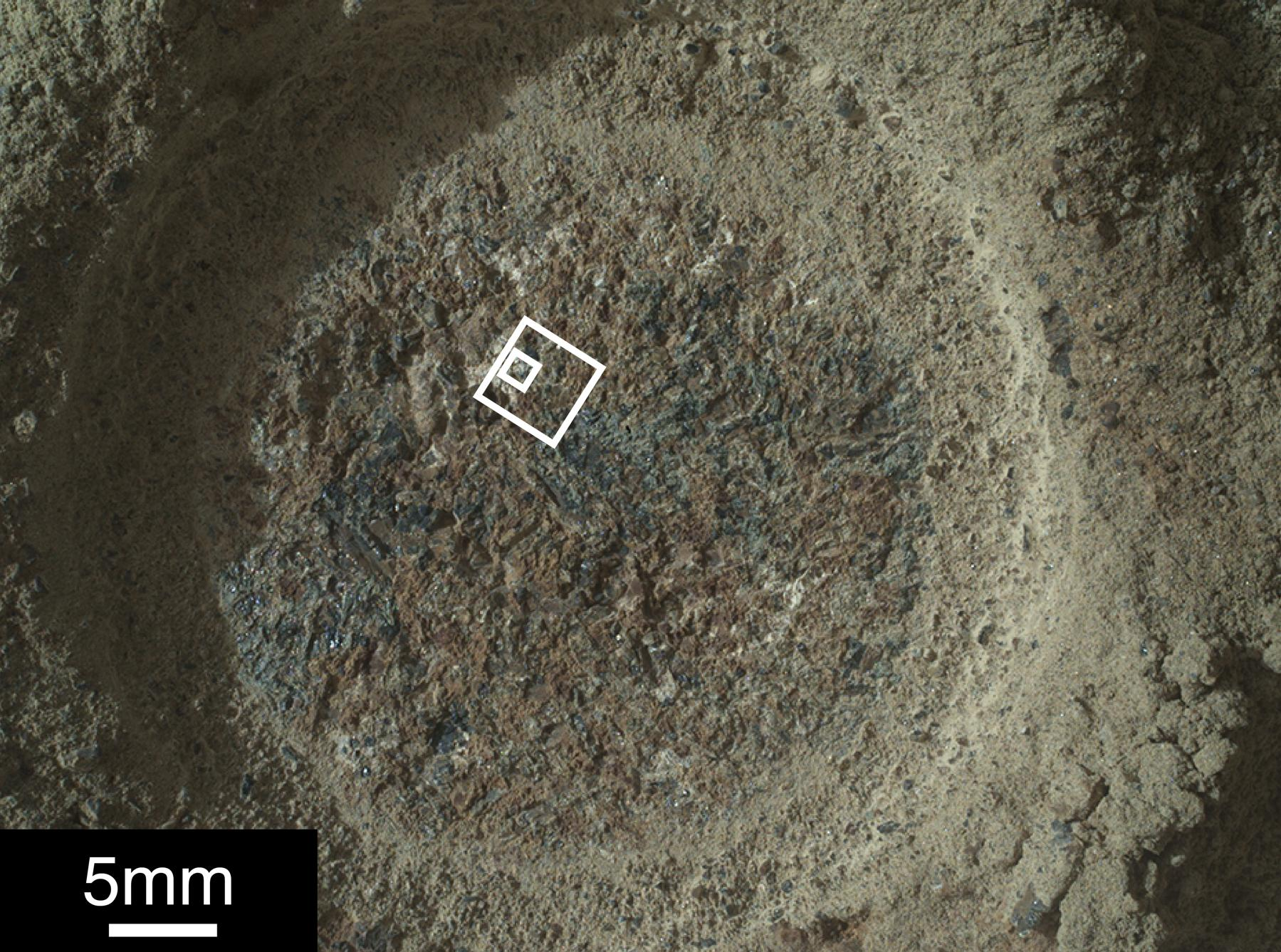
Quartier rock (context)
(12 July 2023)

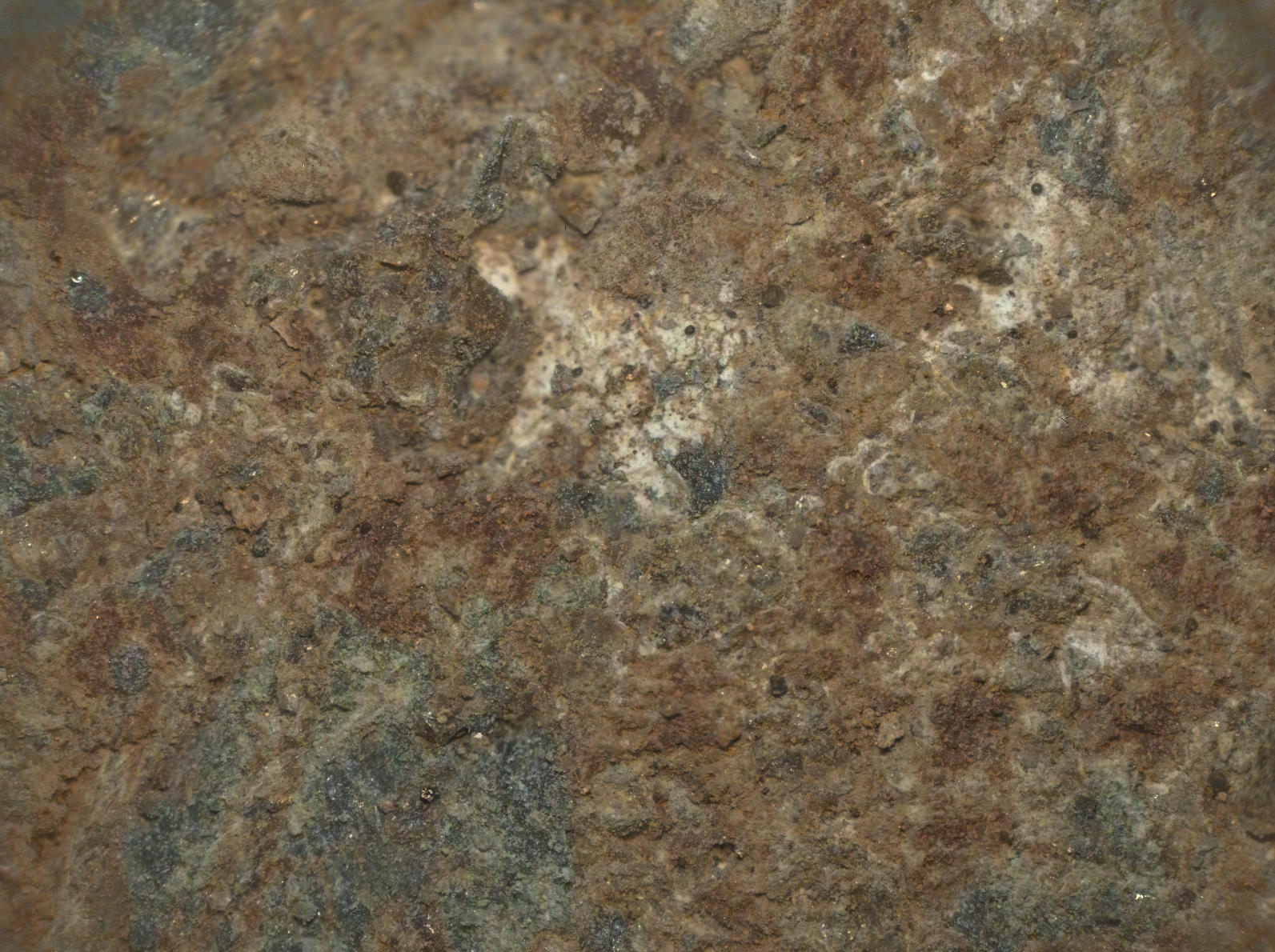
Quartier rock study
(12 July 2023)

== Results from Mars ==
WATSON Selfie image of Perseverance rover and Ingenuity helicopter

Over the course of three years, SHERLOC and WATSON have been successfully collecting spectra and images of minerals and organics on the surface of Mars. Utilizing WATSON and ACI images, there was confirmation that the Jezero Crater floor consists of aqueously altered mafic material with various igneous origins. In addition, WATSON has been used to collect selfies of the Perseverance rover and the Ingenuity helicopter. Recently, it successfully sealed and stored the first two rock samples from Mars. Because of it, we now know that these rocks derived from a volcanic environment, and that there was liquid water there in Mars's past, that formed salts that SHERLOC has seen.

== See also ==
- Composition of Mars
- Curiosity rover
- Exploration of Mars
- Geology of Mars
- List of rocks on Mars
- Mars Science Laboratory
- MOXIE
- PIXL
- Scientific information from the Mars Exploration Rover mission
- Timeline of Mars Science Laboratory
