= National Alliance for Hispanic Health =

- Formation: 1973; 53 years ago

The National Alliance for Hispanic Health (NAHH) is a non-profit and nonpartisan advocacy organization dedicated to improving the health and well being of Hispanics and working to secure the best outcomes. The National Alliance for Hispanic Health is science-based and community-driven.

The National Alliance for Hispanic Health is a paid subscriber to the "Best in America" seal from Independent Charities of America. Funds are not accepted from tobacco or alcohol companies.

The National Alliance for Hispanic Health conducts Signature and Demonstration programs. Signature Programs include Annual STEM Scholarships: Awarded 10 high school students, Health Help Hotline connects consumers to health information and services and, Hispanic Family healthy lifestyle events in 10 cities. Demonstration Programs include promoting enrollment in Medicaid, Affordable Care Act, CHIP, other social welfare programs, and by promoting models for the financial sustainability of local health and human service providers, diabetes prevention, smoking cessation, cancer prevention, and Alzheimer's awareness.

Additionally, the National Alliance for Hispanic Health participates in selected policy promotion as evidenced by collaboration on issues ranging from biosimilars to sugar sweetened beverages to clinical trials. The National Alliance for Hispanic Health provides information through its member organizations, which include national health organizations, community-based groups, universities, hospitals, government agencies, foundations, and corporations. According to PBS, in 2006 it became the oldest network of Hispanic health and human services providers.

The National Alliance for Hispanic Health is governed by a board of directors and managed by its president and chief executive officer, Dr. Jane L. Delgado, who has held that same post continually for over 40 years, since 1985.

== History ==
The National Alliance for Hispanic Health, was founded in 1973 as the Coalition of Spanish Speaking Mental Health Organizations (COSSMHO) and has also been known as the National Coalition for Hispanic Health and Human Services Organizations.

In 1987, the National Alliance for Hispanic Health was at the forefront of working with the federal government to improve its health data research for Hispanic populations in the United States. The initiative was prompted in part by publication of the U.S. Department of Health and Human Services' report on "Black and Minority Health" which had found more complete health and demographic data on American Indians and Asian Americans than Hispanics.

The organization's research work has included the Hispanic Health Research Consortium whose work on the Hispanic Health and Nutrition Examination Survey (HHANES) was published as the first collected mainstream health journal issue to focus on Hispanic health, research on Hispanic youth demographics which reported that Hispanics for the first time were the nation’s largest racial/ethnic group of children, and publication of findings from the first survey of Hispanic communities and emergency preparedness issues.

Among its policy efforts, the National Alliance for Hispanic Health played a role in the landmark Disadvantaged Minority Health Improvement Act of 1990, has been active in protection of patient rights under Executive Order 13166 to improve health access for limited English proficient (LEP) persons, lead health information technology policy efforts, has been active in regulatory oversight of the Medicare Modernization Act, is an advocate for expansion of the Children’s Health Insurance Program, is a vocal advocate on tobacco control policy in Hispanic communities, and advocates for clean air and water in Hispanic communities. In 2007, NAHH partnered with Research! America to field the first national public opinion survey of Hispanics on health and research issues. Most recently, as a complement to its online action network, the organization established the Vote for Your Health effort that delivers election day text message reminders to vote to members.

The 1998 Surgeon General Report on Tobacco Use recognized the Alliance for having "refused the support of the tobacco industry" and alcohol industry and "adopted a formal policy not to accept money from tobacco companies or their subsidiaries."

== Programs ==
NAHH serves Hispanic communities nationwide through its member health providers and organizations. Its areas of health information services have included obesity, diabetes, heart health, high blood pressure, mental health, fitness, physical activity, healthy eating, Alzheimer's disease, Parkinson's disease, environmental health and health insurance, among many others.

Since 2005 the National Alliance for Hispanic Health has as its supporting organization the Healthy Americas Foundation. Both organizations operate a variety of programs. In 2012 NAHH partnered with USC and created the sister organization, Healthy Americas Institute, at the Keck School of Medicine.

== See also ==
- Dr. Jane L. Delgado
