= Rea Ann Silva =

American makeup artist, inventor of the Beauty blender

- Born: Rea Ann Silva; October 1961 (age 64); Los Angeles, CA
- Education: Fashion Institute of Design & Merchandising
- Occupations: CEO/Owner, Rea.Deeming Beauty Inc.
- Known for: Founding Beautyblender
- Partner(s): Rory Nix (Current); Eric Dickerson (1984-1987)
- Children: 2
- Website: beautyblender.com

Rea Ann Silva (born 1961) is the creator of the Beauty blender makeup application sponge and the founder and CEO of the Beauty blender company. Silva created the sponge while working as a make-up artist for the Girlfriends television series. In 2019, her company's sales were expected to reach $215 million.

== Early life and education ==
Silva was raised in Los Angeles, California, to a working-class Latino family. Her mother was a waitress and her father worked as an auto mechanic at a Ford Motor Company factory.

She attended the Fashion Institute of Design and Merchandising in Los Angeles, California, where she was a first-generation college student.

== Career ==
Silva initially entered the beauty space by selling perfume at a department store, but eventually moved over to the store's cosmetics counter. She became a make-up artist, eventually switching from retail into TV and Film makeup. She has years of experience, working for artists such as Dr. Dre, Eve, Tupac, and Brandy during her tenure at MTV. She also worked with entertainers such as Regina King, Kerry Washington, and Macy Gray, according to the National Museum of History. According to IMDB Silva also worked on sets for movies such as “Friday” (1995), “Money Talks”(1997), and “Idle Hands”(1999) in addition to T.V shows like “Girlfriends” and “Moesha” prior to her creation of the Beauty blender.

=== Creation of the Beauty Blender ===
According to MSNBC, the beauty blender was created as a tool to avoid the hassle of having to use an airbrush, which required actors to be pulled offset, to apply foundation on set. Because of the sponge's convenience, Silva was able to create a simple prototype of the sponge. In 2002, she began to capitalize on the product. She worked alongside Catherine Bailey, at the time an executive assistant at Victoria Vogue (a cosmetics manufacturing company), at first catering the product to industry professionals, such as make-up artists. In 2008, Silva began selling directly to consumers, initially through small boutique makeup stores. The brand had a short partnership with Victoria's Secret, prior to the company taking its beauty business in-house, and then expanded into large makeup retailers, like Sephora in 2012 and Ulta Beauty in 2018. The beauty blender would go on to win her multiple awards as well as elevate her company to the top of the beauty industry.

== Personal life ==
Silva has one daughter with the ex-Rams running back, Eric Dickerson, and a son named Cruz Nix with her husband Rory Nix.

Silva identifies as Latina coming from Mexican, Spanish, and Native American on her Mother’s Side and Portuguese and Irish background on her father’s side.
