= Jane Delgado =

American psychologist

Jane L. Delgado
- Born: June 17, 1953 (age 73); Havana, Cuba
- Occupation: Health care leader
- Years active: 1970s until present
- Known for: Advocating for best health for all
- Notable work: The Buena Salud Guide book series

Jane L. Delgado (born June 17, 1953) is a Cuban-American clinical psychologist, health care advocate, non-profit executive, and author. She is president and CEO of the National Alliance for Hispanic Health. She is the author of The Buena Salud Guide book series (Newmarket Press, 2011) and The Latina Guide to Health (Newmarket Press, 2010). In 2012 the series was acquired by William Morrow an Imprint of HarperCollins Publishers and published Buena Salud Guide to Arthritis and Your Life.

== Early life and education ==
Delgado was born in Havana, Cuba and immigrated with her mother, father, and sister to Brooklyn, New York in 1955. In public school, Delgado overcame early difficulties with English to rise to the top of her class, skipped 8th grade, graduated at the end of 11th grade, and enrolled at SUNY New Paltz.

Delgado received a M.A. in psychology from New York University in 1975, a Ph.D. in clinical psychology from SUNY Stony Brook in 1981 and an M.S. in Urban and Policy Sciences from Stony Brook's W. Averell Harriman School of Management and Policy the same year.

== Professional career ==
In the 1970s, Delgado worked for the Children's Television Workshop, first as assistant to the auditor starting in 1973. On the strength of her education in psychology, Delgado was soon promoted to children's talent coordinator on Sesame Street.

In 1979, Delgado joined the Department of Health and Human Services and in 1983 joined the Immediate Office of the Secretary. Delgado eventually became Special Assistant on Minority Affairs, and was a policy staff member on the August 1985 "Report of the Secretary's Task Force on Black and Minority Health".

In 1985 Delgado became president and chief executive of what was called the Coalition of Spanish Speaking Mental Health Organizations, dedicated to improving the health and well-being of Hispanics. She is the first Hispanic woman to serve in this position. Delgado made environmental health a program effort in 1988 and initiated the first technology program for community-based organizations in 1991. The organization has grown to become the National Alliance for Hispanic Health (the Alliance). As CEO of the Alliance Delgado oversees its key components, i.e., the National Office ( with field operations in 25 states, Puerto Rico, and the District of Columbia), the Healthy Americas Foundation, and the Healthy Americas Institute (Located in Keck School of Medicine at USC).

== Service ==
Delgado serves on the board of governors for Argonne National Labs. She also serves on the board of the Lovelace Biomedical Research Institute; McLean Hospital (Belmont, MA); and, the U.S. Soccer Foundation. She served on the board of the Kresge Foundation (16 years) and the Northern Virginia Health Foundation (10 years) for the respective term limits. She was appointed by the DHHS Secretary to the National Biodefense Science Board and was appointed by the Senate majority leader to the Mickey Leland National Urban Air Toxics Research Center (NUATRC) authorized by Congress.

Delgado served on the national advisory council for Mrs. Rosalyn Carter's Task Force on Mental Health and is a member of BankInter's Future Trends Forum in Madrid, Spain. Some recent honors include: 2023 7 Latina Doctors Who Made History and a Difference by HipLATINA, 2021 Contributions to Public Administration Health Policy Leader by National Academy of Public Administration, 2020 American Association of Medical Colleges List of 10 Hispanic Pioneers in Medicine, and in 2019 she was awarded a Doctor of Letters by the Board of Trustees of the State University of New York "the highest form of recognition offered by the State University of New York, honoring exceptional scholarship, service and professional achievements that stand as an example for the many and diverse students attending SUNY institutions." In 2018 Latino Leaders named her to the 101 Most Influential Latinos in the U.S. and in 2017 she received the Aztec Award from the Mexican American Opportunity Foundation. In 2016 Latino Leaders named her to the 101 Most Influential Latinos in the U.S. In 2015 she received the FDA Commissioner's Special Citation the Dr. Harvey Wiley Award (highest award to a civilian) In 2010, Ladies Home Journal named Delgado one of its "Ladies We Love." In 2008 Delgado was honored as one of the Health Heroes for 2008 by WebMD Magazine. and In 2007 was listed among the 100 most influential Hispanics by People En Español. In 2000, Ladies Home Journal named Delgado one of seven "Women to Watch," among other "unsung heroines who are forging ahead to improve our health. Delgado was honored in 2005 by the Hispanic Heritage Foundation with their Award for Education, recognizing her contributions to innovation in the use of technology in health care. In 1998 and 2002 she was named by Hispanic Business one of the 100 most influential Hispanics in the U.S.,

== Published works ==
Delgado has written numerous books in the health and wellness category. She is the author of ¡SALUD! A Latina's Guide to Total Health, first published by Rayo/HarperCollins in 1997. A revised edition was named one of the Best Health Books for 2002 by Library Journal.

She is the author of The Latina Guide to Health (Newmarket Press, 2010).

She is the author of The Buena Salud Guide book series (Newmarket Press, 2011 which is now William Morrow an Imprint of HarperCollins Publishers). The first two books in the series, The Buena Salud Guide for a Healthy Heart and The Buena Salud Guide to Diabetes and Your Life, were published in March 2011 and received critical acclaim from Library Journal. The third book in the series, The Buena Salud Guide to Overcoming Depression and Enjoying Life, was published in November 2011 and in 2012 "The Buena Salud Guide to Arthritis and Your Life" was published "according to the publisher's website. The Buena Salud Guide for a Healthy Heart was named one of the best health books in 2011 by the Library Journal. The most recent books in the Buena Salud series are "The New No Gimmick Diet—the Buena Salud Guide to Losing Weight and Keeping It Off" (2017) and a new edition of The Buena Salud Guide to Overcoming Depression and Enjoying Life (2020) both published by Buena Salud Press (available in English and Spanish).

Delgado's recent articles include "To advance science we need to address ‘otherness.” Nature Human Behaviour. February 2, 2024 and “Beyond Diversity—Time for New Models of Health,” in the New England Journal of Medicine, 386;6, February 10, 2022, Pgs. 503-505

== Personal ==
Delgado lives in Washington, D.C., with her husband Mark.
