= Planetary Instrument for X-Ray Lithochemistry =

X-ray fluorescence spectrometer to determine the elemental composition of Martian soil

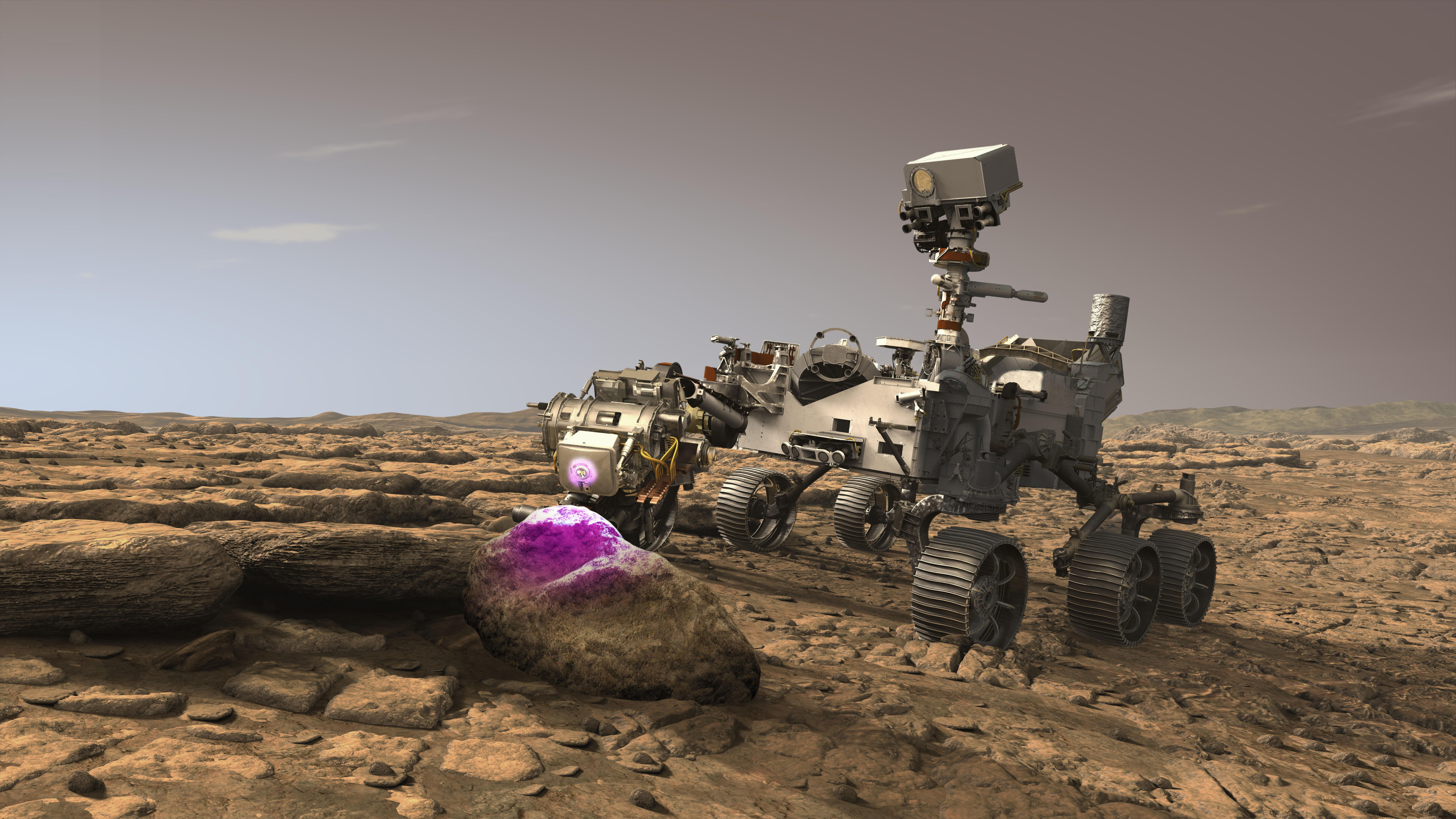
Mars Perseverance rover - PIXL studies a rock (artist concept)

Planetary Instrument for X-Ray Lithochemistry (PIXL) is an X-ray fluorescence spectrometer to determine the fine scale elemental composition of Martian surface materials designed for the Perseverance rover as part of the Mars 2020 mission.

PIXL is manufactured and made by NASA Jet Propulsion Laboratory.

== Science objectives ==
The scientific objectives of the instrument are the following:

1. Provide detailed geochemical assessment of past environments, habitability, and biosignature preservation potential.
2. Detect any potential chemical biosignatures that are encountered and characterize the geochemistry of any other types of potential biosignatures detected.
3. Provide a detailed geochemical basis for selection of a compelling set of samples for return to Earth.

== Gallery ==
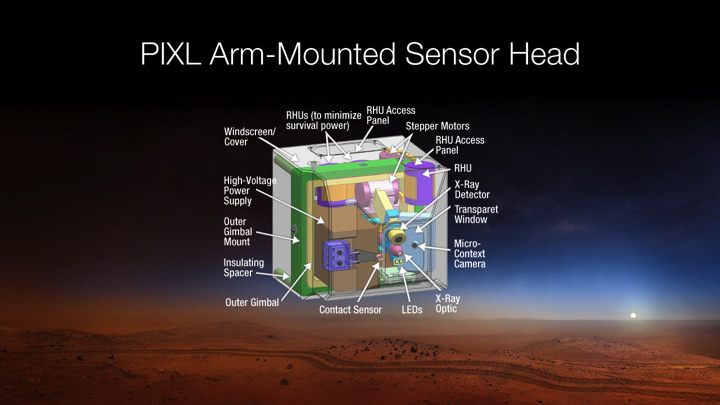
Perseverance rover - PIXL (31 July 2014).

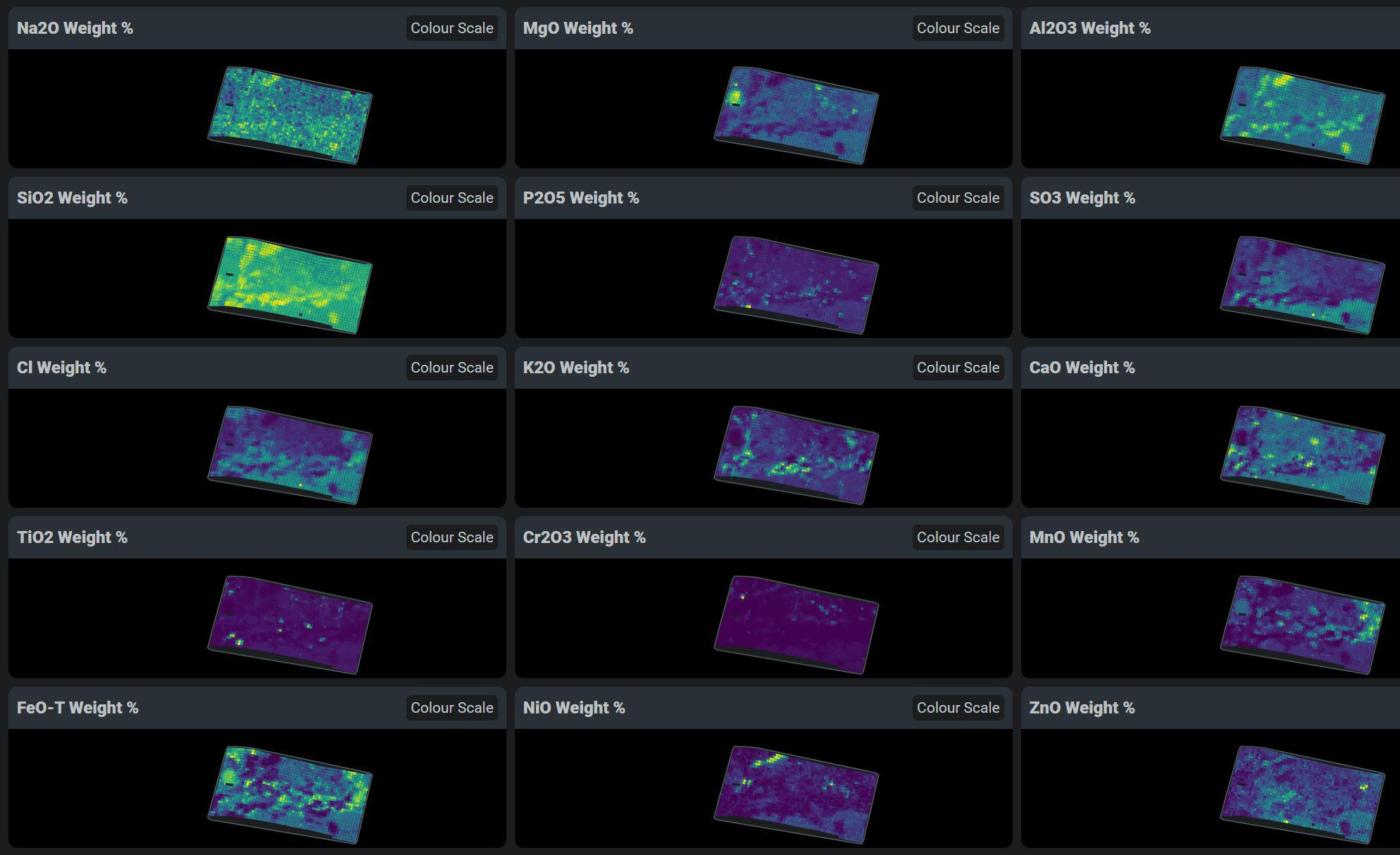
PIXL − first chemical maps of a single rock on Mars (20 July 2021)

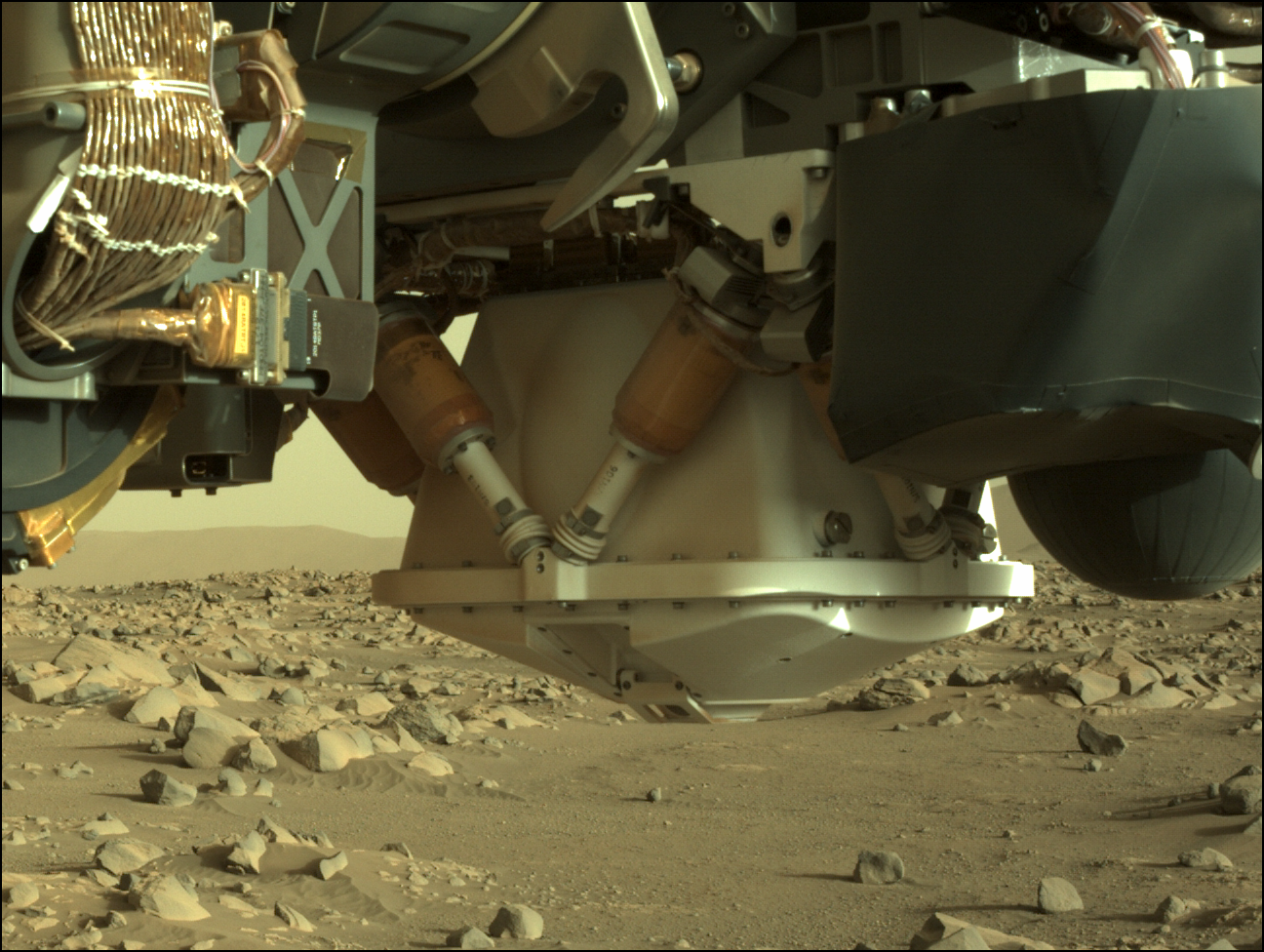
PIXL imaged on Mars by the rover's navigation camera.

Perseverance analyzes Rochette rock (August 2021)

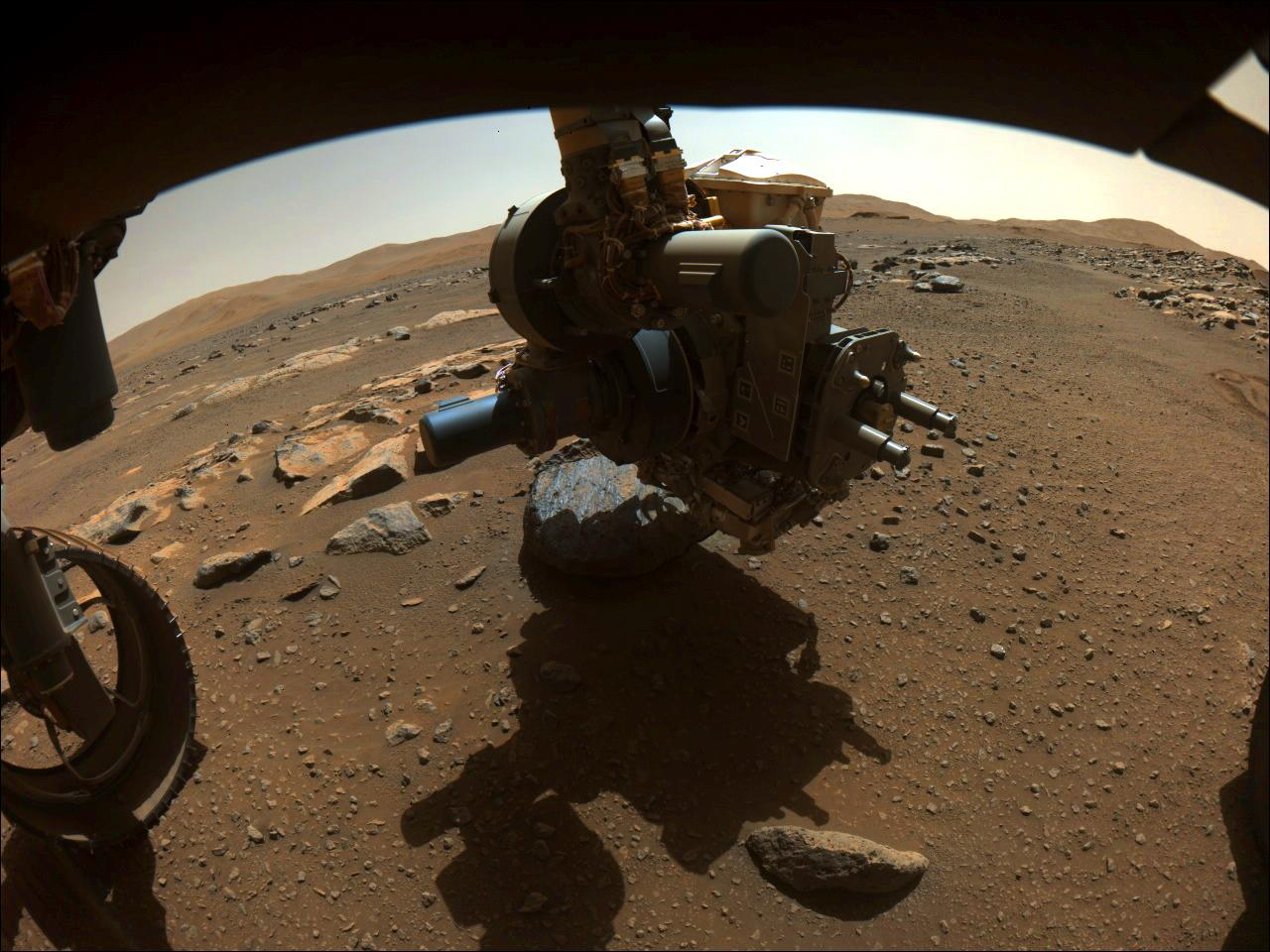
Rover studies rock

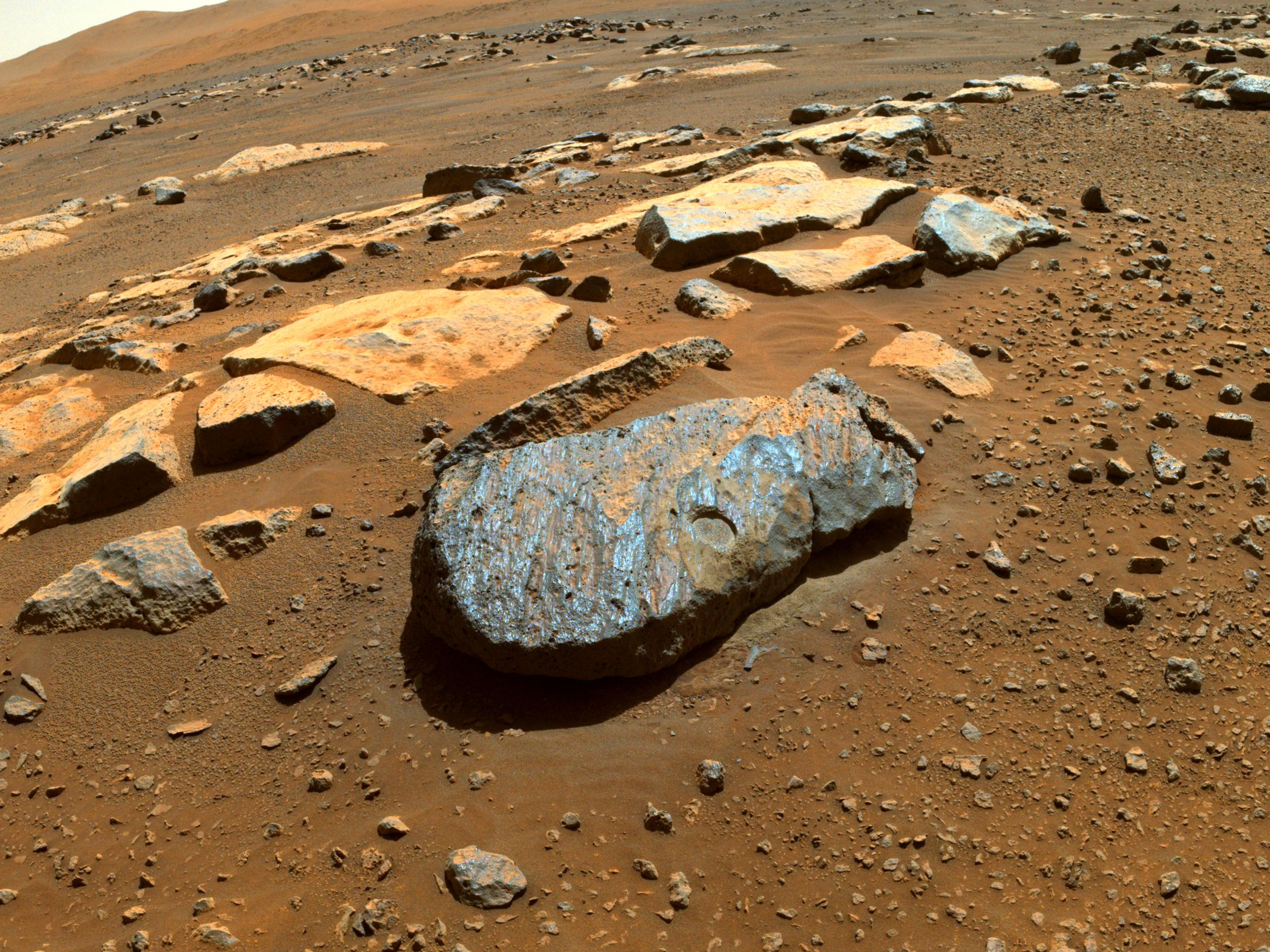
After abrading rock

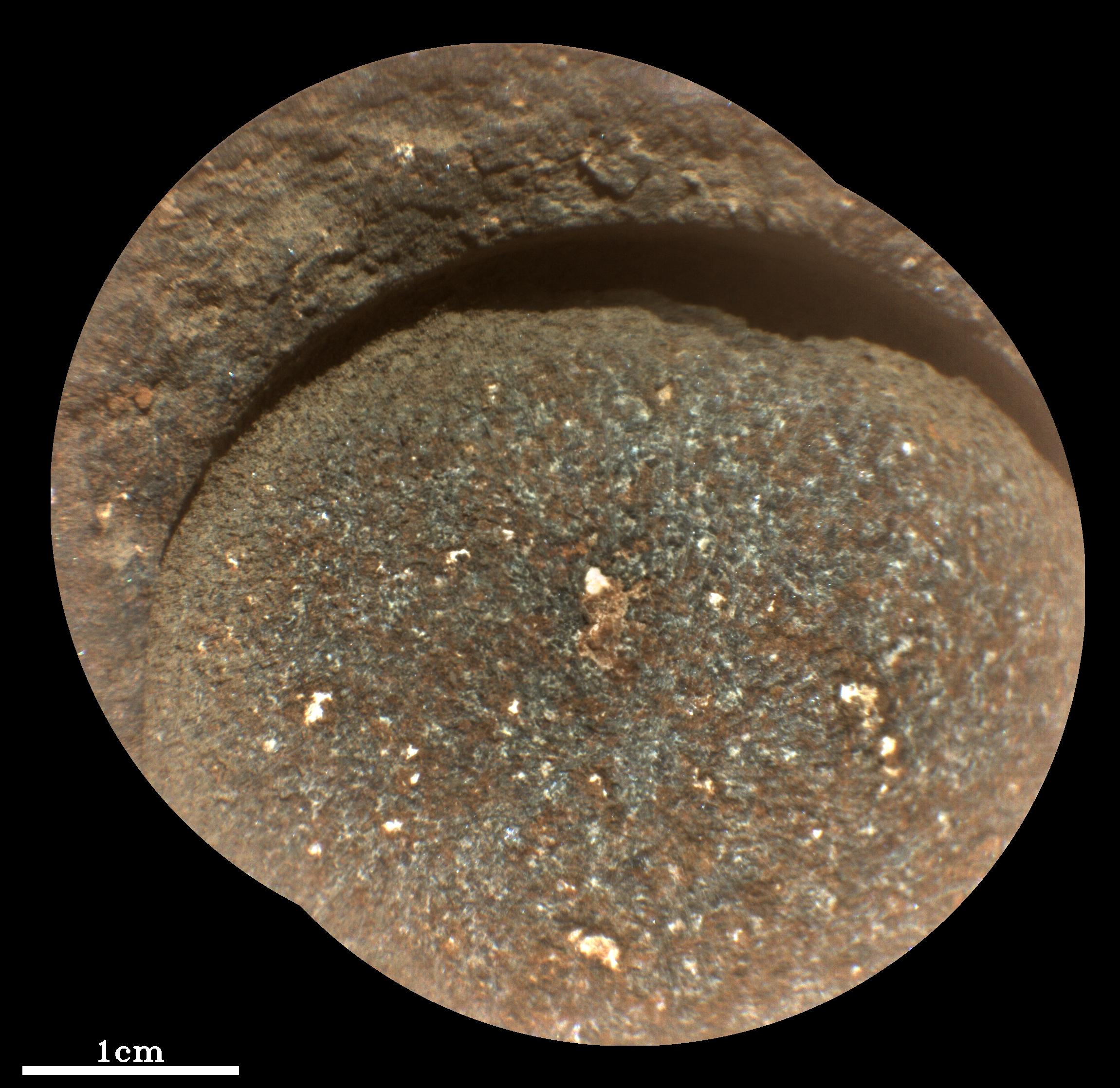
Bellegarde patch

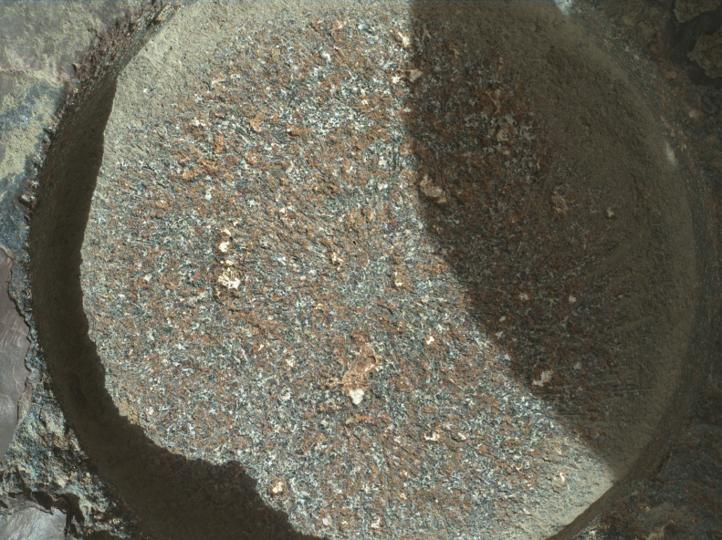
WATSON view

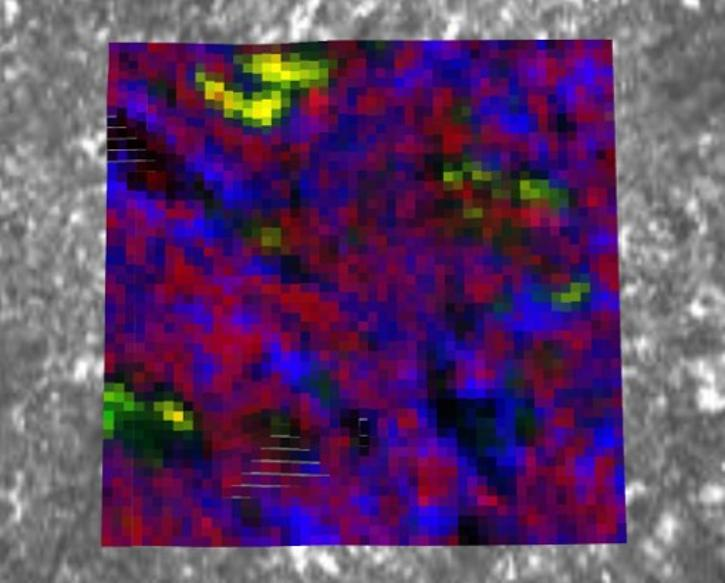
PIXL view

Planetary Instrument for X-Ray Lithochemistry (PIXL)

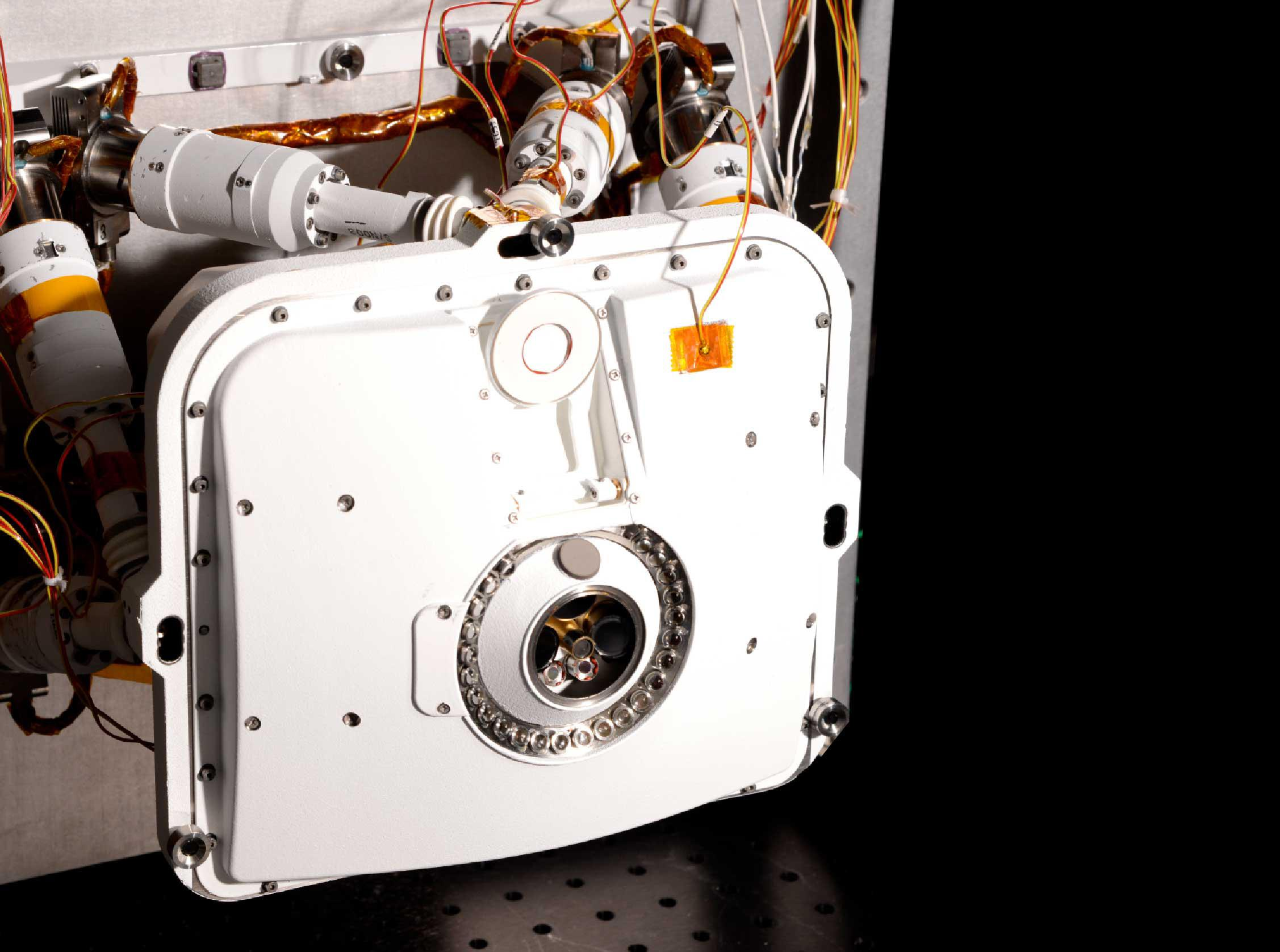
Uncovered

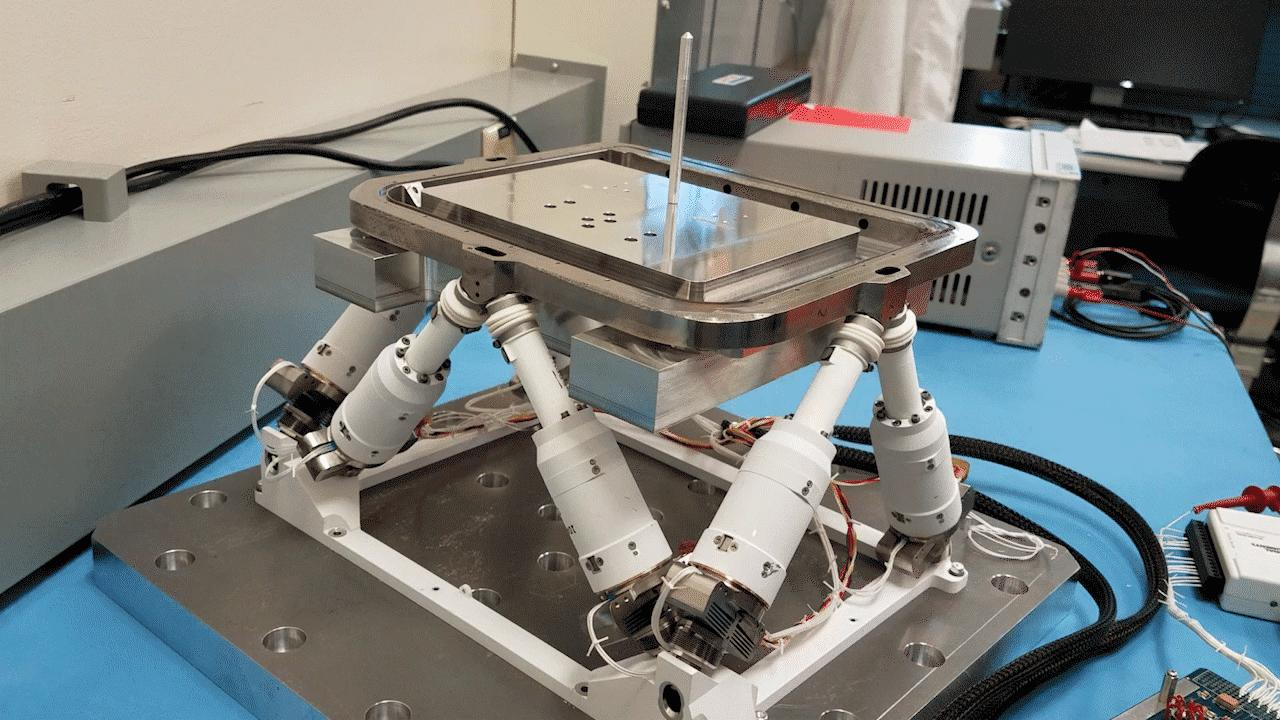
Hexapod

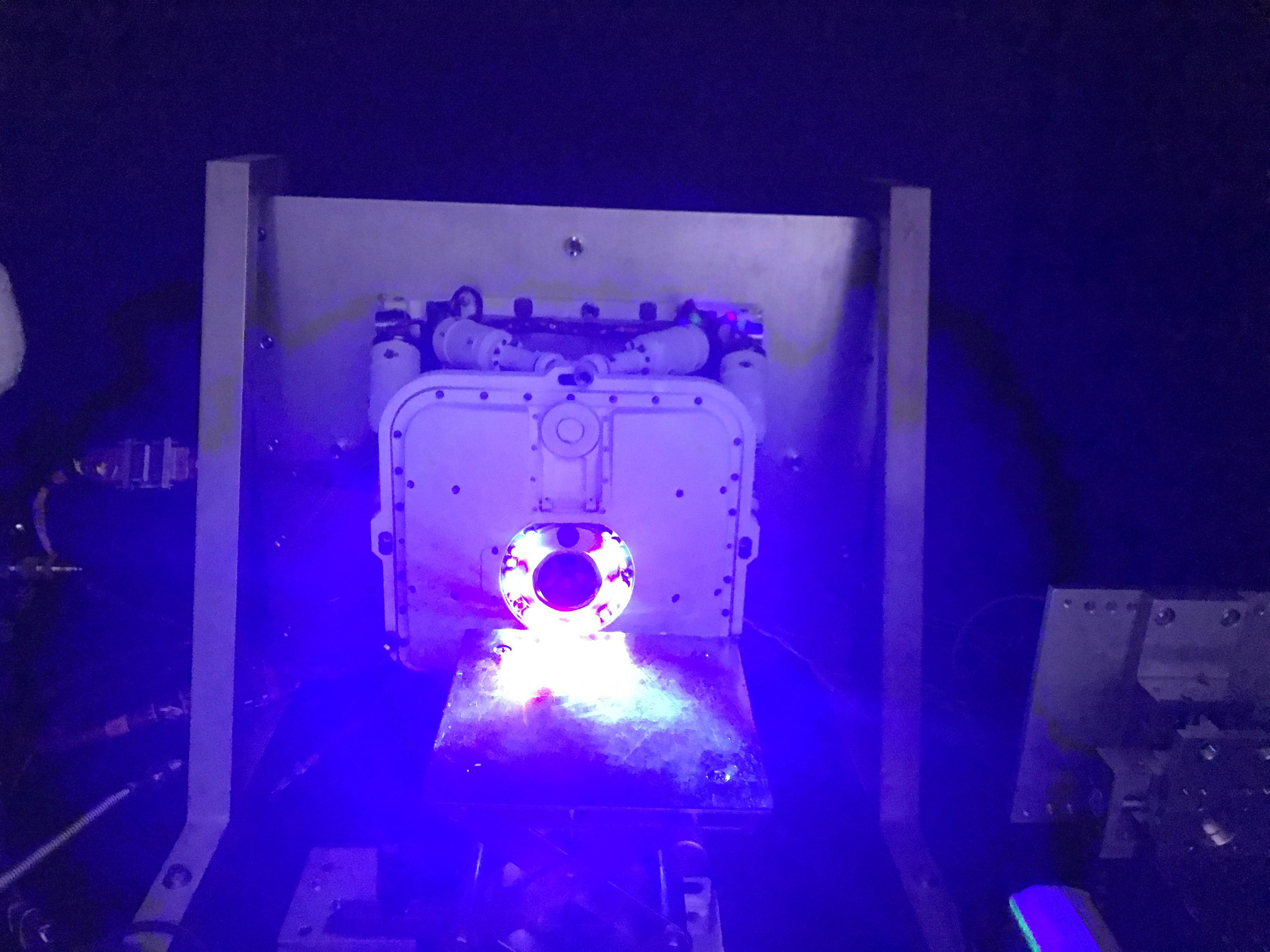
Nightlight

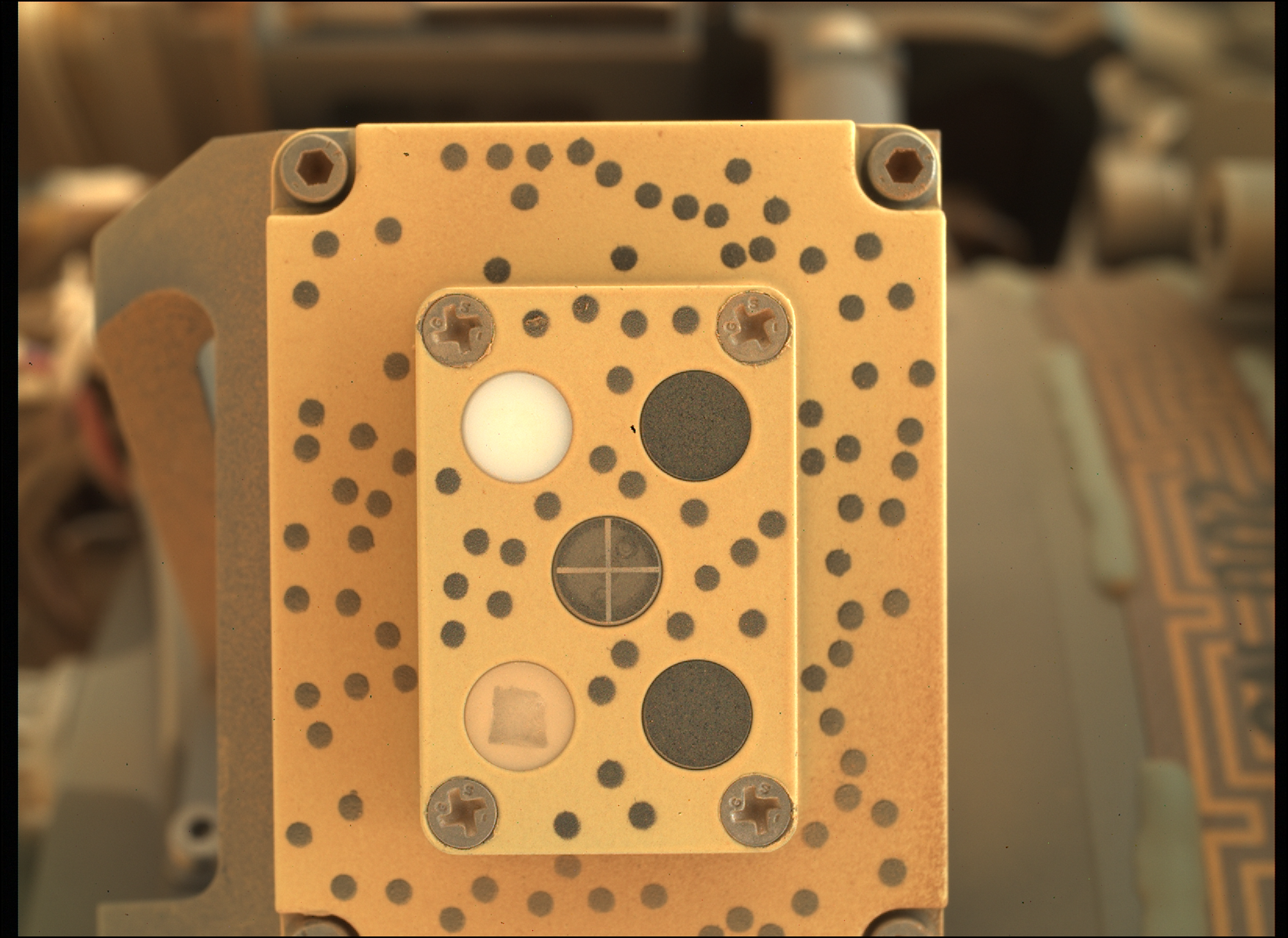
Calibration

X-ray fluorescence spectrometer developed for the Perseverance rover to analyze the chemistry of surface materials.

== See also ==
- Composition of Mars
- Curiosity rover
- Exploration of Mars
- Geology of Mars
- List of rocks on Mars
- Mars Science Laboratory
- MOXIE
- Scientific information from the Mars Exploration Rover mission
- SHERLOC
- Timeline of Mars Science Laboratory
