= Jeremiah Abraham =

Filipino-American film producer

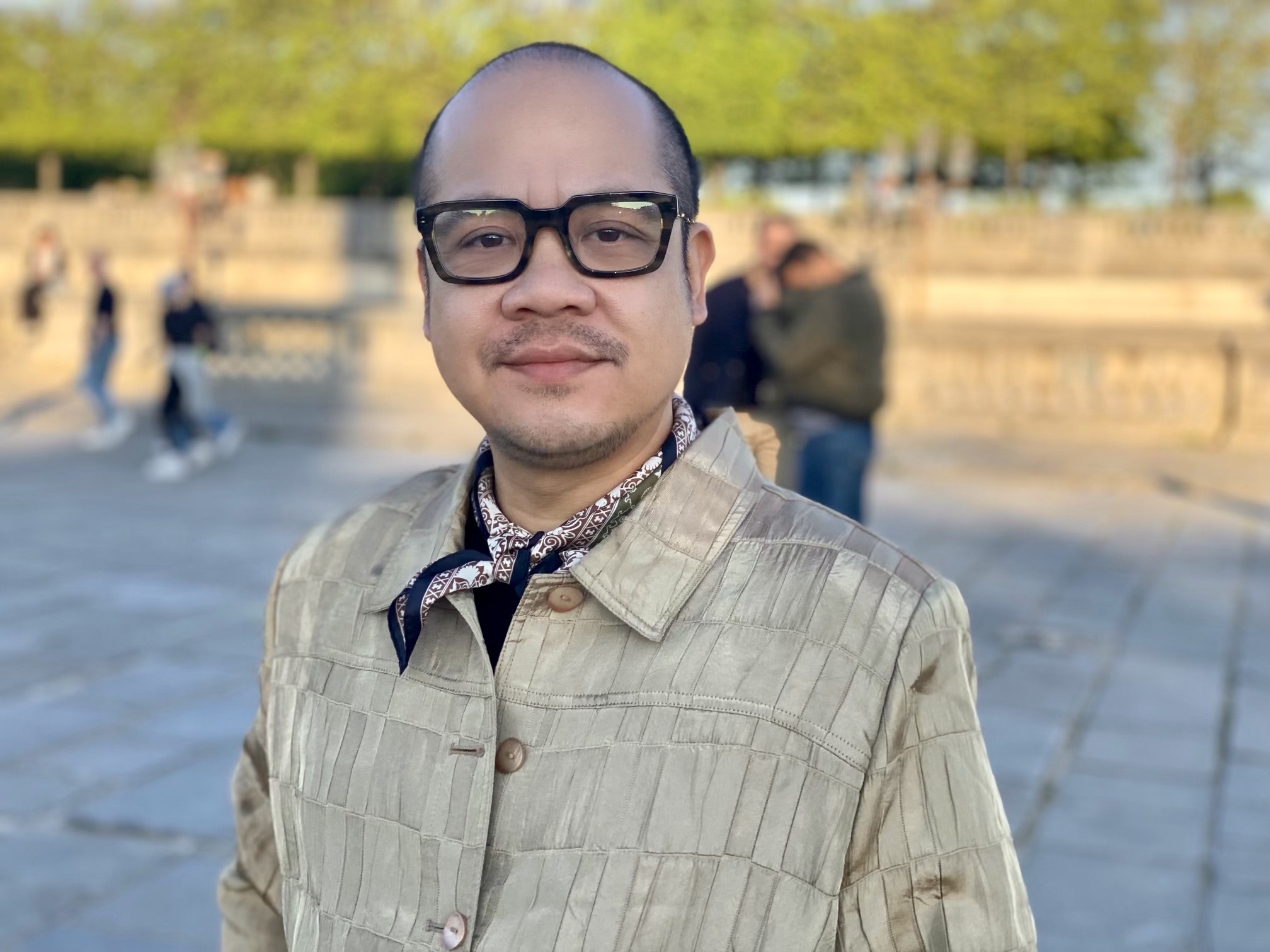
- Jeremiah Abraham in 2022

Jeremiah Abraham is a Filipino-American film producer, Broadway producer, and marketing executive.

Abraham is a co-producer for Sony's Yellow Rose and Lingua Franca, which were distributed by Ava DuVernay's Array Now.

In 2022, it was announced that Abraham would produce the series Conception for ABS-CBN.

Abraham is a co-producer on the Broadway show Here Lies Love.
