= Miguel San Martín =

Argentine engineer and science educator

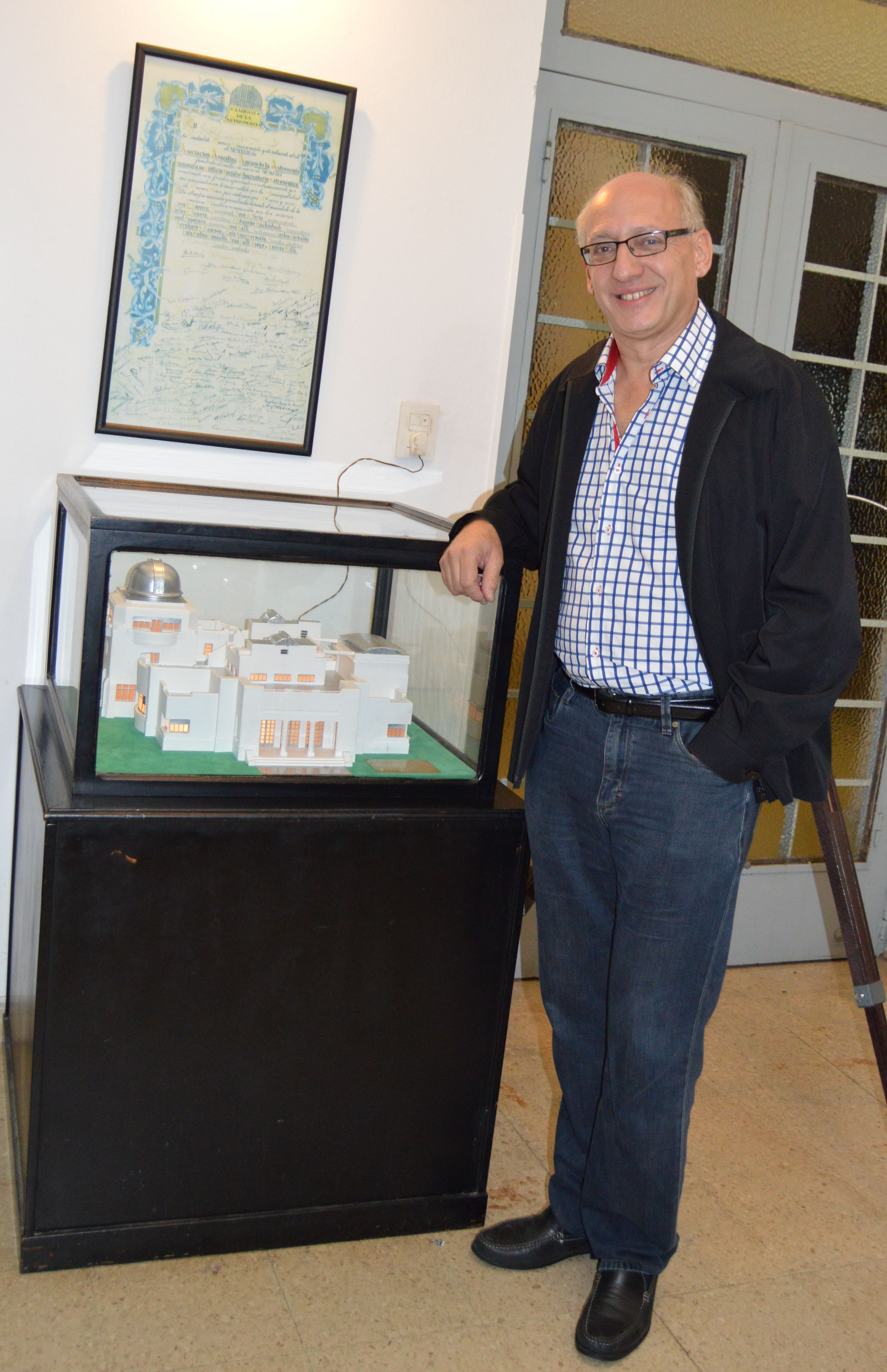
- Miguel San Martín after a conference in the Asociación Argentina "Amigos de la Astronomía".
- Born: Alejandro Miguel San Martín; January 6, 1959 (age 67); Villa Regina, Río Negro, Argentina
- Education: Syracuse University; MIT
- Known for: Coinventor of the Sky Crane system
- Spouse: Susan
- Children: Samantha and Madeleine
- Awards: Premio Konex: Diploma al Mérito en Desarrollo Tecnológico, NASA Exceptional Engineering Achievement Medal - NASA, Premio Konex de Platino, Magellan Award for Outstanding Senior JPL Management, Best Paper Award -- 23rd AAS/AIAA Space Flight Mechanics Conference
- Scientific career
- Fields: Engineer
- Workplaces: NASA; JPL

Alejandro Miguel San Martín (January 6, 1959) is an Argentine engineer of NASA and a science educator. He is best known for his work as Chief Engineer for the Guidance, Navigation, and Control system in the latest missions to Mars. His best known contribution is the Sky Crane system, of which he is coinventor, used in the Curiosity mission for the descent of the rover.

In addition to his work as an engineer, he is dedicated to giving presentations about the work he does with his team at NASA. He has participated as a speaker at various events such as Campus Party, Robotics Day, Real Talks Atlanta and TEDx Río de la Plata, among other conferences. He is featured in the NASA video "Curiosity's Seven Minutes of Terror" along with other Curiosity engineers.

== Early life and career ==
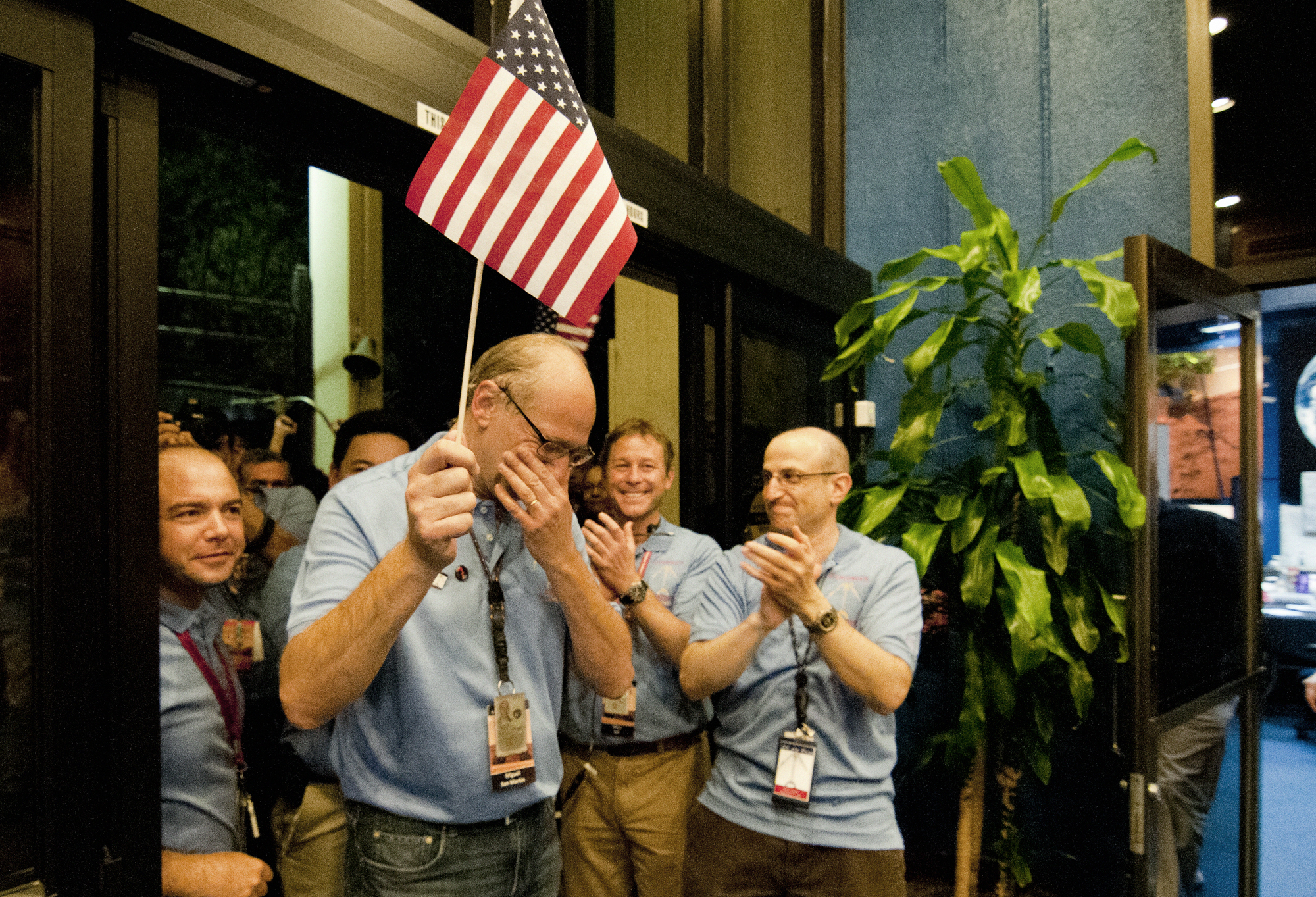
Miguel San Martín pauses to hold back tears as he leads the Entry, Descent and Landing team into the post-landing news briefing.

He left Argentina after he graduated from industrial school, moving to the United States to get a bachelor's degree in electrical engineering from Syracuse University College of Engineering and Computer Science, being named Engineering Student of the Year. He completed his master's degree at the Massachusetts Institute of Technology.

In various interviews he said that he decided to be a space engineer on a winter's night in 1976 at his parents’ farm, while he listened to the BBC on short wave reporting the arrival of the Viking mission to Mars.

He started working for the NASA Jet Propulsion Laboratory in 1985, where he participated in the Magellan mission to Venus and Cassini mission to Saturn. Later in the Pathfinder mission he was named Chief Engineer for the Guidance, Navigation, and Control system, which landed Sojourner rover. In the same role he was part of the Spirit and Opportunity missions in 2004. He helped to develop the Sky Crane system which landed Curiosity on Mars as part of the Mars Science Laboratory mission, and with his team at JPL he also worked on the software for the landing.

He is a member of the NASA National Engineering and Safety Center.

In February 2019, he was elected as member of the National Academy of Engineering.

== Awards ==
- 1998, 2013: NASA Exceptional Engineering Achievement Medal
- 2004: NASA Exceptional Service Medal
- 2007: NASA Group Achievement Award
- 2013: Outstanding Engineering Achievement Merit Award - The Engineers' Council
- 2013: Collier Trophy for the Curiosity Team - National Aeronautic Association
- 2013: National Air and Space Museum Trophy for Current Achievement - Smithsonian Institution
- 2013: Premio Konex: Diploma al Mérito en Desarrollo Tecnológico - La Fundación Konex
- 2013: Premio Konex de Platino: Desarrollo Tecnológico - La Fundación Konex
- 2013: Magellan Award for Outstanding Senior JPL Management - The Jet Propulsion Laboratory
- 2013: NASA Group Achievement Award: MSL Guidance, Navigation, and Control System Team
- 2013: NASA Group Achievement Award: MSL Entry, Descent, and Landing Team
- 2013: NASA Group Achievement Award: MSL Project Operations Team
- 2013: JPL Fellow - The Jet Propulsion Laboratory
- 2013: Best Paper Award: 23rd AAS/AIAA Space Flight Mechanics Conference - AAS/AIAA
- 2019: He was elected a member of the National Academy of Engineering for technical contributions and leadership in guidance, navigation, and control leading to successful Mars entry, descent, and landing.

== See also ==
- Adam Steltzner, lead engineer of the Mars Science Laboratory Curiosity rover Entry, Descent and Landing phase
