= Christina Hernández =

American systems engineer

Christina Hernández is a Mexican-American systems engineer at NASA. She worked on the Mars Perseverance Rover and was a micrometeoroid and orbital debris specialist at the Jet Propulsion Laboratory. Her contribution to aerospace involved adding safety within spacecraft. An advocate for Latinas in STEM, Hernandez was a recipient of the Hispanic Heritage Foundation awards in 2021.

== Early life and background ==
Her family is from the Mexicali area, and her grandparents came from Guadalajara, Mexico. Her birthday is on March 10. She grew up in Los Angeles, California. She continues to reside in California. Hernández was always interested in anything space-related and even did her own research about space from a young age. Her interest on the subject of aerospace was first introduced when she was at a local library looking at information on the planet Saturn.

Hernández has been working as an aerospace engineer for NASA ever since she was 22 years old. She told We Are Mitú how she suffered from imposter syndrome when she worked with NASA. During aerospace engineering she had a difficult time adjusting to being underrepresented. Prior to 2021, Hernandez had worked as a payload systems engineer for about six years.

== Education ==
Hernández attended California Academy of Mathematics and Science in Carson, California, where she participated in the STEM program and joined the robotics team. She also participated in an aerospace and defense technology-based internship. Hernández was a member of the Society of Hispanic Professional Engineers and the Multicultural Engineering Program at San Luis Obispo. Hernández received her master's degree in aerospace engineering at California Polytechnic State University, San Luis Obispo. Her master's thesis was titled: A Study of the Collisional Evolution of Orbital Debris in Geopotential Wells and GEO Disposal Orbits.

== Career and awards ==
Hernández is the Head of Systems Engineering Operations at Matter.com in San Diego, CA. Her former work was at NASA as a Systems Engineer in their Jet Propulsion Laboratory in Pasadena, California. When first starting out with NASA, she was part of their Natural Space Environments group. Hernández also worked with STABLE which is the Subarcsecond Telescope and BaLloon Experiment as a mission assurance manager. She then joined the Mars team after her work with STABLE, working on the Mars Perseverance Rover's payload development and delivery team. Her work will help scientists find signs of ancient microbial life through taking close-up images of rock and soil textures. She is on the team of system engineers developing and testing the newest rover for their Mars exploration. Hernández has also worked on three of the seven science instruments, which are MEDA (weather station), RIMFAX (radar), and PIXL (spectrometer), where she was able to get them through different phases of development and testing.

Additionally, Hernandez wrote an article for the New York Times where she reflects on a series, called Turning Points. In her reflection, she shared her intel on how a scientific gadget that was named Perseverance landed on Mars on February 18, 2021.

Her work on the Perseverance led to her winning the Hispanic Heritage STEM Award on October 8, 2021.

== Contributions ==
Hernández's work included ensuring the safety of spacecraft in relation to orbital debris and other obstacles, such as radiation, through many analyses and assessments. During Hernández's time with STABLE, she completed a project called Comet Sliding Spring which led Mars Reconnaissance Orbiter, Odyssey, and MAVEN safely in the comet event. This led Hernández to work with the Mars team for their mission. Hernández's contribution consisted of ensuring that instruments used by NASA were being built safely and tested them to see if they performed properly when taken out on Mars.
