= Virgilio Elizondo =

Mexican-American Catholic priest (1935–2016)

Virgilio P. Elizondo (August 28, 1935 – March 14, 2016) was a Mexican-American Catholic priest and community activist, who was also a leading scholar of liberation theology and Hispanic theology. He was widely regarded as "the father of U.S. Latino religious thought."

Elizondo was the founder of the Pastoral Institute at the University of the Incarnate Word. He was also a co-founder of the Mexican-American Cultural Center, a think tank for scholars and religious leaders to develop pastoral ministry and theology from a Hispanic perspective. (It has since become the Mexican American Catholic College.) Elizondo was also well known for his book, Galilean Journey: The Mexican-American Promise, which examined the similarities between Jesus' Galilean background and the mestizo experience.

== Life ==
=== Early life ===
Elizondo was born in San Antonio, Texas, in 1935 to Mexican immigrants who ran a grocery store. His older sister is San Antonio-based artist Anita Valencia. He grew up in a society where the Mexican-American community was barred from many segments of the city and speaking Spanish was not welcome. Never hearing English spoken, he himself was unable to speak it fluently until he had reached the sixth grade.

After completing Peacock Military Academy, Elizondo enrolled at St. Mary's University in San Antonio, where he majored in chemistry, earning a Bachelor of Science degree. Though he had considered a career in medicine, he felt called to serve in the ministry and enrolled in Assumption Seminary in San Antonio, so that he could stay close to his home.

=== Priest and activist ===
Elizondo was ordained as a priest of the Archdiocese of San Antonio in 1963 by Robert E. Lucey, its archbishop. He spent the next two years serving in parishes of the archdiocese before he was appointed the Director of Religious Education for the archdiocese, which turned his career to a more academic focus. Lucey relied on him as a liaison to the Mexican-American population and brought Elizondo with him as a translator and advisor to the Conference of Latin American Bishops held in 1968 in Medellín, Colombia, which advanced a progressive agenda for the Catholic Church in the Americas.

After this experience, Elizondo returned to San Antonio and soon began to organize the Hispanic population to work to protect its rights. He was the founder and first director of the Pastoral Institute at the University of the Incarnate Word in San Antonio. In an effort to help the American Catholic clergy connect with the Hispanic population, he joined with Patrick Flores, an auxiliary bishop of the archdiocese, in founding the Mexican-American Cultural Center (now the Mexican American Catholic College) in 1972. It provided programs to teach religious leaders to think and serve from a Hispanic perspective, that they might better serve their growing congregations of Hispanic Catholics.

Elizondo moved to Paris, France, soon after this, where he enrolled at the Institut Catholique de Paris, a leading faculty in catechetical studies in 1978, earning there the degrees of both a Doctor of Philosophy and a Doctor of Sacred Theology.

In the late 1980s, Flores, by then the Archbishop of San Antonio, appointed Elizondo as the pastor of the Cathedral of San Fernando. He introduced a Spanish-language Mass there which was broadcast to a million homes.

=== Death ===
Elizondo's body was found at his home on March 14, 2016. He had died from gunshot wounds to the head. He was removed from public ministry by his local ordinary because of an allegation of sexual abuse of a minor, allegedly committed in 1983. The abuse allegation was made by a man who says he was molested by Jesus Armando Dominguez from 1980 to 1983 while he lived in an orphanage. Dominguez was then a seminarian. The man claims he told Father Elizondo about the abuse and that the priest then molested him in turn. Father Elizondo vigorously denied it. The criminal and civil cases dealing with these child abuse allegations were long delayed and the pending trial date was said to have made him despondent. Elizondo maintained his innocence and the full details of the allegations and any supporting evidence were never made public. Elizondo was never convicted or found responsible. The Medical Examiner of Bexar County, Texas, soon ruled his death a suicide. Elizondo was given a full Catholic funeral rite and burial honoring his service to the Catholic Church and the world.

== Theology ==
Much of Elizondo's theology focuses on the theological significance of the mestizo/a and the process of mestizaje, which he defines as a mixing of two or more groups of people, biologically, culturally, and/or religiously. He is most interested in the position of Mexican-Americans, whom he regards as the product of a double process of mestizaje, the first being the biological, cultural, and religious mixing that created the Mexican people and the second being the primarily cultural mixing between Mexicans and Anglos in the U.S. Southwest.

This second mixing occurred originally through American expansion and conquest of formerly Mexican territory and has continued through Mexican immigration to the United States. Elizondo believes that the position of the mestizo/a puts him/her in a unique position as both insider and outsider. From this unique position, the mestizo/a has the potential to help bring about a new, united humanity. Elizondo writes, "With each new mestizaje, some racio-cultural frontiers that divide humankind are razed and a new unity is formed."

Elizondo was also interested in the Virgin of Guadalupe as symbol of the Mexican people and therefore as a product of the process of mestizaje.

== Honors ==
Elizondo was designated as the co-recipient of the 2007 Community of Christ International Peace Award, along with Dolores Huerta. In 1997, he was awarded the Laetare Medal, the University of Notre Dame's highest honor.

In 2000, Time named him one of the most innovative spiritual leaders in the United States.

== Works ==
- La Morenita: Evangelizer of the Americas (1981)
- Galilean Journey: The Mexican-American Promise (1983)
- Virgin and Mother: Biblical Reflections on Mary of Nazareth (1983)
- Christianity and Culture: An Introduction to Pastoral Theology and Ministry for the Bi-cultural Community
- The Future is Mestizo: Life Where Cultures Meet (1988)
- 'Mestizaje as a Locus of Theological Reflection' in Frontiers of Hispanic Theology in the United States, Allan Figueroa Deck, S.J., ed. (1992)
- Our Lady of Guadalupe: Faith and Empowerment among Mexican-American Women by Jeanette Rodriguez, foreword by Virgilio Elizondo (1994)
- Guadalupe: Mother of the New Creation (1997)
- San Fernando Cathedral: Soul of the City (with Timothy M. Matovina) (1998)
- A Retreat With Our Lady of Guadalupe and Juan Diego: Heeding the Call (1998)
- Mestizo Worship: A Pastoral Approach to Liturgical Ministry (with Timothy M. Matovina) (1998)
- Beyond Borders: Writings of Virgilio Elizondo and Friends (with Gustavo Gutierrez), Timothy Matovina, ed. (2000)
- Mestizo Democracy: The Politics of Crossing Borders by John Francis Burke, foreword by Virgilio Elizondo (2002)
- A God of Incredible Surprises: Jesus of Galilee (2003)
- Charity (2008)
- Virgilio Elizondo: Spiritual Writings (2010)
