= Pedro José Greer =

American physician

Pedro José Greer Jr.
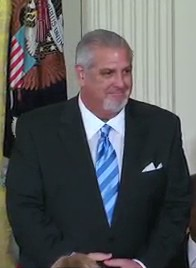
- Greer in August 2009
- Born: June 15, 1956 (age 70); Miami, Florida
- Education: University of Florida (BS, MD)
- Occupation: Academic Administrator

Pedro José Greer Jr. (born June 15, 1956, in Miami, Florida) is an American physician of Cuban descent. He is Founding Dean for the Roseman University Health Sciences College of Medicine. He was awarded a MacArthur "genius grant" in 1993, the Presidential Medal of Freedom in 2009, and the Great Floridian Award in 2013. He has been a board member of the American charity for the homeless, Comic Relief.

== Early life and career ==
Born to parents who emigrated from Cuba, Greer graduated from Christopher Columbus High School, and then from the University of Florida with a BS in chemistry in 1978. In 1984, he earned his MD from the Pontificia Universidad Católica Madre y Maestra. He specialized in gastroenterology and hepatology during his residency at Jackson Memorial Hospital. His 1999 autobiography is Waking Up in America: How One Doctor Brings Hope to Those Who Need It Most. He has a joint practice with his father, Dr. Pedro Greer Sr.

He is a member of the Sigma Chi Fraternity and has been awarded the Order of Constantine and Significant Sig awards from that organization.
