= Air Squared =

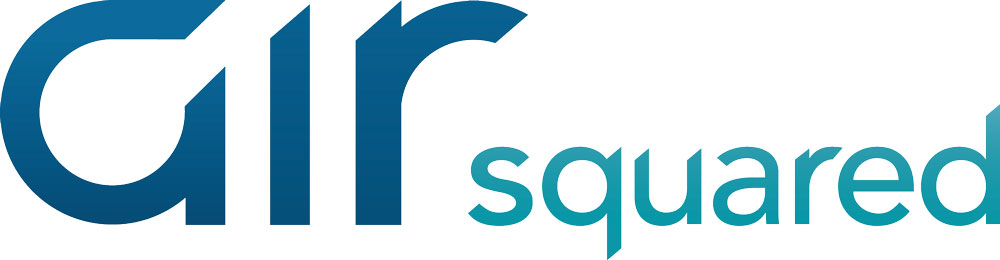
- Type: S corporation
- Industry: Electric Vehicles; Medical; Aerospace; Fuel Cells; Tritium Handling
- Founded: September 1, 1991; 35 years ago in Cincinnati, Ohio
- Founder: Robert Shaffer
- Headquarters: Thornton, Colorado
- Area served: Worldwide
- Products: Scroll Compressors; Scroll Vacuum Pumps; Scroll Expanders
- Production output: 20,000 scroll machines (2020)
- Number of employees: 120 (2022)
- Website: https://airsquared.com

Air Squared is a vertically integrated research and development (R&D) original equipment manufacturing (OEM) firm headquartered in Thornton, Colorado. Its operations include the design, fabrication, and production of oil-free scroll compressors, vacuum pumps, and expanders. Organized in two divisions, Air Squared Manufacturing handles volume assembly and production whereas Air Squared Inc. handles research and development.

== History ==
In 1991, Robert Shaffer founded Air Squared Inc. in Cincinnati, Ohio to license oil-free scroll compressors for medical device applications. Air Squared's first patent was awarded in 1997 titled Scroll compressor having a tip seal. In 2001, Air Squared Manufacturing Inc. was formed in Broomfield, Colorado. Operations were consolidated when both entities merged to form Air Squared Group Inc. in 2016. In 2022, all operations were relocated to Thornton, Colorado.

== Products & Research ==
=== Compressors ===
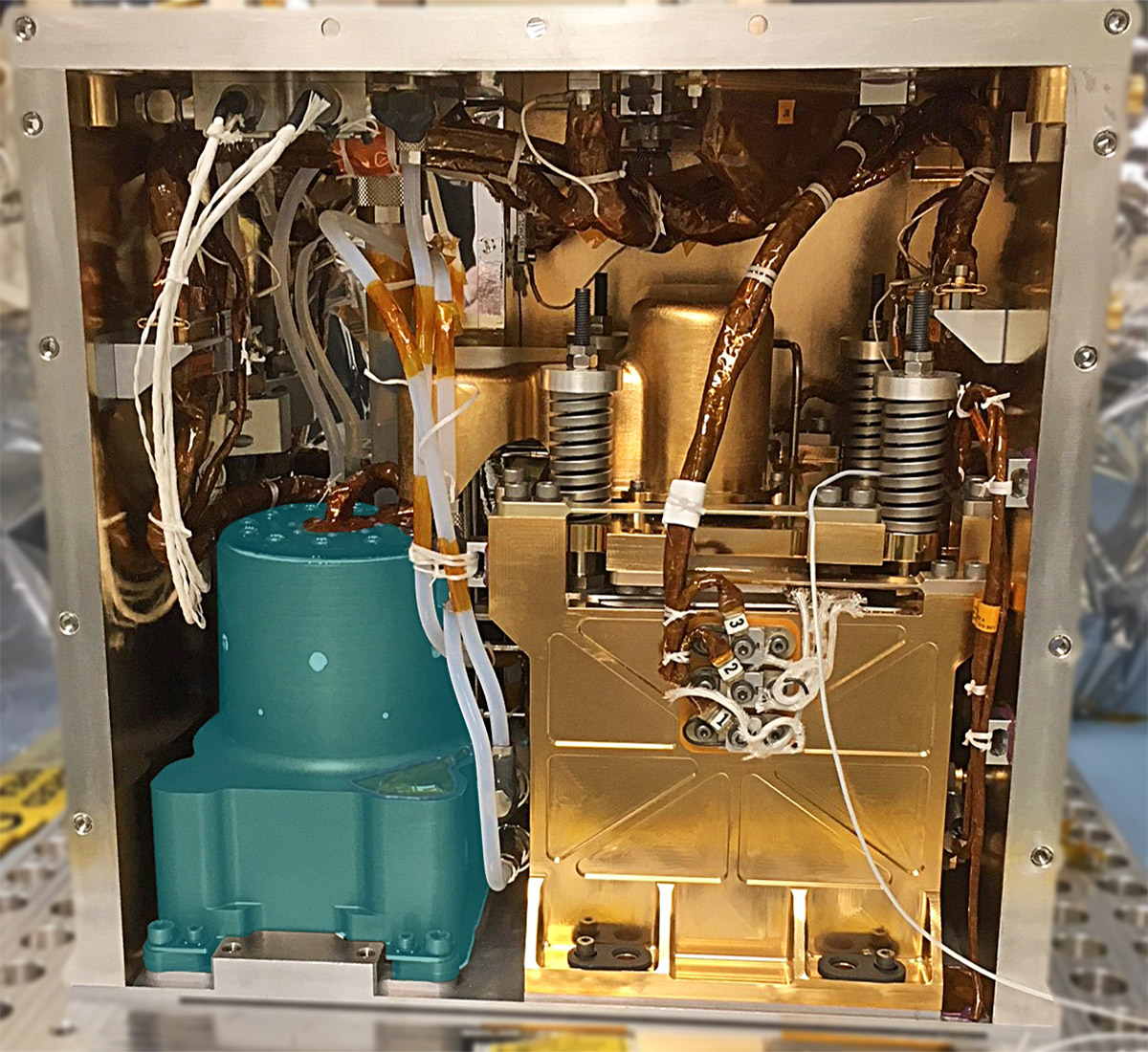
The Mars Oxygen ISRU Experiment (MOXIE) with its scroll compressor highlighted in teal

- Carbon dioxide (CO_{2}) compressor for the Mars Oxygen ISRU Experiment (MOXIE).
- Liquid-cooled air braking compressor for heavy-duty electric vehicles.
- Fuel cell forklift air compressor.
- Oil-free bedside medical device air compressors.
- Zero-gravity vapor compression refrigeration compressor system (VCRS).

=== Vacuum Pumps ===
- All-metal Tokamak reactor tritium roughing vacuum pump.
- Environmental Control and Life Support System (ECLSS) vacuum pump.

=== Expanders ===
- Organic Rankie cycle (ORC) waste heat recovery generator set expander and pump.
- Integrated natural gas, fuel cell, and waste heat recovery generator set expander.
