= Henning Sirringhaus =

- Education: ETH Zürich
- Known for: Plastic Logic Ltd.; Ballistic electron emission microscopy
- Awards: Mullard Award (2003); FRS (2009); Hughes Medal (2013); Faraday Medal (2015)
- Scientific career
- Fields: Microelectronics; Optoelectronics
- Workplaces: University of Cambridge; Cavendish Laboratory; Princeton University
- Thesis: Ballistic-electron-emission microscopy on epitaxial CoSi₂ / Si interfaces (1995)
- Doctoral students: Jana Zaumseil
- Website: oe.phy.cam.ac.uk/fet/people/hs220; www.phy.cam.ac.uk/directory/sirringhaush

Henning Sirringhaus FRS is Hitachi Professor of Electron Device Physics, Head of the Microelectronics Group and a member of the Optoelectronics Group at the Cavendish Laboratory. He is also a Fellow of Churchill College at the University of Cambridge.

== Education ==
Sirringhaus was educated at ETH Zürich where he was awarded a Bachelor of Science degree and PhD in physics. From 1995 to 1996 he worked as a postdoctoral research fellow at Princeton University.

== Research ==
Sirringhaus does research on the charge and spin transport and photophysics of organic semiconductors as well as solution-processible inorganic semiconductors including halide perovskites. Sirringhaus leads an active research group with over 30 members including PhD students and postdoctoral researchers.

== Awards and honours ==
Sirringhaus was elected a Fellow of the Royal Society in 2009, his nomination reads:

Henning Sirringhaus is distinguished for his work on semiconductor device physics and engineering. Early in his career, at the ETH Zurich, he pioneered the technique of ballistic electron emission microscopy. At Cambridge he has transformed the field of organic semiconductor transistors from curiosity to fully manufacturable technology through both fundamental science and engineering. His insights into the polaronic nature of electron states in these materials and the control of interfacial structure made possible large increases in field-effect carrier mobility. His work on novel processing methods, including ink-jet printing, has made possible new manufacturing methods. A recent highlight is his realisation of a light-emitting field-effect transistor.
