= Gates Cambridge Scholarship =

Scholarship program funded by the Bill and Melinda Gates Foundation

- Awarded for: Post-graduate study at the University of Cambridge
- Sponsored by: Gates Foundation
- Location: Cambridge, England
- Established: 2000
- Website: gatescambridge.org

The Gates Cambridge Scholarship is an international postgraduate award for students to study at the University of Cambridge. The scholarship is extremely competitive with around 0.5% of applicants receiving an award in recent years.

== Eligibility and selection criteria ==
Applicants from any country other than the United Kingdom are eligible to apply for the Gates Cambridge Scholarships. Candidates must apply to pursue one of the following full-time residential degrees at the University of Cambridge:

- Doctor of Philosophy (PhD)
- Master of Science (MSc), Master of Letters (MLitt), Master of Philosophy (MPhil)
- Other one-year postgraduate course (e.g. LLM, MRes, MASt)

Applicants concurrently apply to a course, college and department and the offer of a Gates Cambridge Scholarship is conditional on the student gaining full placement in each.

The Gates Cambridge Trustees use four criteria to choose Scholars:

- Academic excellence: Competitiveness is evaluated through academic transcripts, references, experience and the potential to succeed on the chosen course. A departmental nomination is crucial for demonstrating this criterion;
- Choice of course: The Trust seeks Scholars who will have an academically transformative experience at Cambridge. Candidates must demonstrate intellectual superiority and the necessary skills and expertise to complete the course which they have chosen;
- A commitment to improving the lives of others: A defining characteristic of Scholars is their deep devotion to improving lives of others as evident by their past, current and future commitment to the societies in which they will live and work;
- A capacity for leadership: Candidates must show exceptional leadership elements and a pledge to 'take others with them' as future leaders of their fields and communities.

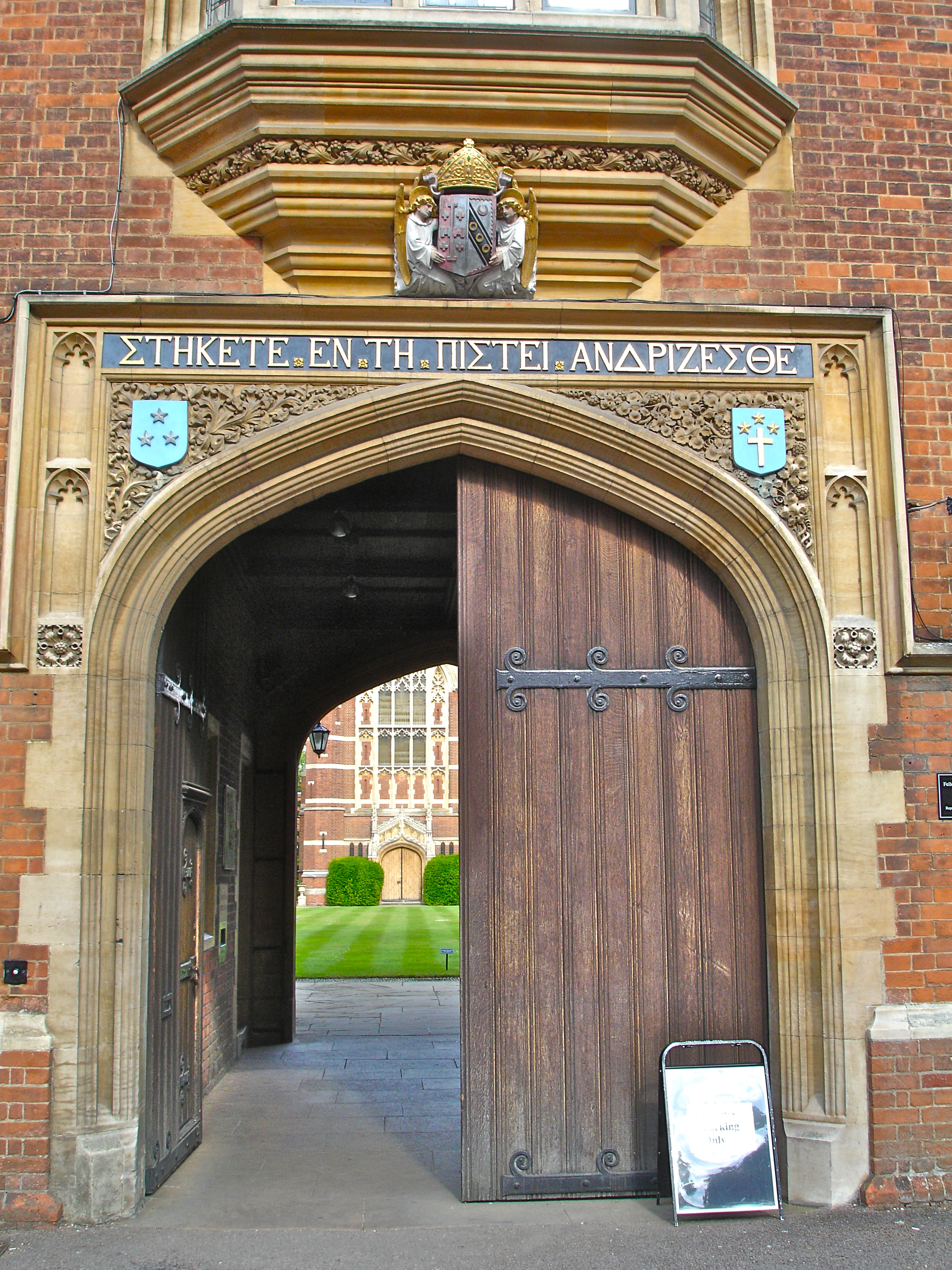
Selwyn College, Cambridge University

Generally, each class of Gates Cambridge Scholars is composed of ^{2}/_{3} PhD and ^{1}/_{3} one-year Scholars. The Gates Cambridge Trust uses a three-stage selection process to select its Scholars. The application process begins with prospective students applying to study for an eligible degree at the University of Cambridge, either during the U.S. or the global round. Following the initial application, each academic department at the University of Cambridge ranks and nominates eligible applicants for the scholarship. Departmental nominees are the most academically outstanding applicants for postgraduate studies in the department. The list of departmental nominees is then forwarded to the Gates Cambridge Trust, where it is divided into broad subject areas and passed to the Shortlisting Committees. Each Committee reviews the entirety of a departmental nominee and applies the Gates Cambridge selection criteria to shortlist applicants for interview. All shortlisted candidates are interviewed to assess how they meet all Gates Cambridge criteria and Scholars-Elect are selected only after the interview.

== Gates Cambridge Scholars organizations ==
In 2002, Gates Cambridge Scholars organized and elected a student committee titled The Gates Scholars' Council. The Council aims to represent the Gates Scholars at Cambridge and to build a scholar community interwoven into the fabric of the university. In cooperation with the Gates Cambridge Trust, the university and various academic and professional organizations, the Scholars' Council organizes a number of academic, social and professional events that have distinguished and built the reputation of the Gates Scholars at Cambridge University. The scholarship is particularly known for its strong academic and social community at Cambridge.

In 2005, the Scholars once again self-organized to create the Gates Scholars Alumni Association, which aims to build upon the friendships and contacts that were first made at Cambridge and to bridge the gap between the different generations of scholars. It is an active and growing organization, with members dispersed all over the world.

== Controversies ==
=== Criticism of the Bill and Melinda Gates Foundation ===
The Bill and Melinda Gates Foundation reduced its investments in non-renewable energy in 2016, after recipients of the Gates Cambridge Scholarship had urged the Foundation's trustees to divest from fossil fuels a year earlier.

The Foundation gave Indian Prime Minister Narendra Modi its 2019 Global Goalkeeper Award for the Swachh Bharat Mission and the "progress India has made in providing safe sanitation under his leadership." More than 100 Gates Cambridge Scholars and alumni had condemned the Foundation's decision, following the Indian government's decision to withdraw the special status of the disputed territory of Jammu and Kashmir.

== Notable scholars ==
Name	University	Cambridge College	Year	Nationality	Field
Kayla Barron	US Naval Academy	Peterhouse	2010	USA	NASA astronaut
Eric Cervini	Harvard University	King's	2015	USA	historian
Charles B. Chang	Harvard University	Trinity	2005	USA	linguist
Molly Crockett	UCLA	King's	2006	USA	neuroscientist
Johanna Hanink	University of Michigan	Queens'	2006	USA	classicist
Juliet Lapidos	Yale University	Hughes Hall	2005	USA	journalist and author
Kate Marvel	UC Berkeley	Trinity	2003	USA	climate scientist and science writer
Kamalini Mukherji	Jadavpur University	St. John's	2002	India	vocalist
Greg Nance	University of Chicago	Fitzwilliam	2011	USA	ultramarathon runner and entrepreneur
Jaya Savige	University of Queensland	Christ's	2008	Australia	poet
Robyn Scott	University of Auckland	St. Catharine's	2004	New Zealand	entrepreneur and writer
Jay Silver	Georgia Tech	Churchill	2002	USA	toy inventor
Tara Westover	BYU	Trinity	2008	USA	writer and memoirist
Melanie Wood	Duke University	Trinity	2003	USA	mathematician
Yeo Bee Yin	Universiti Teknologi Petronas	Corpus Christi	2009	Malaysia	politician
Tyler Goodspeed	Harvard University	Emmanuel	2009	USA	economist
Usha Vance	Yale University	Clare	2010	USA	lawyer, Second Lady of the US
Mary Fan	University of Arizona	St. John's	2007	USA	law professor
Bilal Mahmood	Stanford University	King's	2009	USA	entrepreneur and civil servant
Carol Ibe	Georgetown University, University of Oxford	Newnham	2015	USA	founder, JR Biotek Foundation
Jerelle Joseph	University of the West Indies	Churchill	2014	Dominica	professor of chemical and biological engineering
Alessio Ciulli	University of Florence	Wolfson	2002	Italy	professor of chemical and structural biology, Fellow of the Royal Society of Chemistry
David Haskell	Yale University	Queens'	2001	USA	Editor-in-chief of New York and co-founder of Kings County Distillery
Iryna Shuvalova	National University of Kyiv, Dartmouth College	St. John's	2016	Ukraine	poet, translator and scholar
Jessica Grahn	Northwestern University	Wolfson	2001	USA	music neuroscientist
Shadrack Frimpong	University of Pennsylvania, Yale University	Jesus	2020	Ghana	entrepreneur and global health leader, founder of Cocoa360
Brady Wagoner	Clark University	Corpus Christi	2005	USA	professor of psychology
Michael G. Masters	University of Michigan	Hughes Hall	2001	USA	lawyer and global security consultant
Jana Zaumseil	Leipzig University	St. John's	2003	Germany	professor of physical chemistry
Victoria Herrmann	Lehigh University, Carleton University	Pembroke	2014	USA	polar geographer and climate change communicator
Scott Kaufman	Carnegie Mellon University	King's	2003	USA	cognitive scientist, author, podcaster, coach, and popular science writer
Urbasi Sinha	University of Cambridge	Queens'	2002	India	quantum physicist and professor
Rob Henderson	Yale University	St. Catharine's	2018	USA	writer and political commentator
Emily Kassie	Brown University	St. John's	2016	Canada	investigative journalist and documentary filmmaker
Caitlin Casey	University of Arizona	St. John's	2007	USA	observational astronomer
Todd Tucker	George Washington University	Queens'	2012	USA	academic, political scientist, and political commentator
Yassamin Ansari	Stanford University	St. John's	2012	USA	US congresswoman
Kate Brandt	Brown University	Selwyn College	2007	USA	Chief Sustainability Officer at Google
William Greenleaf	Harvard University	Trinity	2002	USA	molecular biologist, biophysicist, inventor, and professor
Njoki Wamai	University of Nairobi, King's College London	Queens'	2012	Kenya	feminist activist and professor
Naomi Woo	Yale University	Clare	2013	Canada	conductor and pianist
Christopher Tooley	Massey University, University of Auckland	Girton	2002	New Zealand	academic, executive and indigenous health leader

== See also ==
- Churchill Scholarship at Cambridge University
- Rhodes Scholarship at Oxford University
- Clarendon Scholarship at Oxford University
- Yenching Scholarship at Peking University
- Schwarzman Scholarship at Tsinghua University
- Commonwealth Scholarship and Fellowship Plan
- Marshall Scholarship for any university in the United Kingdom
- Mitchell Scholarship for any university in the Republic of Ireland or Northern Ireland
- Knight-Hennessy Scholars at Stanford University
- Jardine Scholarship at University of Oxford and University of Cambridge
