= Brady Wagoner =

American-Danish professor of psychology

- Born: September 19, 1980 (age 45)
- Education: University of Cambridge; Clark University
- Scientific career
- Fields: Cultural psychology
- Workplaces: University of Copenhagen; Aalborg University

Brady Wagoner (born September 19, 1980) is an American-Danish professor of psychology at the University of Copenhagen and Aalborg University (Denmark), where he is currently co-director of the Centre for Cultural Psychology. He received his PhD from the University of Cambridge on a Gates Cambridge scholarship, where he also co-created the F. C. Bartlett internet archive. His research has mainly focused on cultural psychology, memory, social change and the history of psychology. One of his key contributions has been to study remembering as a cultural and constructive process, further developing the legacy of Frederic Bartlett. He was honored with the Alexander von Humboldt Prize in 2021, the Lucienne Domergue Award in 2019, and the Sigmund Koch Award in 2018.

== Education and career ==
Brady Wagoner holds a BA in Philosophy and Psychology from Clark University and an MPhil in Social and Developmental Psychology from the University of Cambridge. He also received his PhD in Social and Political Science at the University of Cambridge in 2010.

He has subsequently been employed at Aalborg University, where he became a professor 3 years later, in 2013. He is also currently co-director of The Centre for Cultural Psychology and the Master program in Cultural Psychology and Educational Practice at Aalborg University.

His research has developed a social and culturally sensitive psychology that focuses on unfolding processes rather than static outcomes, particularly with regards to constructive remembering. This involves studying change in individuals, societies, and the relationship between them. In addition to his work on culture and memory, he has recently been studying people's understanding of the COVID-19 pandemic (including vaccination decision making) and has started a project exploring the 'romantic roots' of developmental psychology in holistic German thought.

In 2012, he received a 20 million DKK grant from the Danish Basic Research Fund, which started the "Niels Bohr Centre for Cultural Psychology". In 2016 he received a grant of 12.6 million DKK by the Obelske Familiefond for the project "The Culture of Grief" (led by Svend Brinkmann). Finally, he was a senior researcher on the "viral communication" project, investigating people's understanding and adaptation to the COVID-19 pandemic in Germany.

Wagoner has held a visiting professorship in Brazil, Chile, France, Spain and the Netherlands, and is a recipient of a number of research awards.

He has also held numerous editorial positions, including associate editor of the journal Culture and Psychology (London: SAGE Publications, 2009–present), co-editor of the book series Creativity and Culture (Palgrave, UK, 2014–present), and co-editor of the book series Niels Bohr Professorship Lectures in Cultural Psychology (Information Age, US, 2013-2020).

== Awards ==
- 2022: Research Fellow, Netherlands Institute for Advanced Study, Netherlands
- 2021: Alexander von Humboldt Award. Humboldt Foundation, Germany
- 2020: Research Fellow, Lyon Institute for Advanced Studies, France
- 2019: Lucienne Domergue Award, Casa de Velázquez, Spain
- 2018: Sigmund Koch Award, American Psychological Association, US
- 2018: Research Fellow, Lyon Institute for Advanced Studies, France
- 2017: Early career award, American Psychological Association, US
- 2016: Visiting honorary professor, Federal University of Pernambuco, Brazil
- 2009 : Sigmund Koch Prize, International Society for Theoretical Psychology
- 2005 : Gates Cambridge Scholarship, Bill & Melinda Gates Foundation, UK
- 2005: Overseas Research Students Award, University of Cambridge, UK
- 2003 : Howard Bonar Jefferson Prize, Clark University, US
- 2003: David N. Saltman 83' Prize for Excellence in Philosophy, Clark University, US

== Selected books ==
- Wagoner, B., Jensen, E., & Oldmeadow, J. A. (Eds.). (2012). Culture and social change: Transforming society through the power of ideas. Information Age Publishing.
- Wagoner, B. (2017). The Constructive Mind: Bartlett's Psychology in Reconstruction. Cambridge: Cambridge University Press.
- Wagoner, B. (Ed.) (2018). Handbook of Culture and Memory. Oxford: Oxford University Press.
- Wagoner, B., Moghaddam, F. & Valsiner, J. (Eds.) (2018). The Psychology of Radical Social Change: From Rage to Revolution. Cambridge: Cambridge University Press.
- Wagoner, B., Bresco, I., & Awad, S.H. (2019). Remembering as a Cultural Process. New York: Springer.
- Wagoner, B., Christensen, B., & Demuth, C. (Eds.) (2021). Culture as Process: A tribute to Jaan Valsiner. New York: Springer.
