= Mars Oxygen ISRU Experiment =

2020 Mars electrochemical experiment demonstrated by NASA

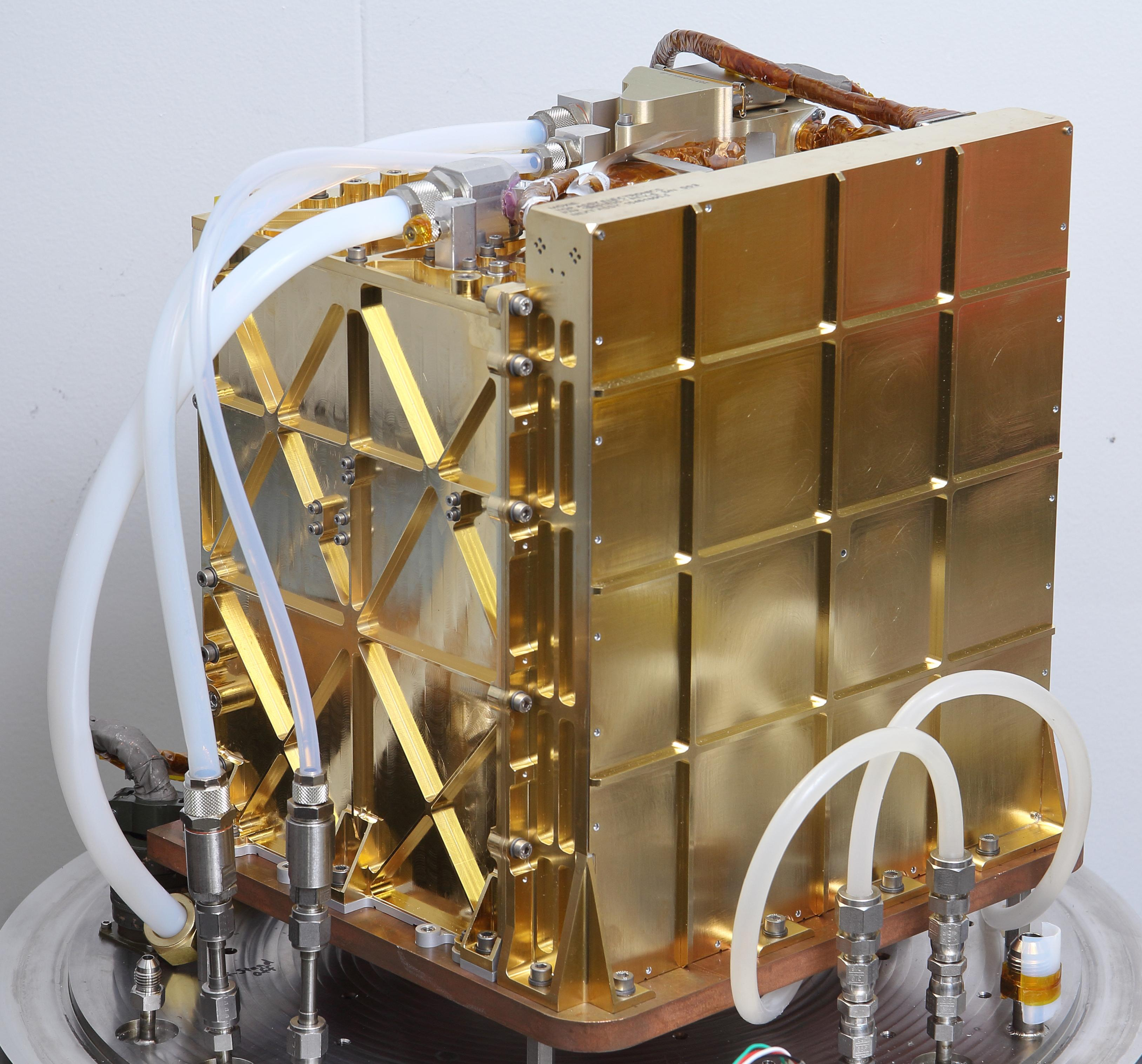
- Mars Oxygen In-Situ Resource Utilization Experiment (MOXIE)
- Operator: NASA
- Manufacturer: NASA/Caltech/Jet Propulsion Laboratory; OxEon Energy
- Instrument type: ISRU (in situ resource utilization) experimental technology
- Function: Oxygen production
- Began operations: 20 April 2021
- Ceased operations: 3 August 2023
- Website: mars.nasa.gov/mars2020/mission/instruments/moxie/

Properties
- Mass: 15 kg (33 lb)
- Dimensions: 24 × 24 × 31 cm
- Power consumption: 300 W

Host spacecraft
- Spacecraft: Perseverance
- Launch date: July 30, 2020
- Rocket: Atlas V 541
- Launch site: Cape Canaveral SLC-41

The Mars Oxygen In-Situ Resource Utilization Experiment (MOXIE) was a technology demonstration on the NASA Mars 2020 rover Perseverance investigating the production of oxygen on Mars. On April 20, 2021, MOXIE produced oxygen from carbon dioxide in the Martian atmosphere by using solid oxide electrolysis. This was the first experimental extraction of a natural resource from another planet for human use. The technology may be scaled up for use in a human mission to the planet to provide breathable oxygen, oxidizer, and propellant; water may also be produced by combining the produced oxygen with hydrogen.

The experiment was a collaboration between the Massachusetts Institute of Technology, the Haystack Observatory, the NASA/Caltech Jet Propulsion Laboratory, with OxEon Energy.

== Objective ==
MOXIE's objective was to produce oxygen of at least 98% purity at a rate of 6–10 grams per hour (0.21–0.35 oz/h) and to do this at least ten times, so the device can be tested in a range of times of the day, including at night, and in most environmental conditions, including during a dust storm.

== Development ==
MOXIE builds upon an earlier experiment, the Mars In-situ propellant production Precursor (MIP), which was designed and built to fly on the Mars Surveyor 2001 Lander mission. MIP was intended to demonstrate In-Situ Propellant Production (ISPP) on a laboratory scale using electrolysis of carbon dioxide to produce oxygen. The MIP flight demonstration was postponed when the Mars Surveyor 2001 lander mission was cancelled after the Mars Polar Lander mission failed.

The Principal Investigator (PI) of MOXIE was Michael Hecht from the Haystack Observatory at Massachusetts Institute of Technology (MIT). The deputy PI was former NASA astronaut Jeffrey Hoffman from the Department of Aeronautics and Astronautics at MIT. The project manager was Jeff Mellstrom from the NASA/Caltech Jet Propulsion Laboratory (JPL). Along with MIT and JPL, major contributors are OxEon Energy (previously Ceramatec, Inc.) and Air Squared. Other contributors include Imperial College London, Space Exploration Instruments LLC, Lunar Outpost (previously Destiny Space Systems LLC), the Niels Bohr Institute at the University of Copenhagen, Arizona State University, and the Technical University of Denmark.

Cutaway

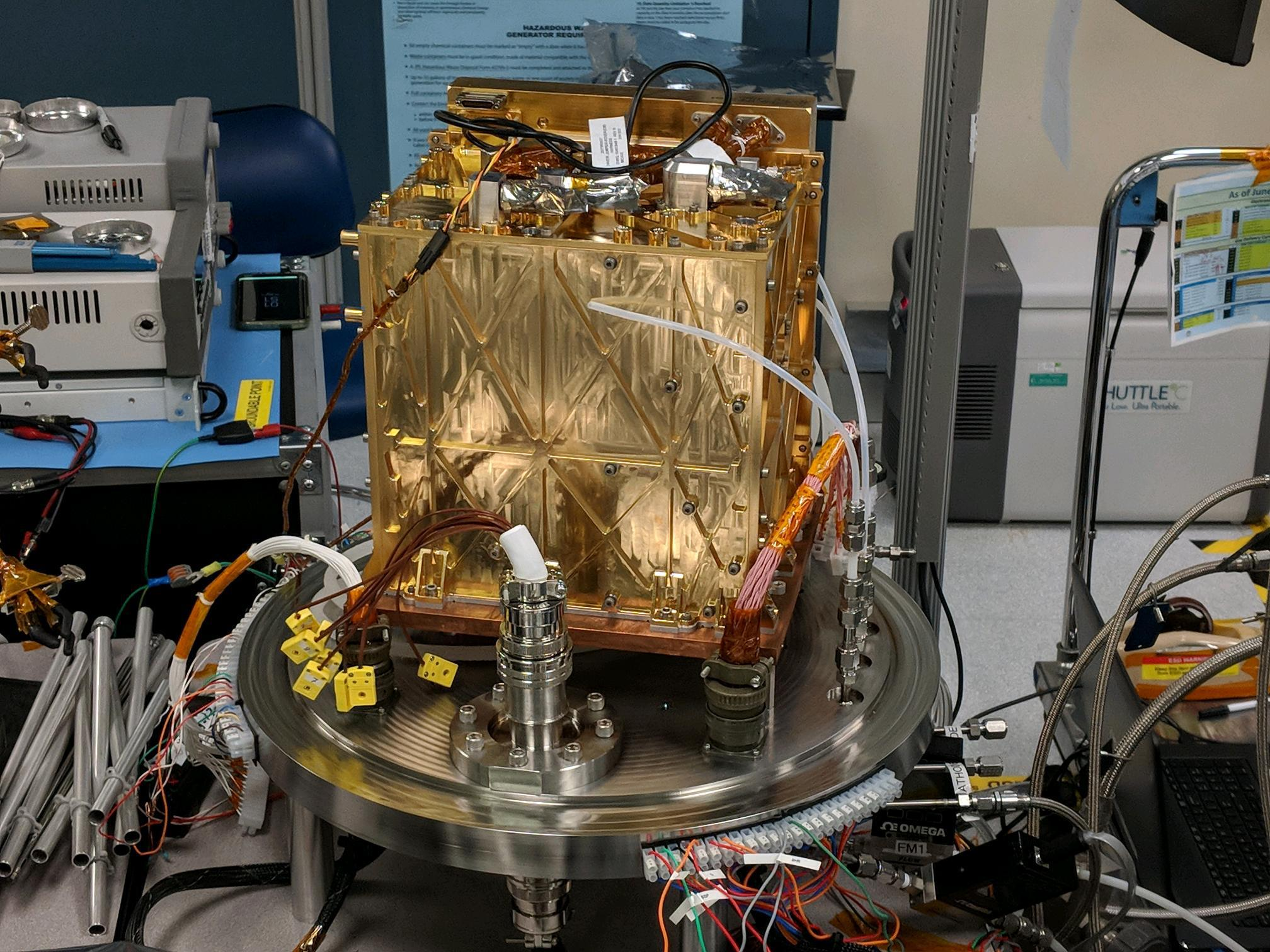
Testing

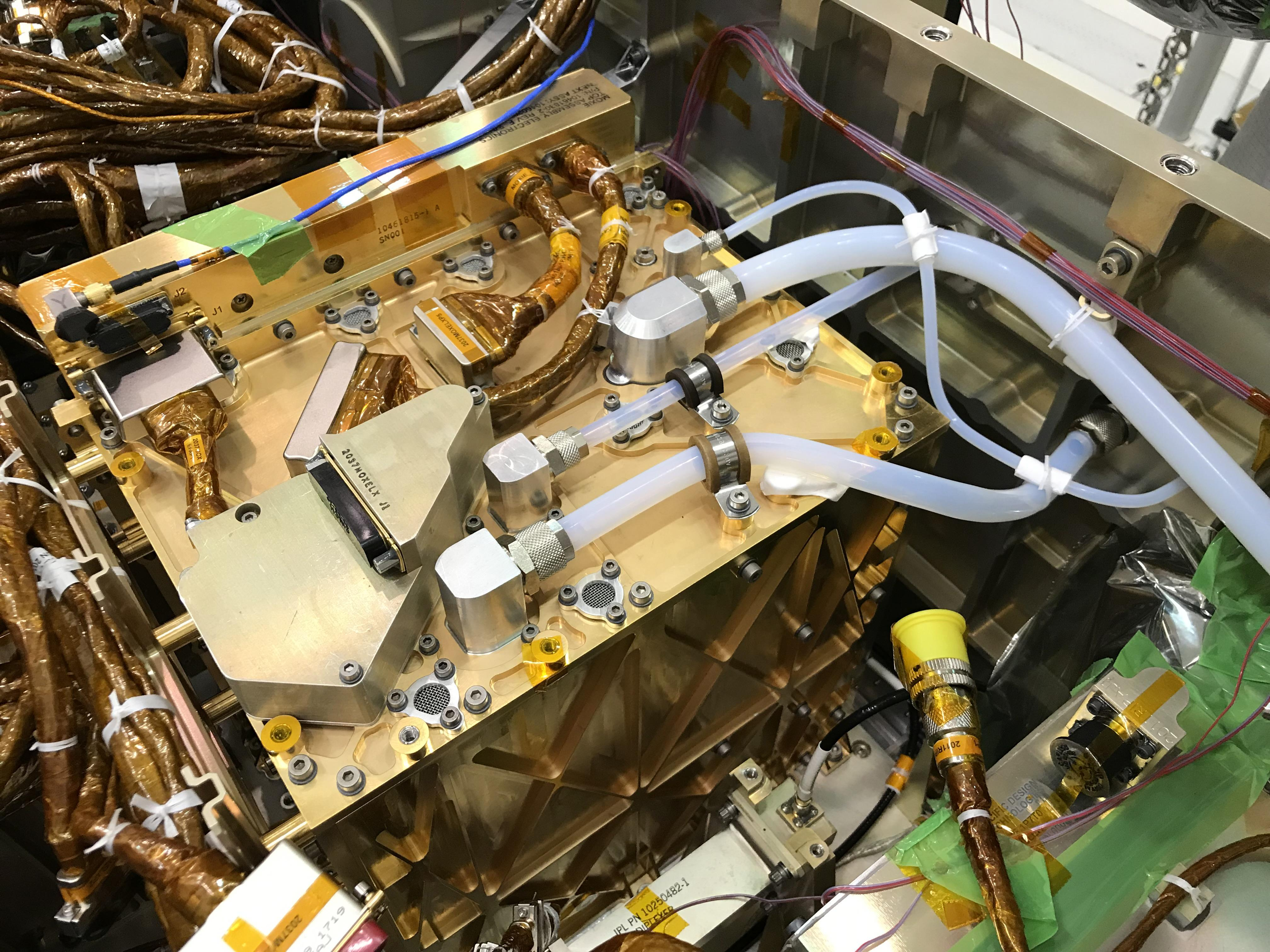
Installed

== Main Idea ==
The main idea used in moxie is electrochemistry. Three main parts are:

Input: Moxie takes in carbon dioxide from Mars atmosphere.

Process: Heating and electrical energy allow a solid oxide electrolysis cell to separate oxygen from carbon dioxide.

Output: The system overall produce oxygen gas and carbon monoxide.

== Principle ==
MOXIE acquires, compresses, and heats Martian atmospheric gases using a HEPA filter, scroll compressor, and heaters alongside insulation, then splits the carbon dioxide (CO_{2}) molecules into oxygen (O) and carbon monoxide (CO) using solid oxide electrolysis, where the O atoms combine to form gaseous oxygen (O_{2}).

The conversion process requires a temperature of approximately 800 °C (1,470 °F). A solid oxide electrolysis cell works on the principle that, at elevated temperatures, certain ceramic oxides, such as yttria-stabilized zirconia (YSZ) and doped ceria, become oxide ion (O^{2–}) conductors. A thin nonporous disk of YSZ (solid electrolyte) is sandwiched between two porous electrodes. CO_{2} diffuses through the porous electrode (cathode) and reaches the vicinity of the electrode-electrolyte boundary. Through a combination of thermal dissociation and electrocatalysis, an oxygen atom is liberated from the CO_{2} molecule and picks up two electrons from the cathode to become an oxide ion (O^{2–}). Via oxygen ion vacancies in the crystal lattice of the electrolyte, the oxygen ion is transported to the electrolyte–anode interface due to the applied DC potential. At this interface, the oxygen ion transfers its charge to the anode, combines with another oxygen atom to form oxygen (O_{2}), and diffuses out of the anode.

The net reaction was thus 2 CO_{2} $\longrightarrow$ 2 CO + O_{2}. Inert gases such as nitrogen gas (N_{2}) and argon (Ar) are not separated from the feed, but returned to the atmosphere with the carbon monoxide (CO) and unused CO_{2}.

== Mars experiment ==
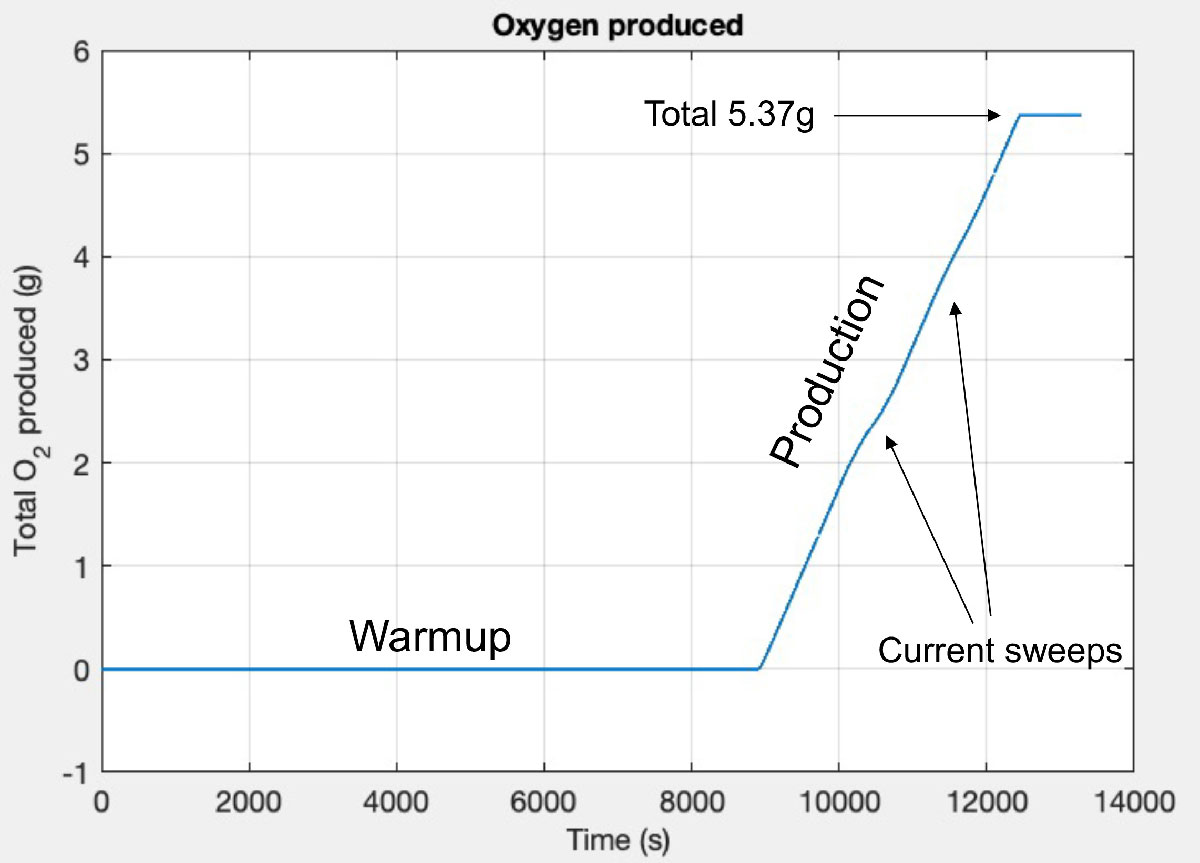
MOXIE first martian oxygen production test on April 20, 2021, graph

Oxygen production was first achieved on April 20, 2021, in Jezero Crater, producing 5.37 grams (0.189 oz) of oxygen, equivalent to what an astronaut on Mars would need to breathe for roughly 10 minutes. MOXIE was designed to safely generate up to 10 g/h (0.35 oz/h) of oxygen, with theoretical production limited to 12 grams per hour (0.42 oz/h) of oxygen due to the limited capacity of the 4 ampere flight power supply. The oxygen produced was analyzed, and then released back into the atmosphere.

MOXIE was used to isolate oxygen a further nine more times over the course of approximately two Earth years, or one Martian year, in three stages; the first stage will further investigate the oxygen production, the second to test the instrument in a variety of times of day, seasons, and atmospheric conditions, and the third to produce oxygen at different temperatures, and alter the mode of operation to investigate differences in production.

On April 21, 2021, Jim Reuter, the Associate Administrator for STMD explained that the experiment was functioning with results having many uses, stating: "This is a critical first step at converting carbon dioxide to oxygen on Mars. MOXIE has more work to do, but the results from this technology demonstration are full of promise as we move toward our goal of one day seeing humans on Mars. Oxygen isn’t just the stuff we breathe. Rocket propellant depends on oxygen, and future explorers will depend on producing propellant on Mars to make the trip home."

MOXIE had generated a total of 122 g (4.3 oz) of oxygen – about what a small dog breathes in 10 hours. At its most efficient, MOXIE was able to produce 12 grams per hour (0.42 oz/h) of oxygen – twice as much as NASA’s original goals for the instrument – at 98% purity or better. On its 16th and final run, on August 7, 2023, the instrument made 9.8 g (0.35 oz) of oxygen. MOXIE successfully completed all of its technical requirements and was operated at a variety of conditions throughout a full Mars year, allowing the instrument’s developers to learn a great deal about the technology.

== Implications ==
NASA states that if MOXIE worked efficiently, they could land an approximately 200-times larger, MOXIE-based instrument on the planet, along with a power plant capable of generating 25–30 kilowatts (34–40 hp). Over the course of approximately one Earth year, this system would produce oxygen at a rate of at least 2 kilograms per hour (4.4 lb/h) in support of a human mission sometime in the 2030s. The stored oxygen could be used for life support, but the primary need is for an oxidizer for a Mars ascent vehicle. It was projected, for example, in a mission of four astronauts on the Martian surface for a year, only about 1 metric ton of oxygen would be used for life support for the entire year, compared to about 25 metric tons of oxygen needed for propulsion off the surface of Mars for the return mission. The CO, a byproduct of the reaction, may be collected and used as a low-grade fuel or reacted with water to form methane (CH_{4}) for use as a primary fuel. As an alternative use, an oxygen generation system could fill a small oxygen tank as fuel-oxidizer to support a sample return mission. The oxygen could also be combined with hydrogen to form water.

== Technical specifications ==
Data from NASA (MARS 2020 Mission Perseverance Rover), Ceramatec and OxEon Energy, NASA Jet Propulsion Laboratory.

- Main job: To produce oxygen from the Martian carbon dioxide atmosphere.
- Location: Inside the rover (front, right side)
- Mass: 17.1 kilograms
- Weight: 37.7 lbf (168 N) on Earth, 14.14 lbf (62.9 N) on Mars
- Power: 300 watts
- Volume: 9.4 in × 9.4 in × 12.2 in (24 cm × 24 cm × 31 cm)
- Oxygen production rate: Up to 10 grams (0.022 lb) per hour
- Operation time: Approximately one hour of oxygen (O_{2}) production per experiment, which will be scheduled intermittently over the duration of the mission.

MOXIE: Operational Design Drive (SIZE):

- Gas flow: Internally manifolded for O_{2} purity and dP
- Feed: Dry CO_{2} in a range of 30–80 g/hr
- Product: 99.6% pure O_{2}, internal manifolding
- Structural: Robust to survive launch, EDL shock and vibe, compression load requirements
- Power: Highly constrained
- Mass: 1 kg max
- Volume: Rigidly constrained
- Operation: 20+ 120 minute cycles
- Heating ramps: 90 minutes (c. 515 °C/hour) from ambient(potentially −40 °C) to 800 °C.
- Heat application: Heaters on endplates only

MOXIE: Materials Design Drivers:

- Interconnects (IC): Powder metallurgy (CFY, Plansee)
- Seals: Glass seals
- Current busbars: Brazed rod / welded wire
- Feed manifolds: Inlet tube/internal manifold O_{2} purity
- Anode electrode: Perovskite
- Cathode electrode: Modified proprietary Cermet
- Electrolyte: Scandia-stabilized zirconia (ScSZ)

MOXIE: Cell design:

- Number of cells: 10 (arranged in two stacks of 5 cells each)
- Oxygen production: 10 grams per hour (>1g/hr. per cell)
- Each cell consists of:
  - Electrolyte (yttria-stabilized zirconia (YSZ))
  - Cathode
  - Anode

Connecting cells:

- High chromium alloy (matched CTE to ceramic electrolyte)
  - Approximately 100 mm × 50 mm × 2 mm (3.937 in × 1.969 in × 0.079 in)
  - Contains manifolding for gas streams

MOXIE: Gas delivery system (scroll compressor):

- Scroll pump compression rate: Up to approximately 1 bar
- Scroll pump RPM: Low-speed (2000–4000 RPM)
- Performance: Inlet gas: 83 g/hr, P = 7 Torr, T = 20 °C, Pin = 120 W, Mass: c. 2 kg

MOXIE: Targets:

- Operational Cycles: The primary mission requirements call for the capability to operate a total of 20 cycles:
  - 10 cycles preflight
  - 10+ cycles on Mars
- Qualification and verification testing: It involves 60 full operational cycles for proof of extensibility, which is three times the number of cycles planned for the primary mission.
- Oxygen purity: 99.6%+ at end of life
- Temperature capability: Capable to operate at −65 °C proof temperature
- Compression, shock, and vibe requirements:
  - Withstand 8 kN compressive force
  - Withstand (PF) + 3 dB levels for flight shock and vibe requirements
