= Mian Chin =

Chinese atmospheric chemist

- 秦勉
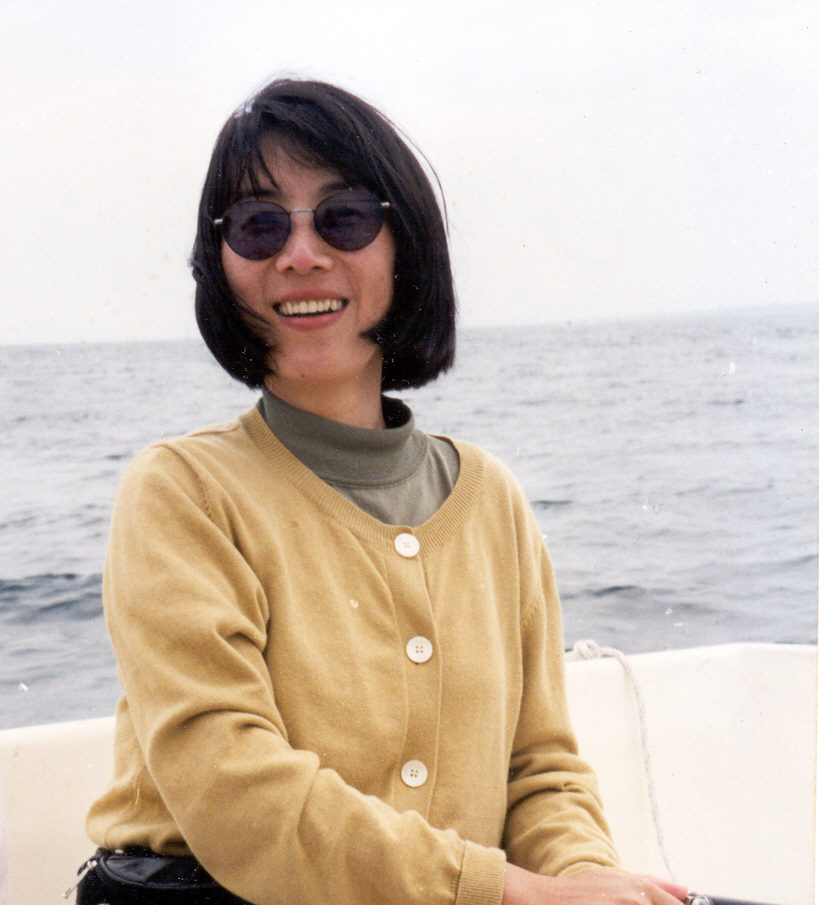
- Born: Shanghai, China
- Education: East China Normal University (BS); Ball State University (MA); Georgia Tech (PhD)
- Awards: NASA Exceptional Achievement Medal (2005)
- Scientific career
- Fields: Physical and atmospheric chemistry
- Workplaces: Universities Space Research Association; Georgia Tech; Goddard Space Flight Center
- Thesis: An atmospheric study of carbonyl sulfide and carbon disulfide and their relationship to stratospheric background sulfur aerosol (1992)
- Doctoral advisor: Paul Wine

Mian Chin (Chinese: 秦勉; pinyin: Qín Miǎn) is a Chinese atmospheric chemist. She is a physical scientist in the atmospheric chemistry and dynamics laboratory in the earth science division at Goddard Space Flight Center. Her research includes aerosol-cloud-chemistry-climate interactions. She received the NASA Exceptional Achievement Medal in 2005.

== Early life and education ==
Chin was born in Shanghai, China. Beginning at the age of nine, Chin attended the Children's Music School at the Shanghai Conservatory of Music for three years to study piano. When she was thirteen, her education abruptly stopped due to the Cultural Revolution. After a little more than two years idling at school with chaos everywhere in China, Chin was sent to a farm in the very north of China near Siberia, three days away from Shanghai by train, as part of Mao Zedong's educated youth program. Many other children her age were sent there as well. More than forty children lived in one room. They each had a “living” space of two feet. She worked on that farm for nine years, until Chairman Mao's death, which ended the Cultural Revolution.

For nine years, a Chin and group of other children quietly studied math, physics and chemistry. Her parents and friend's mother in Shanghai sent them textbooks and they taught themselves. At the farm, they had no phones. Electricity had to be turned off no later than 9 p.m., so they studied in the evenings with candlelight. In 1977, the National College Entrance Examination that were stopped during the Cultural Revolution, resumed. Chin had to take two college entrance exams, a preliminary and a final. Because of her studies at night, she passed the preliminary exam. After the preliminary test results came back, Chin was given two hours to choose a college and a major from the hand-written list posted on the walls inside a classroom in a local elementary school. She chose one college that was near her home in Shanghai as well as others in different places.

Chin received a B.S. degree in chemistry from East China Normal University in 1982, a M.A. degree in chemistry from Ball State University in 1986, and a Ph.D. degree in Atmospheric Sciences from Georgia Tech in 1992. During her graduate study in Georgia Tech, Chin was involved in field experiments measuring atmospheric constituents, laboratory study determining atmospheric photochemical reaction rates and product yields, and one-dimensional photochemical model estimating stratospheric sulfur budget. Her dissertation was titled An atmospheric study of carbonyl sulfide and carbon disulfide and their relationship to stratospheric background sulfur aerosol. Chin's doctoral advisors were Paul Wine and Douglas Davis.

Between 1992 and 1995, Chin was a postdoctoral fellow in the Harvard John A. Paulson School of Engineering and Applied Sciences where she worked with 3-dimensional regional and global atmospheric chemistry and transport models for studying tropospheric ozone, aerosols, and trace gases.

== Career ==
Chin was a research scientist at Universities Space Research Association from 1995 to 1997 and a research scientist and senior research scientist at Georgia Institute of Technology from 1997 to 2003 before she joined the NASA Goddard Space Flight Center in 2003, concentrating on atmospheric model development and satellite data analysis. Chin is a physical scientist in the Atmospheric Chemistry and Dynamics Laboratory, Earth Science Division, at the NASA Goddard Space Flight Center (GSFC).

=== Research ===
Chin has served as principal investigator for many research projects since 1997 that involve global and regional modeling of tropospheric aerosols and chemistry. She and her coworkers have developed the Goddard Chemistry Aerosol Radiation and Transport (GOCART) model, which has been used to simulate tropospheric aerosols and related gas species, CO, and radionuclides for climate, air quality, and global change studies, with a special focus on analysis of satellite and sub-orbital observations.

Chin's research at GSFC includes aerosol-cloud-chemistry-climate interactions, regional and global air quality, transport of aerosols and trace gases, aerosol impacts on global energy balance, and modeling and analysis of data from satellite, ground-based, and airborne observations.

== Awards and honors ==
In 1997, Chin received the Editor's Citation for excellence in refereeing from the Journal of Geophysical Research. In 2005, she was awarded the exceptional achievement award and NASA Exceptional Achievement Medal from GSFC. In 2021, Chin was elected a fellow of the American Geophysical Union. She is also a member of American Meteorological Society where she was elected as a Fellow of the AMS in recognition of her contributions to atmospheric science.

== Selected works ==
- Chin, Mian (2009). Atmospheric Aerosol Properties and Climate Impacts. DIANE Publishing. ISBN 9781437912616.
