= Molly J. Crockett =

American neuroscientist

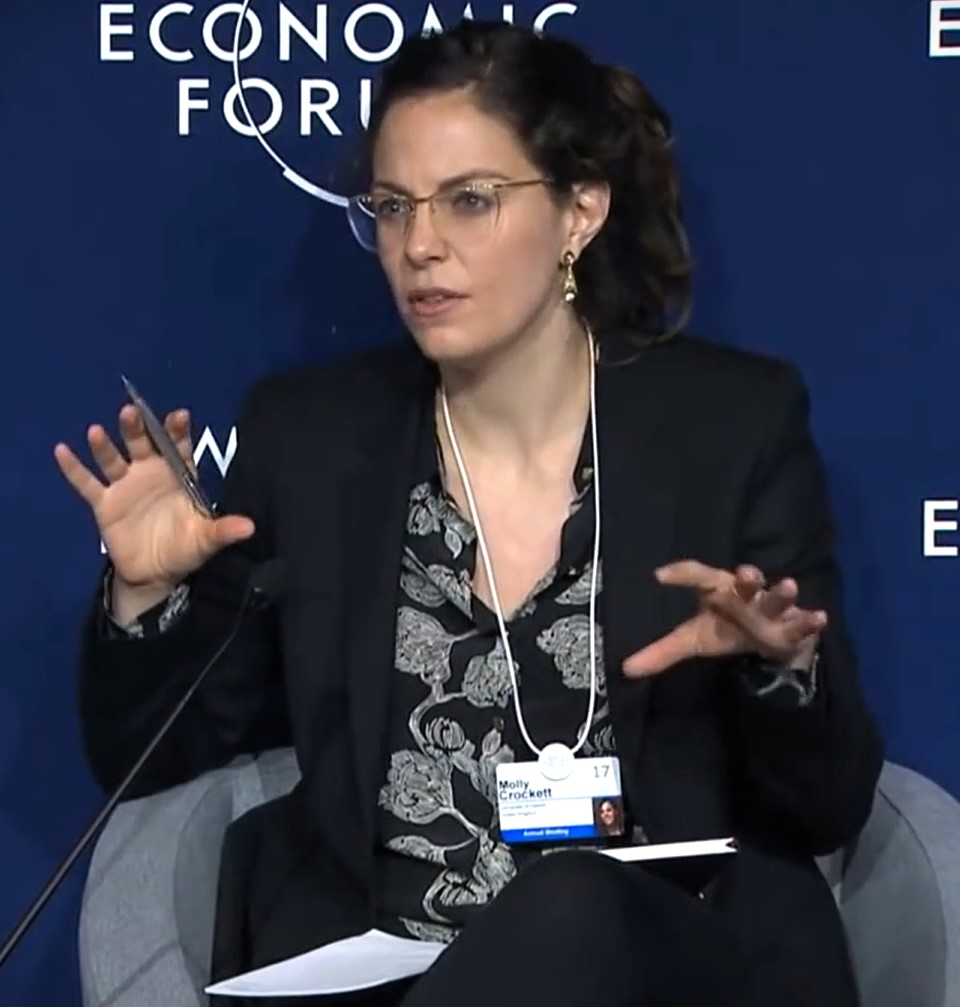
- Crockett speaks at the 2017 World Economic Forum
- Education: University of California, Los Angeles (BA); King's College, Cambridge (PhD)
- Awards: APS Janet Taylor Spence Award (2019)
- Scientific career
- Fields: Neuroscience
- Workplaces: Princeton University; Yale University; University of Oxford
- Doctoral advisor: Prof Trevor Robbins

Molly J. Crockett is an American neuroscientist who studies human morality, altruism and decision making. They received the 2019 Janet Taylor Spence Award from the Association for Psychological Science.

== Career ==
Crockett is originally from Irvine, California. They are an associate professor of psychology at Princeton University. Previously they were an associate professor of Psychology at Yale, and associate professor of experimental Psychology at the University of Oxford, a fellow at University College London and the University of Zürich, funded by the Sir Henry Wellcome Postdoctoral Fellowship from the Wellcome Trust, awarded in 2010. After completing her Bachelor of Science at the University of California, Los Angeles, they completed their PhD at King's College, Cambridge, where she was a Gates Cambridge Scholar.

== Work ==
Crockett studies behavioral neuroscience, with a particular focus on the role of neurotransmitters on decision-making, for example studying how antidepressants affect negotiations in experimental settings. They have criticized science journalists for over hyping the generality of some of their research findings.

Recently, Crockett has begun researching moral outrage.

Works

- Lieberman, MD; Eisenberger, NI; Crockett, MJ; Tom, SM; Pfeifer, JH; Way, BM (May 2007). "Putting feelings into words: affect labeling disrupts amygdala activity in response to affective stimuli". Psychological Science. 18 (5): 421–8. doi:10.1111/j.1467-9280.2007.01916.x. PMID 17576282. S2CID 1445321.
- Crockett, MJ; Clark, L; Tabibnia, G; Lieberman, MD; Robbins, TW (27 June 2008). "Serotonin modulates behavioral reactions to unfairness". Science. 320 (5884): 1739. Bibcode:2008Sci...320.1739C. doi:10.1126/science.1155577. PMC 2504725. PMID 18535210.
- Crockett, MJ; Clark, L; Hauser, MD; Robbins, TW (5 October 2010). "Serotonin selectively influences moral judgment and behavior through effects on harm aversion". Proceedings of the National Academy of Sciences of the United States of America. 107 (40): 17433–8. Bibcode:2010PNAS..10717433C. doi:10.1073/pnas.1009396107. PMC 2951447. PMID 20876101.
- Crockett, MJ; Clark, L; Robbins, TW (23 September 2009). "Reconciling the role of serotonin in behavioral inhibition and aversion: acute tryptophan depletion abolishes punishment-induced inhibition in humans". The Journal of Neuroscience. 29 (38): 11993–9. doi:10.1523/JNEUROSCI.2513-09.2009. PMC 2775933. PMID 19776285.
- Lieberman, MD; Inagaki, TK; Tabibnia, G; Crockett, MJ (June 2011). "Subjective responses to emotional stimuli during labeling, reappraisal, and distraction". Emotion. 11 (3): 468–80. doi:10.1037/a0023503. PMC 3444304. PMID 21534661.
- Crockett, Molly J.; Fehr, Ernst (2014). "Chapter 14: Pharmacology of Economic and Social Decision Making". In Glimcher, Paul W.; Fehr, Ernst (eds.). Neuroeconomics: decision making and the brain (2nd ed.). Elsevier Academic Press. pp. 259–279. ISBN 9780124160088.
