= Makey Makey =

Electronic invention tool and toy

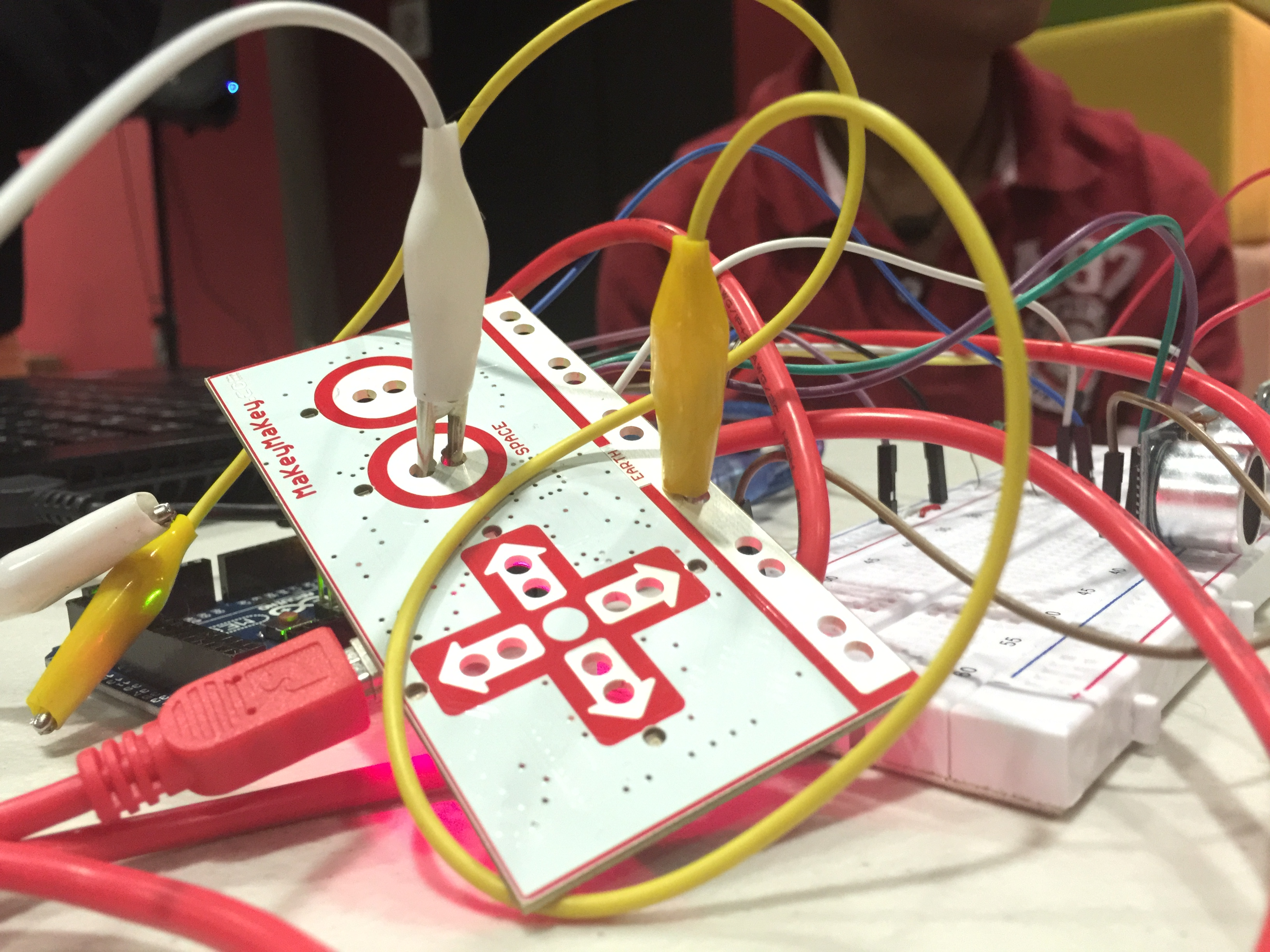
A Makey Makey board used during a hack-a-thon in Mexico City.

Makey Makey: An Invention Kit for Everyone is an invention kit designed to connect everyday objects to computer keys. Using a circuit board, alligator clips, and a USB cable, the toy uses closed loop electrical signals to send the computer either a keyboard stroke or mouse click signal. This function allows the Makey Makey to work with any computer program or webpage that accepts keyboard or mouse click.

== Product background ==
Originally created as an academic and artistic project by two MIT students, Jay Silver and Eric Rosenbaum, the Makey Makey was produced by research done at MIT Media Lab's Lifelong Kindergarten. Prior to creating the Makey Makey, Jay Silver and Eric Rosenbaum also worked on creative tools and invention kits such as Drawdio, Singing Fingers, and Scratch.

The first prototype for Makey Makey was created in 2010 and tested at a workshop at San Francisco Exploratorium where participants used the product to create a game called "Drum Pants" that used a beach ball as a controller and water buckets as the foot-pads to play the console game, Dance Dance Revolution. The Second Prototype was created in 2011 and 2012 and tested with interactive design specialists, after which the final prototype was tested at the Maker Faire in San Francisco in 2012 before the end of the Kickstarter campaign.

== Funding ==
Makey Makey was started through a Kickstarter campaign that raised over $50,000. Following its initial funding on Kickstarter, Makey Makey was written about in Mashable, Wired, and New Scientist, among others.

== Technical specifications ==
The Makey Makey board was originally designed around the Atmel 32U4 microcontroller. The controller uses all 12 analog input pins on the 32U4 microcontroller in combination with a pull-up resistor array to sense the low voltages returning from conducting materials like fruit or skin. This microcontroller can easily be used as a USB-HID device and act as a keyboard, gamepad or mouse. The hardware design is very similar to the Arduino Leonardo, with some added pull-up resistors and indication LED's. Because of the similarities you can easily turn a regular Arduino Leonardo into a Makey Makey compatible device. You can also program the official Makey Makey using the Arduino IDE. The REV 1.2 board is built around the Microchip PIC 18F25K50. With the REV 1.2 reprogramming the microcontroller is no longer possible, and the functionality is now limited to keyboard and mouse emulation. REV 1.2 also drops the open source nature of the board design, and the new Makey Makey boards no longer can run stand-alone code. The newest 2017 version seems to be designed around a GPCE4096UA sound controller.

== Awards and recognition ==
- (2014) Inducted into The Museum of Modern Art's permanent collection
- (2014) Popular Science's "Best of Toy Fair"
