= Ballistic electron emission microscopy =

Scientific imaging technology

Ballistic electron emission microscopy or BEEM is a technique for studying ballistic electron transport through a variety of materials and material interfaces. BEEM is a three terminal scanning tunneling microscopy (STM) technique that was invented in 1988 at the Jet Propulsion Laboratory in Pasadena, California by L. Douglas Bell, Michael H. Hecht, and William J. Kaiser. The most popular interfaces to study are metal–semiconductor Schottky diodes, but metal–insulator–semiconductor systems can be studied as well.

When performing BEEM, electrons are injected from a STM tip into a grounded metal base of a Schottky diode. A small fraction of these electrons will travel ballistically through the metal to the metal– semiconductor interface where they will encounter a Schottky barrier. Those electrons with sufficient energy to surmount the Schottky barrier will be detected as the BEEM current. The atomic scale positioning capability of the STM tip gives BEEM nanometer spatial resolution. In addition, the narrow energy distribution of electrons tunneling from the STM tip gives BEEM a high energetic resolution (about 0.02 eV).
