= Michael H. Hecht =

American astronomer

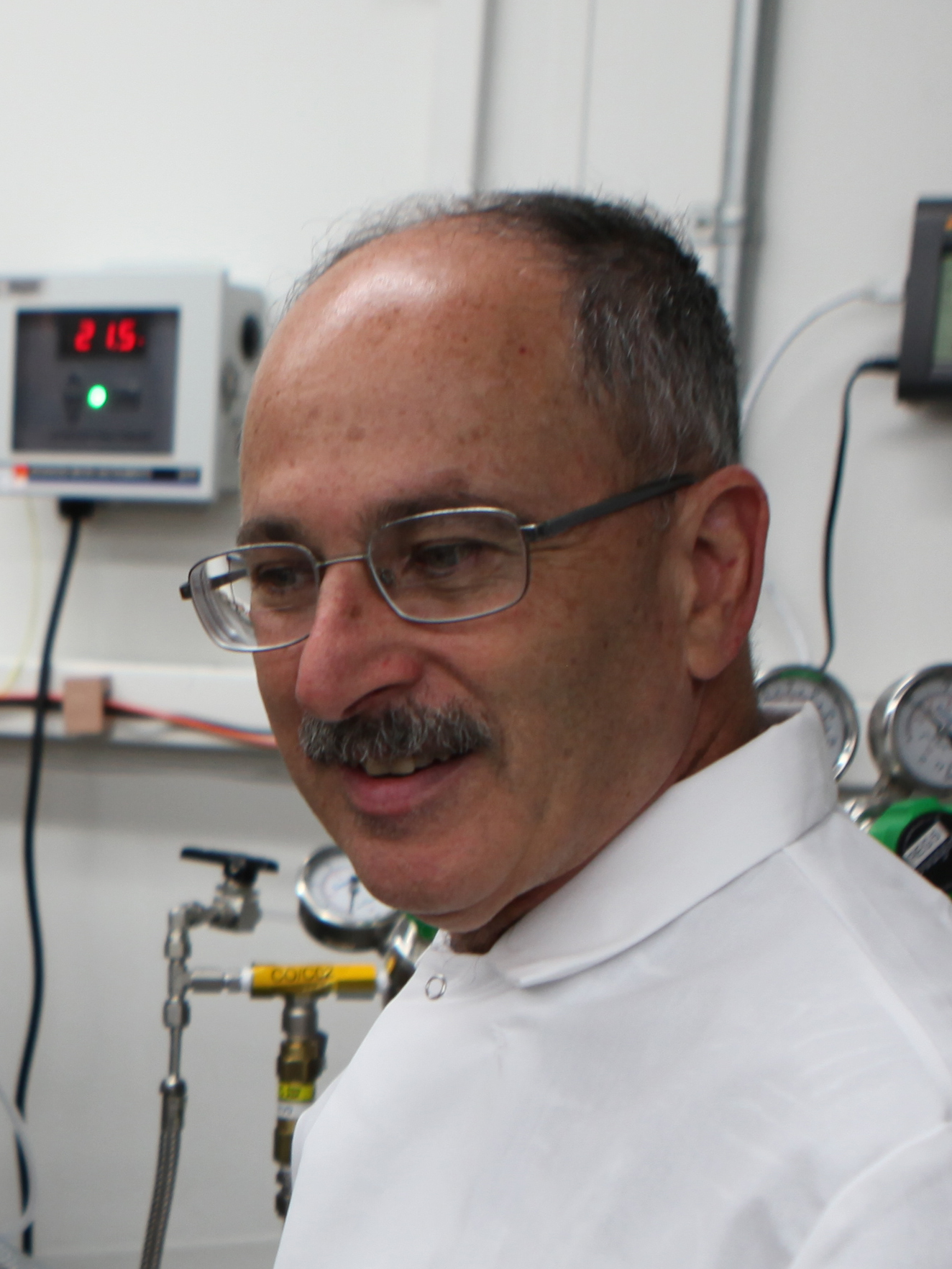
- Education: Princeton University, Massachusetts Institute of Technology, Stanford University
- Known for: Microscopy, Electrochemistry, and Conductivity Analyzer, Mars Oxygen ISRU Experiment, Event Horizon Telescope
- Awards: NASA Exceptional Achievement Medal, Breakthrough Prize in Fundamental Physics
- Scientific career
- Fields: Planetary Science, Surface Science
- Workplaces: Jet Propulsion Laboratory, Haystack Observatory
- Website: www.haystack.mit.edu/researcher/mike-hecht/

Michael H. Hecht is a research scientist, associate director for research management at the Massachusetts Institute of Technology's Haystack Observatory, and former deputy project director of the Event Horizon Telescope. He served as lead scientist for the Microscopy, Electrochemistry, and Conductivity Analyzer instrument on the Phoenix Mars lander, and as principal investigator for the Mars Oxygen ISRU Experiment (MOXIE) instrument on the Mars 2020 rover.

== Career ==
Hecht obtained an A.B. in Physics from Princeton University, an MS from the Massachusetts Institute of Technology, and a Ph.D. from Stanford University in 1982.

Hecht joined the staff of California Institute of Technology's Jet Propulsion Laboratory (JPL) in 1982, where he researched microelectromechanical systems, surface and interface science, scientific instrument development, and planetary science. He co-invented the Ballistic Electron Emission Microscopy system and published several highly-cited papers on metal-semiconductor interfaces, for which he received the newly-renamed Lew Allen Award for Excellence in 1990. At JPL, as the supervisor of the Microdevices Laboratory's In-Situ Exploration Technology Group, he developed the concept for the Deep Space 2 micro-landers, which flew to Mars in 1999. He was later named the project manager, co-investigator, and project scientist for the Mars Environmental Compatibility Assessment (MECA) instrument for the cancelled Mars Surveyor 2001 mission. The MECA instrument was later flown as the Microscopy, Electrochemistry, and Conductivity Analyzer on the Phoenix mission to Mars in 2007, with Hecht as lead scientist and co-investigator, and was instrumental in the discovery of perchlorate in Martian soil. Based on that work, Hecht published highly-cited papers on the chemistry of Martian soil and the existence of water on Mars, and was awarded the NASA Exceptional Achievement Medal in 2010.

After almost 30 years at JPL, Hecht was appointed as an associate director of MIT's Haystack Observatory. In 2014, the MOXIE instrument, for which Hecht is the principal investigator, was selected as one of the instruments on the Perseverance rover for the Mars 2020 mission. In 2019, Hecht was one of the scientists awarded the 2020 Breakthrough Prize in Fundamental Physics for his work with the Event Horizon Telescope to produce the first image of a supermassive black hole.
