= Kate Brandt =

American businessperson

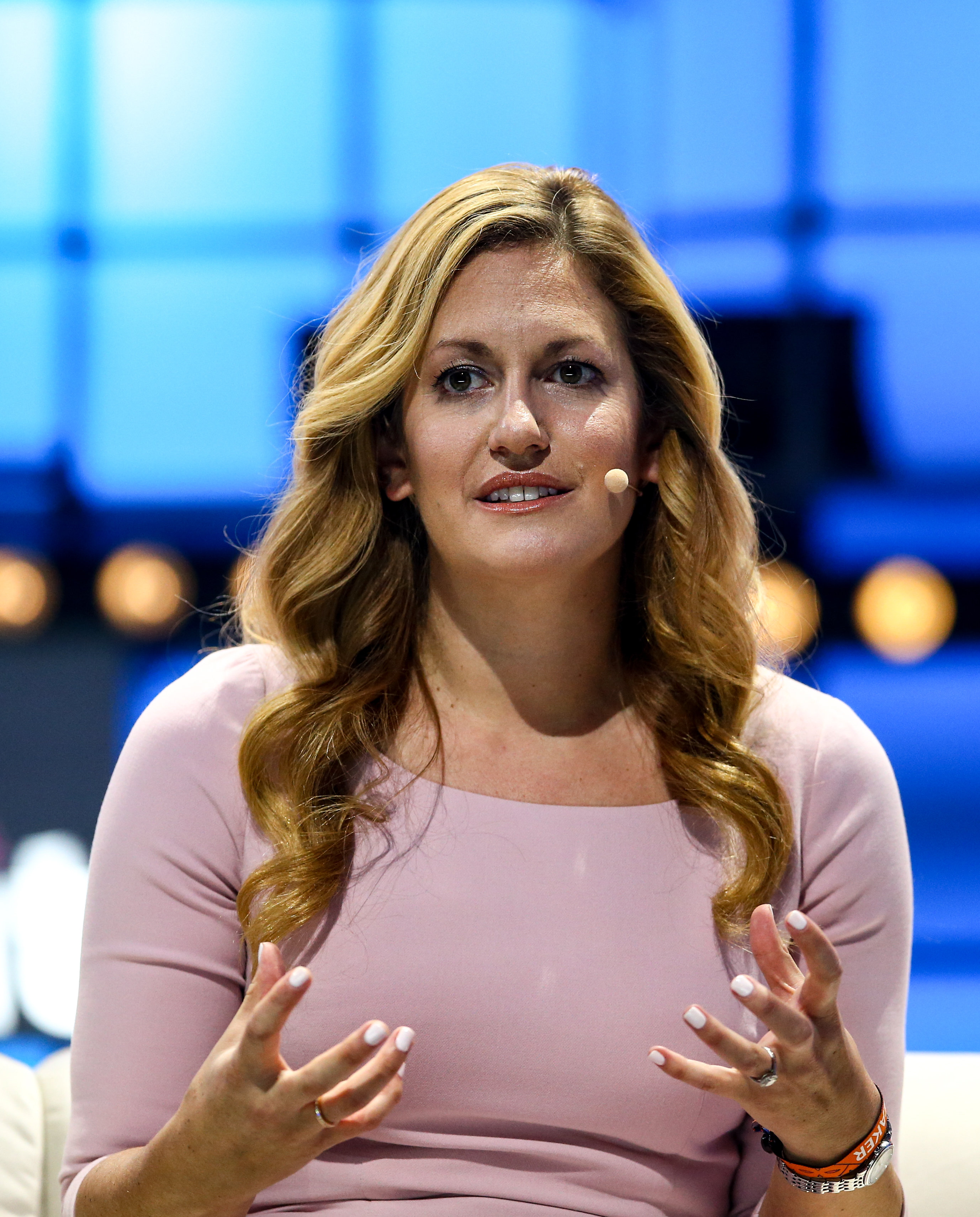
- Kate Brandt at Web Summit 2019
- Education: Brown University; University of Cambridge
- Occupation: Chief Sustainability Officer
- Employer: Google
- Awards: Navy Distinguished Public Service Award

Kate Brandt is an American businessperson, former government official, and the current Chief Sustainability Officer for Google. In 2014, she was appointed as the first Chief Sustainability Officer for the American federal government. Brandt is also the recipient of the Navy Distinguished Public Service Award, the highest recognition the Navy bestows upon a civilian.

== Early life and education ==
Brandt grew up in Muir Beach, a coastal town in California. She describes her parents as "earth-loving" and how she was raised to appreciate outdoor spaces. She cites early remembrances of land being developed into tract homes of teaching her to value nature preservation.

Brandt graduated from Brown University with honors in 2007. She later earned her master's degree in international relations from the University of Cambridge, where she graduated as a Gates Cambridge Scholar.

== Career ==
After graduation, Brandt worked for Barack Obama's 2008 presidential campaign as a deputy director in Florida. After his successful election, Brandt relocated to Washington, D.C., where she worked for the White House Office of Energy and Climate Change as a policy analyst. Brandt moved on to serve as energy adviser to Navy secretary Ray Mabus. Brandt also worked as the director of energy and the environment in the White House Office of Presidential Personnel as well as an adviser to the Department of Energy.

In 2014, President Obama named Brandt as America's first Chief Sustainability Officer, where she was responsible for improving the sustainability of the United States government's wide array of buildings and vehicles including annual purchases totaling $445 billion in goods and services.

Brandt went to work for Google in 2016, taking charge of their sustainability efforts. She was named as Google's Chief Sustainability Officer in 2018. In this role, Brandt is focused on Google's sustainability efforts ranging from "machine learning to help cool its data centers to smart thermostats that conserve home energy". Brandt is also responsible for aligning the multiple existing sustainability initiatives within the company, which she compares in scope to her previous responsibility of leading up sustainability across the federal government.

== Awards and honors ==
- In 2021, Fortune magazine named Brandt in their 40 Under 40 list
