= Jana Zaumseil =

German chemist and academic

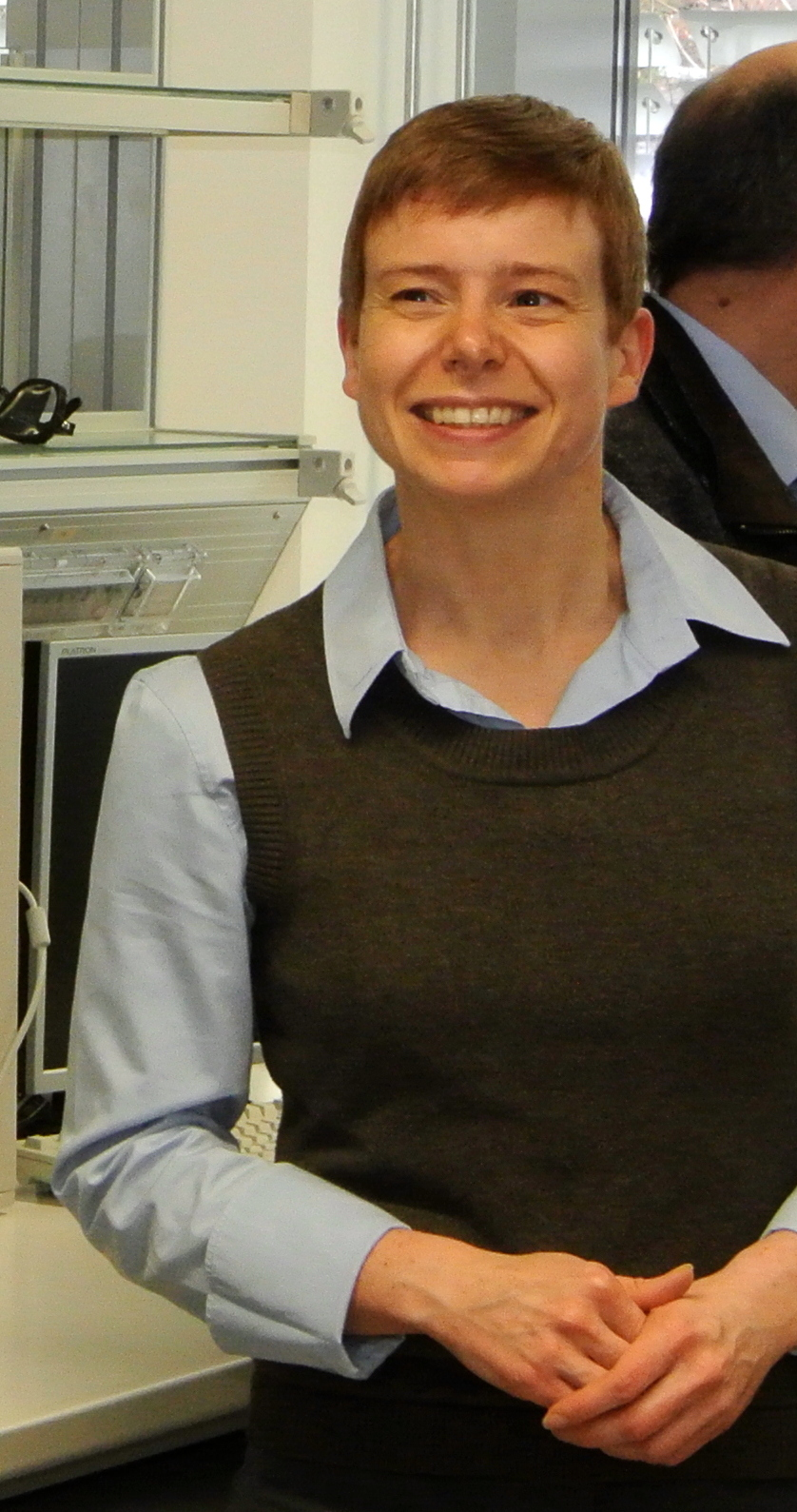
- Zaumseil at Heidelberg University in 2015
- Education: University of Cambridge; University of Leipzig
- Scientific career
- Workplaces: Heidelberg University; University of Erlangen-Nuremberg
- Thesis: N-channel, ambipolar and light-emitting polymer field-effect transistors (2007)

Jana Zaumseil (born 1977) is a German chemist who is a professor of physical chemistry at Heidelberg University. She serves as dean of the faculty of chemistry and earth sciences. Her research considers organic electronic materials for optoelectronics.

== Early life and education ==
Zaumseil was born in Jena and studied chemistry at Leipzig University. After earning her undergraduate degree, she joined Bell Labs and spent a year in Murray Hill, Manhattan, before moving to the Cavendish Laboratory. Zaumseil earned her doctorate at the University of Cambridge, where she worked with Henning Sirringhaus on ambipolar organic field effect transistors. She held a Gates Cambridge Scholarship. She was a postdoctoral fellow at the Argonne National Laboratory, based in the Center for Nanoscale Materials.

== Research and career ==
In 2009, Zaumseil moved to the University of Erlangen–Nuremberg. Shortly after arriving in Nuremberg she was awarded the Alfried-Krupp-Förderpreis. She started to work on plasmic nano antennas that could enhance the performance of light-emitting diodes. She was made a chair in physical chemistry at Heidelberg University.

Zaumseil was awarded a European Research Council Consolidator Grant in 2018.

== Selected publications ==
- Lay-Lay Chua; Zaumseil, Jana; Jui-Fen Chang; Eric C-W Ou; Peter K-H Ho; Sirringhaus, Henning; Friend, Richard (2005). "General observation of n-type field-effect behaviour in organic semiconductors". Nature. 434 (7030): 194–199. doi:10.1038/nature03376. PMID 15758994. Wikidata Q34401704.
- Zaumseil, Jana; Sirringhaus, Henning (2007). "Electron and Ambipolar Transport in Organic Field-Effect Transistors". Chemical Reviews. 107 (4): 1296–1323. doi:10.1021/cr0501543. PMID 17378616. Wikidata Q30054284.
- Vikram C Sundar; Zaumseil, Jana; Vitaly Podzorov; Etienne Menard; Robert L Willett; Takao Someya; Michael E Gershenson; John A Rogers (2004). "Elastomeric transistor stamps: reversible probing of charge transport in organic crystals". Science. 303 (5664): 1644–1646. doi:10.1126/science.1094196. PMID 15016993. Wikidata Q44797110.
