= Jessica Grahn =

American music neuroscientist

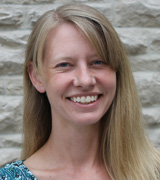
- Jessica Grahn, 2017

Academic background
- Education: BMus, Piano Performance, 1999, BA, Neuroscience, 1999, Northwestern University; PhD, 2005, Wolfson College, Cambridge
- Thesis: Behavioural and Functional Imaging Studies of Rhythm Processing (2005)
- Website: jessicagrahn.com

Jessica Adrienne Grahn is an American music neuroscientist. She is the director of the Human Cognitive and Sensorimotor Core of the University of Western Ontario's Brain and Mind Institute. During the COVID-19 pandemic, Grahn was named to the Royal Society of Canada's College of New Scholars, Artists and Scientists.

== Early life and education ==
Grahn completed her degrees in Neuroscience and Piano Performance from Northwestern University and her PhD from the University of Cambridge. Grahn was awarded the 2001 Gates Cambridge Scholarship to study in England.

== Career ==
Grahn left the Medical Research Council Cognition and Brain Sciences Unit at the University of Cambridge in 2010 when she was offered a position at the University of Western Ontario (UWO). At UWO, she established the Neuroscience and Music Lab at the Brain and Mind Institute with assistance from the Canada Foundation for Innovation Leaders Opportunity Fund in 2012. The British Science Association awarded Grahn with the Charles Darwin Award in Public Communication of Science. She also received an Ontario Early Researcher Award to "make new discoveries while helping to build their research teams." The Neuroscience and Music Lab was devised to study timing, rhythm and movement by understanding how the brain processes music. In the same year, Grahn was awarded a grant from the Grammy Foundation for her ongoing research in studying how the brain senses and reacts to music.

Grahn is interested in studying the Mozart Effect, and in 2014 she gave a talk at Western University of Health Sciences.

In 2015, Grahn was promoted to the rank of associate professor in the Department of Psychology and received the 2016 Faculty Scholars Award. The following year, she was elected a Fellow of the Association for Psychological Science. In 2018, Grahn and Robert Zatorre at McGill University were co-recipients of a McGill-Western Collaboration Grant to "create an auditory-oriented multimodal neuroimaging database, giving researchers access to neural circuitry data to test new hypotheses and serve as a baseline for studies involving disorders of hearing."

During the COVID-19 pandemic, Grahn was named to the Royal Society of Canada's College of New Scholars, Artists and Scientists.

In 2019 Jessica earned a Canada prize named "CRSNG"
