= Mary Fan =

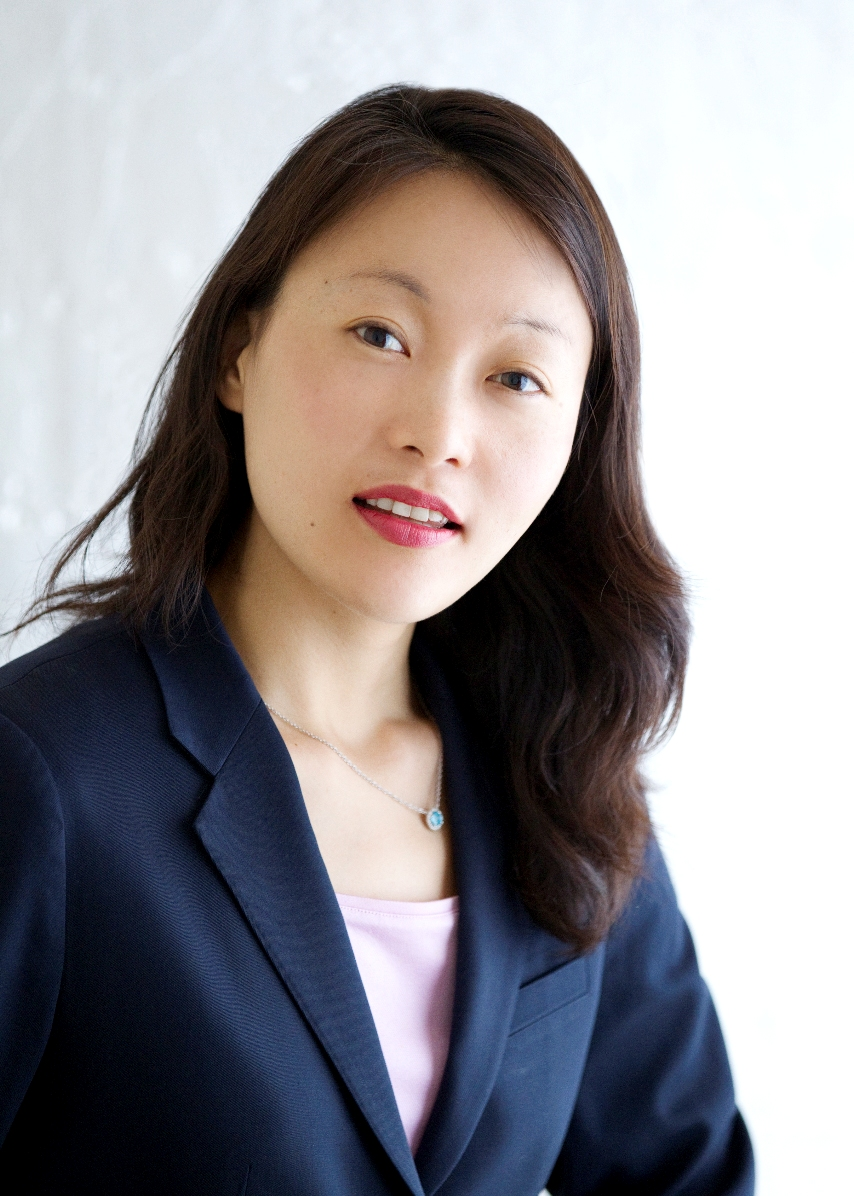
Mary Fan, Henry M. Jackson Professor of Law

Mary Fan is the Jack R. MacDonald Endowed Chair in Law at the University of Washington. She also is a core faculty member at Harborview Medical Center's Injury Prevention and Research Center, and part of the Firearms Injury and Policy Research Program team. Fan also was the Herman Phleger Visiting Professor at Stanford Law School, where she taught criminal law, and a visiting scientist at the Harvard School of Public Health. She is the author of the book Camera Power: Policing, Proof, Privacy, and Audiovisual Big Data, published by Cambridge University Press, and numerous articles.

== Professional ==
Fan was a federal prosecutor in the United States Attorney's Office for the Southern District of California. She also served as an Associate Legal Officer at the United Nations-established International Criminal Tribunal for the Former Yugoslavia (ICTY). She was a law clerk to Judge John T. Noonan Jr. of the United States Court of Appeals for the Ninth Circuit and to Judge O-Gon Kwon of the ICTY.

An elected member of the American Law Institute, Fan is an adviser to the Model Penal Code Sexual Assault and Related Offenses law reform project. Author of numerous articles in the areas of criminal law and procedure, crimmigration, evidence, and epidemiological criminology, Fan also is the coauthor with Antonio Cassese, Guido Acquaviva, and Alex Whiting of International Law: Cases and Commentary (Oxford University Press 2011).

== Education ==
Fan received her JD at Yale Law School where she won the Jewell Prize and the Nathan Burkan Prize for her publications. She obtained her MPhil at the University of Cambridge, where she was a Gates Cambridge Scholar. She obtained degrees in political science and journalism as a Flinn Scholar at the University of Arizona.
