= Jay Silver =

Jay Saul Silver is an electrical engineer and toy inventor from Cocoa Beach, Florida. Silver is the Founder and CEO of JoyLabz and MaKey MaKey and was the first-ever Maker Research Scientist at Intel.

== Academic background and early career ==
Silver earned his BA in electrical engineering from Georgia Tech, where he was named Engineer of the Year, and was awarded a Gates Scholarship to pursue his Master's from Cambridge University in Internet Technology. Funded by a National Science Foundation Fellowship, Silver earned a Master's from MIT's Media Lab, and went on to earn his PhD from MIT's Media Lab Lifelong Kindergarten. For his PhD on the topic of “World as Construction Kit,” Silver was awarded the Lemelson Prize for Inventiveness

Following his academic career, Silver invented Drawdio, which was named one of TIME Magazine's “Top 15 Toys for Young Geniuses” in 2011.

== Makey Makey ==
In 2012, Silver founded Makey Makey: An Invention Kit for Everyone – a toy that allows users to connect everyday objects (e.g. fruit, silverware) to computer programs – through a Kickstarter campaign that raised over $500,000. Following its initial funding on Kickstarter, MaKey Makey was written about in Mashable, Wired, and New Scientist, among others, and was named one of Popular Science's 2014 “Best of Toy Fair.”

== Charitable works and boards ==
Silver sits on the board of directors of Maker Ed, One Day on Earth, and the Transformative Tech Lab. Silver also works with teens at places like Not Back to School Camp.

== Awards and speakerships ==
- (2011), TIME Magazine's “Top 15 Toys for Young Geniuses” for Drawdio
- (2012) Lemelson Prize for Inventiveness
- (2012) Top 100 Inspirational World Changer by DELL
- (2014) Popular Science's "Best of Toy Fair" for Makey Makey
- Silver has spoken at numerous TED events
