= Lana Couch =

American aeronautical engineer

Lana Murphy Couch (1941–2007) was an American aeronautical engineer who headed the National Aero-Space Plane program at the Langley Research Center of NASA.

== Early life and education ==
Couch was born on November 27, 1941, in Smiths Grove, Kentucky, and moved as a child with her family to Martinsville, Indiana. She describes herself as a high school student as interested in mathematics, science, and science fiction. She majored in aeronautical engineering at Purdue University, graduating in 1963 as one of only two women in the major for that year.

== Career and later life ==
On graduating, Couch became a research engineer at the Langley Research Center of NASA; she remained at NASA for the rest of her career, shifting between Langley and NASA's headquarters. In 1975 she became head of the Structural Tunnels Section, part of a program to develop wind tunnels to test hypersonic aircraft. She became program manager for Fluid and Thermal Physics in 1980, manager for Spacecraft Systems Technology and In-Space Technology Experiments in 1983, manager in the National Aero-Space Plane program in 1985, and acting director of the Space Research and Technology Program in 1988. In 1990 she became the director of the National Aero-Space Plane Office at Langley.

She retired in 2003, as Langley's Associate Director for Business Management, and died on April 22, 2007.

== Recognition ==
Couch was a recipient of the 1986 NASA Exceptional Service Medal, the 1986 and 1988 Women in Aviation Award of the National Aeronautic Association, the 1989 Apollo 20th Anniversary Award of Women in Aerospace, the 1992 NASA Exceptional Achievement Medal, the 1993 Lifetime Achievement Award of Women in Aerospace, and the 1993 Senior Executive Service Presidential Rank Award.

She was named a distinguished engineering alumna of Purdue University in 1994, and a Fellow of the American Institute of Aeronautics and Astronautics in 1997.
