= NASA Exceptional Achievement Medal =

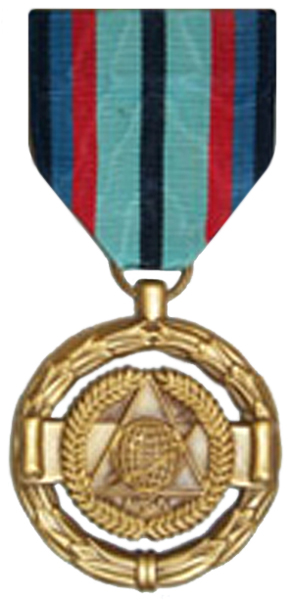
- Type: Medal
- Awarded for: "a significant, specific accomplishment or substantial improvement in operations, efficiency, service, financial savings, science, or technology which contributes to the mission of NASA."
- Country: United States
- Presented by: the National Aeronautics and Space Administration
- Eligibility: Government employees only
- Status: Active
- Established: 1991
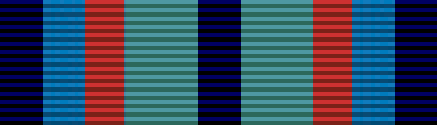
- NASA Exceptional Achievement Ribbon

Precedence
- Next (higher): Outstanding Leadership Medal
- Equivalent: Outstanding Service Medal (obsolete); Exceptional Service Medal
- Next (lower): Exceptional Achievement Medal; Exceptional Service Medal; Exceptional Scientific Achievement Medal; Exceptional Engineering Achievement Medal; Exceptional Technology Achievement Medal; Exceptional Administrative Achievement Medal; Equal Employment Opportunity Medal

The NASA Exceptional Achievement Medal is an award of the National Aeronautics and Space Administration established in 1991. The medal is awarded to both civilian members of NASA and military astronauts.

To be awarded the medal, a NASA employee must make substantial contributions characterized by a substantial and significant improvement in operations, efficiency, service, financial savings, science, or technology which directly contribute to the mission of NASA. For civilians, the decoration is typically bestowed to mid-level and senior NASA administrators who have supervised at least four to five successful NASA missions. Astronauts may be awarded the decoration after two to three space flights.

Due to its prestige, the medal is authorized as a military decoration for display on active duty military uniforms upon application from the service member to the various branch of the military in which they serve.

== Notable recipients ==
- Chris Adami, Jet Propulsion Laboratory, physicist
- Richard Arenstorf, Vanderbilt University, mathematician
- Gordon Cooper, astronaut
- Lana Couch (1992), NASA engineer and executive
- Carl Sagan, astronomer
- Alan Shepard, astronaut
- John Young, astronaut
- Kevin L. Petersen, NASA Dryden director
- Charles L. Bennett, observational astrophysicist
- Nancy Roman, astronomer, NASA executive
- Stephen P. Maran, astronomer

== Selected recipients by year ==
- Prem Chand Pandey, Jet Propulsion Laboratory, 1985 (NASA Certificate of Recognition and Cash Award)
- Gary Flandro, University of Tennessee, UTSI, 1998
- Miguel San Martín, Jet Propulsion Laboratory, 1998
- John R. Casani, Jet Propulsion Laboratory, 1999, 2000
- Mark P. Stucky, Armstrong Flight Research Center, Eclipse Project Technical Lead & Project Pilot, 1999
- Joan Feynman, Jet Propulsion Laboratory, 2002
- Adam Steltzner, Jet Propulsion Laboratory, 2004
- Carlos Ortiz Longo, Johnson Space Center, 2005
- Mian Chin, Goddard Space Flight Center, physical scientist, 2005
- Ashok Srivastava, Ames Research Center, Data Mining and Machine Learning, 2007
- Angelita Castro-Kelly, Mission Operations Manager, 2007

2010 Honorees:

- Michael H. Hecht, Jet Propulsion Laboratory, Research Scientist

2011 Honorees:

• Kevin D. James, Ames Research Center, Research

2013 Honorees:

- Kobie Boykins, Jet Propulsion Laboratory, Senior Mechanical Engineer
- David Y. Oh, Jet Propulsion Laboratory, Mars Science Laboratory Cross-Cutting Domain Lead

2019 Honorees:

- Rita M. Sambruna, NASA Headquarters

== See also ==
- List of NASA awards
