= John T. Noonan Jr. =

American judge (1926–2017)

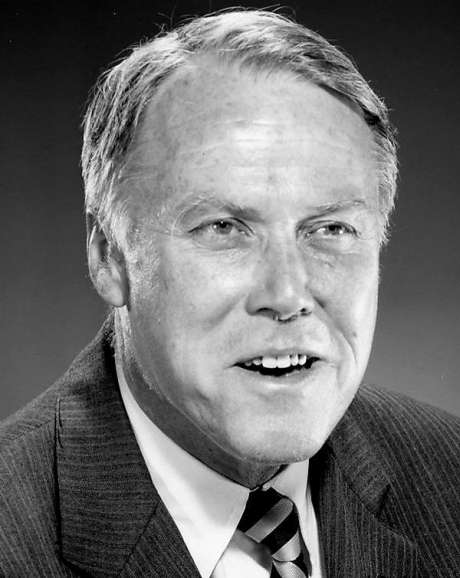

Senior Judge of the United States Court of Appeals for the Ninth Circuit
- In office December 27, 1996 – April 17, 2017

Judge of the United States Court of Appeals for the Ninth Circuit
- In office December 17, 1985 – December 27, 1996
- Appointed by: Ronald Reagan
- Preceded by: Seat established by 98 Stat. 333
- Succeeded by: Marsha Berzon

Personal details
- Born: John Thomas Noonan Jr. October 24, 1926 Boston, Massachusetts, U.S.
- Died: April 17, 2017 (aged 90) Berkeley, California, U.S.
- Spouse: Mary Lee Bennett (m. 1967)
- Children: 3
- Education: Harvard University (BA, LLB); St John's College, Cambridge; Catholic University of America (MA, PhD)

John Thomas Noonan Jr. (October 24, 1926 – April 17, 2017) was a United States circuit judge of the United States Court of Appeals for the Ninth Circuit.

== Personal and education ==
Born in Boston, Noonan entered Harvard University in 1944 and graduated summa cum laude two years later with a Bachelor of Arts in English.

While at Harvard he wrote for the Harvard Crimson and was elected to Phi Beta Kappa. After a year at St. John's College, Cambridge, Noonan matriculated at Catholic University of America, from which he received a Master of Arts in 1949 and a Doctor of Philosophy in 1951, both in philosophy. In 1954, he received a Bachelor of Laws from Harvard Law School, where he served on the Harvard Law Review. Noonan was married to art historian Mary Lee Noonan (née Bennett) from 1967 until his death. They had three children.

== Professional ==
From 1954 to 1955, Noonan worked as Special Staff to the United States National Security Council, assisting Robert Cutler, then the National Security Advisor. In 1955, Noonan entered private practice, working for the Boston law firm of Herrick & Smith. From 1958 to 1962, he served as Chairman of the Brookline, Massachusetts Redevelopment Authority, after defeating Michael Dukakis in an election.

In 1961, Noonan was invited to join the faculty at the Notre Dame Law School by the Reverend Theodore Hesburgh. Noonan was tenured there three years later. Noonan was appointed, largely on account of his book Contraception: A History of Its Treatment by the Catholic Theologians and Canonists (1965), as a historical consultant to the papal commission established by Pope Paul VI, whose recommendation to relax the ban on birth control was then overruled. In 1966, Noonan moved to Boalt Hall, the law school of the University of California, Berkeley, where he became Robbins Professor of Law Emeritus.

While at Berkeley, Noonan represented John Negre, a Catholic conscientious objector who insisted that the Church's just war theory forbade participation in the Vietnam War. Although Justice William O. Douglas initially ordered the Army not to ship out Negre, that stay was removed by the full U.S. Supreme Court on April 21, 1969. Noonan continued to file briefs, but, after hearing argument, the Supreme Court ruled against Negre in Gillette v. United States (1971).

Noonan was the 1984 recipient of the Laetare Medal, awarded annually since 1883 by Notre Dame University in recognition of outstanding service to the Roman Catholic Church through a distinctively Catholic contribution in the recipient's profession. Noonan has served as a consultant for several agencies in the Catholic Church, including Pope Paul VI's Commission on Problems of the Family, and the U.S. Catholic Conference's committees on moral values, law and public policy, law and life issues. He also has been director of the National Right to Life Committee.

== Federal judicial service ==
On October 16, 1985, President Ronald Reagan nominated Noonan to the newly created 27th seat on the United States Court of Appeals for the Ninth Circuit, created by 98 Stat. 333. Noonan was confirmed by United States Senate on December 16, 1985, and received his commission the following day. He took senior status on December 27, 1996 and served the Court until his death in 2017.

=== Law clerks ===
Noonan's former law clerks include United States District Judge Brian Morris, former White House Chief Ethics Counsel and University of Minnesota Professor Richard Painter, California Court of Appeal Justice Allison M. Danner, University of Washington Professor Mary Fan, Boston College Law School Professor Cathleen Kaveny, NPR host Ailsa Chang, poet and lawyer Monica Youn, and Dean of Washington University School of Law Nancy Staudt.

== Noteworthy rulings ==
- Lazo-Majano v. INS, 813 F.2d 1432 (9th Cir. 1987). Noonan, joined by Judge Harry Pregerson, held that Olimpia Lazo-Majano's abuser, a Salvadoran army sergeant who had repeatedly beaten, raped, and threatened her, had imputed to Lazo-Majano the political opinion that she was a subversive. Lazo-Majano had, therefore, suffered persecution on account of her political opinion, which entitled her to asylum. Noonan wrote:
  Even if she had no political opinion and was innocent of a single reflection on the government of her country, the cynical imputation of political opinion to her is what counts under both statutes. In deciding whether anyone has a well-founded fear of persecution or is in danger of losing life or liberty because of a political opinion, one must continue to look at the person from the perspective of the persecutor. If the persecutor thinks the person guilty of a political opinion, then the person is at risk.

At the 30th anniversary of the Harvard Immigration & Refugee Clinical Program, at which Noonan gave the keynote address, Harvard Law School Clinical Professor Deborah Anker noted that the Lazo-Majano decision had inspired all her work.

- EEOC v. Townley Eng'r & Mfg. Co., 859 F.2d 610 (9th Cir. 1988). The Ninth Circuit held that Townley Engineering and Manufacturing Company, a closely held corporation whose founders made a covenant with God that their business "would be a Christian, faith-operated business," could not require employees to attend prayer services. The company was indifferent to whether employees prayed: employees could, if they chose, wear earplugs, read, or sleep. Noonan dissented. Anticipating the Supreme Court of the United States's opinion in Burwell v. Hobby Lobby, 573 U.S. __ (2014), Noonan wrote:

The First Amendment, guaranteeing the free exercise of religion to every person within the nation, is a guarantee that Townley Manufacturing Company rightly invokes. Nothing in the broad sweep of the amendment puts corporations outside its scope. Repeatedly and successfully, corporations have appealed to the protection the Religious Clauses afford or authorize. Just as a corporation enjoys the right of free speech guaranteed by the First Amendment, so a corporation enjoys the right guaranteed by the First Amendment to exercise religion. The First Amendment does not say that only one kind of corporation enjoys this right. The First Amendment does not say that only religious corporations or only not-for-profit corporations are protected. The First Amendment does not authorize Congress to pick and choose the persons or the entities or the organizational forms that are free to exercise their religion. All persons--and under our Constitution all corporations are persons--are free. A statute cannot subtract from their freedom.

— Id. at 623 (citations omitted)

- Harris v. Vazquez, 901 F.2d 724 (9th Cir. 1990). Noonan stayed the execution of Robert Alton Harris, holding that a hearing should be held to determine whether Harris had received competent psychiatric assistance in his defense. Some lauded Noonan's ruling. The Los Angeles Times' editorial board wrote, "By granting convicted killer Robert Alton Harris a stay of execution Friday, Judge John Noonan of the U.S. Court of Appeals not only vindicated Americans' traditional confidence in the integrity of the federal bench but also demonstrated the difficulty of imposing a death sentence with complete confidence in its fairness." Others did not. California Governor George Deukmejian stated at a press conference that he "share[d] with most Californians disappointment and great frustration with the action taken by the Court." Ultimately, the Supreme Court of the United States ordered the Ninth Circuit to stop issuing stays of execution, see Miscellaneous Order, 503 U.S. 1000 (1992), and Harris was executed.
- United States v. Johnson, 956 F.2d 894 (9th Cir. 1992). Noonan held that a defendant was permitted to introduce battered woman's syndrome in an attempt to mitigate her sentence for a drug offense:
  Our own law recognizes that for a substantial period of time a brutal man may subject women to severe psychological stress such that they failed to escape or cry out for help when in a public place because they lacked sufficient ego strength, self-confidence and willpower when they were in the threatening shadow of [the man's] complete domination over them. ... [W]hat is required is for the fact-finder to determine whether, given the experience and psychological makeup of this defendant, she feared to leave her criminal ways and obeyed from fear the criminal who directed her conduct.
- Compassion in Dying v. Washington, 49 F.3d 586 (9th Cir. 1995). Noonan, joined by Judge Diarmuid O'Scannlain, reversed District Judge Barbara Jacobs Rothstein after she found Washington state law banning assisted suicide violated the Constitution's Due Process Clause. Noonan ended the opinion:
  Compassion, according to the reflections of Prince Myshkin, is "the most important, perhaps the sole law of human existence." Feodor Dostoevsky, The Idiot, 292 (Alan Myers, trans.) (1991). In the vernacular, compassion is trumps. No one can read the accounts of the sufferings of the deceased plaintiffs supplied by their declarations, or the accounts of the sufferings of their patients supplied by the physicians, without being moved by them. No one would inflict such sufferings on another or want them inflicted on himself; and since the horrors recounted are those that could attend the end of life anyone who reads of them must be aware that they could be attendant on his own death. The desire to have a good and kind way of forestalling them is understandably evident in the declarations of the plaintiffs and in the decision of the district court. Compassion is a proper, desirable, even necessary component of judicial character; but compassion is not the most important, certainly not the sole law of human existence. Unrestrained by other virtues, as The Idiot illustrates, it leads to catastrophe. Justice, prudence, and fortitude are necessary too. Compassion cannot be the compass of a federal judge. That compass is the Constitution of the United States. Where, as here in the case of Washington, the statute of a state comports with that compass, the validity of the statute must be upheld.

The case was reheard by the court sitting en banc—which, in an opinion by Judge Stephen Reinhardt, came to the opposite conclusion and affirmed the District court. The Ninth Circuit was then reversed by the Supreme Court of the United States unanimous in judgment in Washington v. Glucksberg (1997).

- United States v. Kyllo, 190 F.3d 1041 (9th Cir. 1999). Ninth Circuit Judge Michael Daly Hawkins, joined by Melvin T. Brunetti, held that the government's use of a thermal imager was not a "search" within the meaning of the Fourth Amendment to the United States Constitution. Noonan dissented. Comparing the thermal imager to a telescope, Noonan wrote that "[i]n each case the amplification of the senses by technology defeats the homeowner's expectation of privacy. The government is not entitled to defeat this expectation by technological means." Id. at 1048. In Kyllo v. United States (2001), the Supreme Court agreed with Noonan, and reversed by a 5–4 vote.
- United States v. Arizona, 641 F.3d 339 (9th Cir. 2011). The Ninth Circuit Judge Richard Paez, joined by Noonan and partially by Carlos Bea, upheld a decision by District Judge Susan Ritchie Bolton, which blocked parts of the Arizona SB 1070 law targeting immigrants. Concurring, Noonan wrote: "For those sympathetic to immigrants to the United States, it is a challenge and a chilling foretaste of what other states might attempt." That judgment was partially affirmed by the U.S. Supreme Court in Arizona v. United States (2012), by a vote of 5-3.
- United States v. Black et al., 733 F.3d 294 (9th Cir. 2013). The court affirmed the denial of defendants' motions to dismiss their convictions. The defendants had argued that in scripting from start to finish a reverse sting operation, the government had overreached. Noonan dissented, writing:
  Massively involved in the manufacture of the crime, the ATF's actions constitute conduct disgraceful to the federal government. It is not a function of our government to entice into criminal activity unsuspecting people engaged in lawful conduct; not a function to invent a fiction in order to bait a trap for the innocent; not a function to collect conspirators to carry out a script written by the government. As the executive branch of our government has failed to disavow this conduct, it becomes the duty of the judicial branch to refuse to accept these actions as legitimate elements of a criminal case in a federal court.

The majority, consisting of Judges Raymond Fisher and Susan Graber, denied defendants' petitions for rehearing en banc. Judge Stephen Reinhardt, joined by Chief Judge Alex Kozinski, dissented from the denial of rehearing en banc. Reinhardt wrote:

The Black cases require us to address the limits on how our government may treat its citizens. They pose the question whether the government may target poor, minority neighborhoods and seek to tempt their residents to commit crimes that might well result in their escape from poverty. Equally important, these cases force us to consider the continued vitality of the outrageous government conduct doctrine itself. The majority opinion decides all of these issues incorrectly. Further, despite its claims to the contrary, the majority's reasoning does virtually nothing to caution the government about overreaching. Instead, it sends a dangerous signal that courts will uphold law enforcement tactics even though their threat to values of equality, fairness, and liberty is unmistakable.

See United States v. Black et al., Nos. 11-10036, 11-10037, 11-10039, 11-10077 (9th Cir. May 2, 2014).

== Selected honors and awards ==
- Guggenheim Fellowship, 1965–66, 1979-80
- Holmes Lecture, Harvard Law School, 1972
- Fellow of the American Academy of Arts & Sciences, 1976
- Messenger Lectures, Cornell University, 1982
- Laetare Medal, University of Notre Dame, 1984
- College of Fellows, Dominican School of Philosophy and Theology, 2009
- Civitas Dei Medal, Villanova University, 2013

== Publications ==
Noonan was a prolific and wide-ranging author. To quote one commentator:

[Noonan] has written a number of important studies about the interaction of Catholic moral doctrine and law, including comprehensive studies concerning contraception, marriage and divorce, and abortion. ... He has written important studies of legal and judicial ethics, judicial and legal biography, the privilege against self-incrimination, American slave law, capital punishment, abortion, the legal and moral dimensions of physician-assisted suicide, the use of the constitutional convention as a means of amending the Constitution, marriage and family law, the emergence and development of an anti-bribery ethic, law reviews, legal philosophy, the Judiciary Act of 1789, and political affairs and theory.

Noonan's major publications include:

- The Scholastic Analysis of Usury (Harvard 1957) (ISBN 0-674-79170-3)
- Contraception: A History of Its Treatment by the Catholic Theologians and Canonists (Harvard 1968) (ISBN 0-674-16853-4)
- The Morality of Abortion: Legal and Historical Perspectives (Harvard 1970) (ISBN 0-674-58725-1) (editor)
- Power to Dissolve: Lawyers and Marriages in the Courts of the Roman Curia (Harvard 1972) (ISBN 0-674-69575-5)
- Persons and Masks of the Law: Cardozo, Holmes, Jefferson and Wythe as Makers of the Masks (California 1975) (ISBN 0-520-23523-1)
- A Private Choice: Abortion in America in the Seventies (Free Press 1979) (ISBN 0-02-923160-4)
- Bribes: The Intellectual History of a Moral Idea (California 1984) (ISBN 0-02-922880-8)
- The Antelope: The Ordeal of the Recaptured Africans in the Administrations of John Quincy Adams & James Monroe (California 1990) (ISBN 0-520-03319-1)
- Professional and Personal Responsibilities of the Lawyer (Foundation Press 1997) (ISBN 1-56662-962-4) (casebook editor, with Richard W. Painter)
- The Lustre of Our Country: The American Experience of Religious Freedom (California 1998) (ISBN 0-520-20997-4)
- Religious Freedom: History, Cases, and Other Materials on the Interaction of Religion and Government (Foundation Press 2001) (ISBN 1-56662-962-4) (casebook editor, with Edward McGlynn Gaffney)
- Narrowing the Nation's Power: The Supreme Court Sides with the States (California 2002) (ISBN 0-520-23574-6)
- A Church That Can And Cannot Change: The Development of Catholic Moral Teaching (Notre Dame 2005) (ISBN 0-268-03603-9)

Legal offices
Preceded by Seat established by 98 Stat. 333	Judge of the United States Court of Appeals for the Ninth Circuit; 1985–1996	Succeeded by Marsha Berzon
