= Johanna Hanink =

American classicist (born 1982)

- Born: 1982 (age 43–44)

Academic background
- Education: Cambridge University (PhD); UC Berkeley (MA); University of Michigan (BA)
- Thesis: (2011)

Academic work
- Discipline: Classics
- Institutions: Brown University
- Website: https://twitter.com/johannahan

Johanna Hanink is Professor of Classics at Brown University. She specialises in ancient Greek theater and performance and the cultural life and afterlife of ancient Athens. Hanink also serves as a contributor to Aeon Magazine, the Chronicle for Higher Education, and Eidolon.

== Career ==
Hanink was born in 1982 in Ashford, Connecticut. Hanink received her BA in classics at the University of Michigan, Ann Arbor in 2003 and a Gates Scholarship in 2006, followed by an MA in Latin at the University of California, Berkeley. She achieved her PhD in classics in 2011 at Queens' College, Cambridge.

Hanink's work focuses on Greek drama, and particularly Greek tragedy. In addition, Hanink is interested in Classical reception studies and especially the role Greek and Roman antiquity plays in modern political movements. Her 2017 book, The Classical Debt, examines the symbolic debt of Western civilization to Greece in light of the Greek financial crisis. Hanink also writes on issues of gender in academia.

== Selected publications ==
- The Classical Debt: Greek Antiquity in an Era of Austerity, Harvard University Press, 2017. ISBN 9780674978300.
- Lycurgan Athens and the Making of Classical Tragedy, Cambridge University Press, Cambridge Classical Studies series, 2014. ISBN 9781107062023.
- Creative Lives in Classical Antiquity: Poets, Artists and Biography, co-edited with Richard Fletcher, Cambridge University Press, Cambridge Classical Studies series, 2016. ISBN 9781316670651.
