= Richard Arenstorf =

American mathematician (1929–2014)

Richard F. Arenstorf
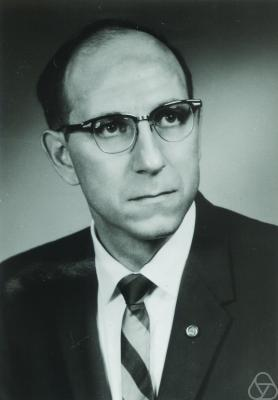
- Arenstorf in 1966
- Born: November 7, 1929; Hamburg, Germany
- Died: September 18, 2014 (aged 84); Nashville, Tennessee, U.S.
- Citizenship: American
- Education: University of Göttingen; University of Mainz
- Known for: Arenstorf Orbit
- Awards: NASA Exceptional Scientific Achievement Medal (1966)
- Scientific career
- Fields: Mathematics
- Workplaces: Vanderbilt University

Richard F. Arenstorf (November 7, 1929 – September 18, 2014) was an American mathematician. He discovered a stable orbit between the Earth and the Moon, called an Arenstorf Orbit. It was the basis of the orbit used by the Apollo Program for going to the Moon.

Arenstorf received his Ph.D. from the Johannes Gutenberg University of Mainz in 1956.

== Arenstorf orbit ==
At the time when the United States was attempting to go to the Moon, no solution was known for orbiting regularly around two objects, such as a spacecraft traveling between the Earth and the Moon. This is a special case of the three-body problem, for which a general analytical solution is not known. However, the case of an Earth-Moon satellite can be simplified to four interactions (from the usual 6), because although the three objects gravitationally pull on each other, the effect of the spacecraft's gravity upon the motion of the vastly more massive Earth and Moon is negligible.

Arenstorf found a stable orbit for a spacecraft orbiting between the Earth and Moon, shaped like an "8" with the Earth or Moon located inside the loops of the "8". For a permanent presence on the Moon, it would be the path of what Arenstorf calls a "Space Bus", a ferry that could periodically transport supplies and people between the Earth and Moon without directly expending fuel. By staying on the Arenstorf orbit, lunar astronauts could efficiently return to Earth. Before leaving NASA after the first Moon landing, Arenstorf mapped out an emergency rescue orbit. This orbit was used in the Apollo 13 incident, in which a catastrophic malfunction aborted the Moon landing, but the astronauts ultimately returned to Earth without a major course adjustment.

=== Professor ===
After leaving NASA, Arenstorf became a professor of mathematics at Vanderbilt University, where he specialized in celestial mechanics and analytic number theory. One of his specialties in number theory was the properties of the Riemann zeta function, which allows generalizations to be made about the nature of prime numbers.

== Recognition ==
Arenstorf's portrait is found among Johannes Kepler's and Isaac Newton's in the "Museum" beginning the book Foundations of Mechanics by Ralph Abraham.

Arenstorf received the NASA Exceptional Achievement Medal in 1966.

== Popular culture ==
In the movie Apollo 13, a sketch of the Arenstorf orbit is drawn on a chalkboard and referred to throughout the movie to mark the progress and dangers of the imperiled astronauts.

== Death ==
He died of heart failure on September 18, 2014, in Nashville, Tennessee.
