= Angelita Castro-Kelly =

American physicist (1942–2015)

Angelita Castro Kelly
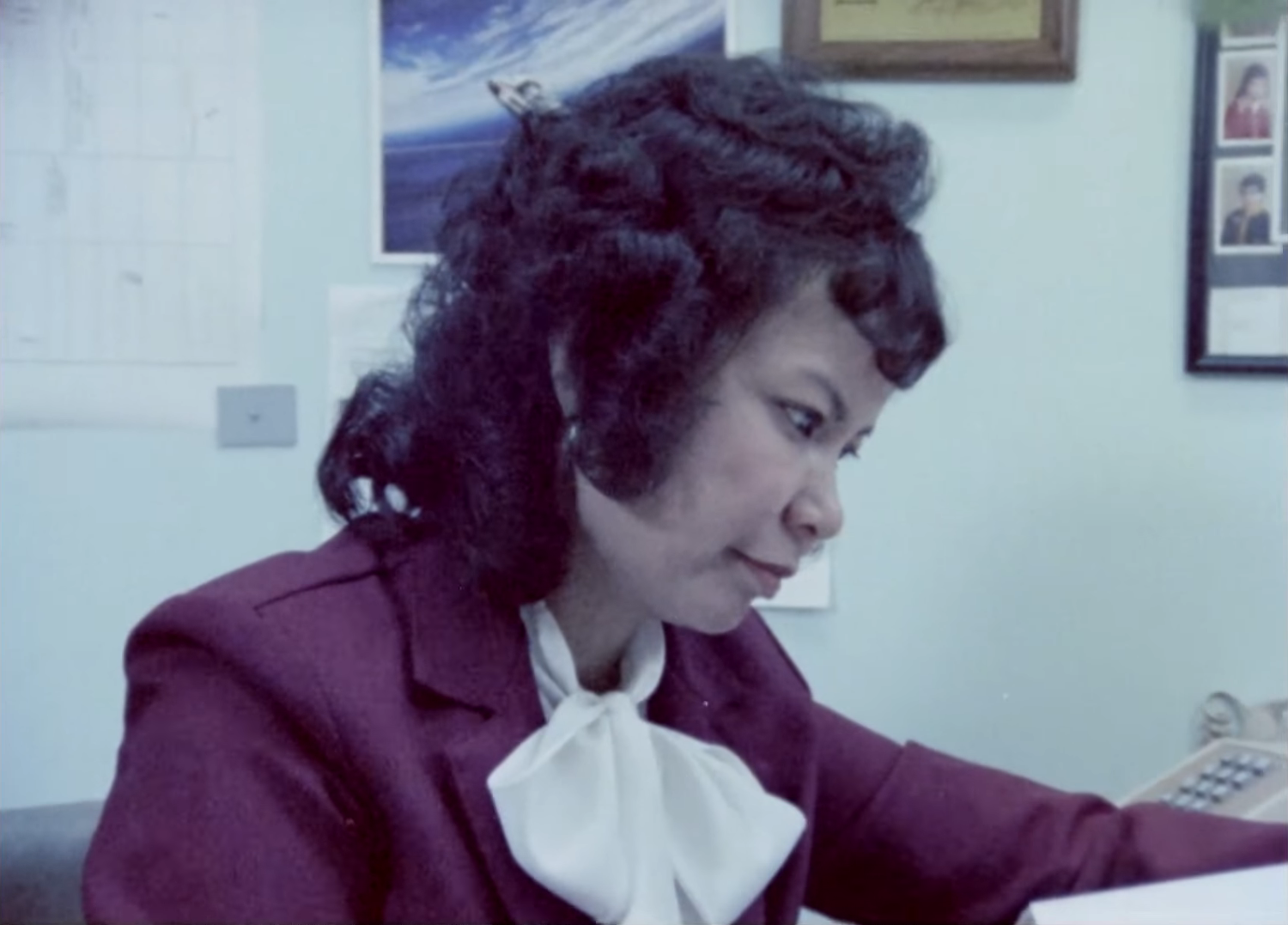
- Angelita Kelly, c. 1981
- Born: Angelita Albano Castro; August 26, 1942; Jones, Isabela, Philippines
- Died: June 7, 2015 (aged 72)
- Education: University of Santo Tomas; University of Maryland
- Spouse: Dr. Francis Kelly
- Scientific career
- Workplaces: NASA

Angelita Castro Kelly (born Angelita Albano Castro, August 26, 1942 - June 7, 2015) was a space scientist and physicist. She is the first female Mission Operations Manager (MOM) of NASA. She spearheaded and supervised the Earth Observing System missions during its developmental stage.

Castro was born in Jones, Isabela in 1942, but she grew up in Sampaloc, Manila. Her mother was pharmacist Eufemia Albano and her father was Dr. Miguel Castro, who served as Captain of United States Army Forces in the Far East until he was killed in World War II. She was the youngest of seven children.

When she moved to the US to pursue her education, she met fellow physicist Dr. Francis Kelly whom she eventually married.

== Education ==
Castro was reportedly very active in school activities, such as debates, quizzes, contests, and student organizations. In 1962, she acquired a bachelor's degree in Mathematics and Physics at the University of Santo Tomas where she graduated summa cum laude. Afterwards, she moved to the US to further her education. She obtained a master's degree in physics from the University of Maryland.

== NASA ==
Castro worked at NASA for 37 years, from 1977 to 2015. In 1977, she began as a data analyst of the team that planned and executed the Goddard Space Flight Center (GSFC) Spacelab Data Processing Facility (SLDPF). The SPDF is a core space shuttle mission that aims to investigate microgravity, solar physics, crystal growth, and other scientific inquiries. In 1990, she became the first female Mission Operations Manager of the Earth Observing System (EOS) project. It was a vital constituent of the Earth Science Enterprise program of NASA. She supervised the developmental stage of the three EOS missions: terra, aqua, and aura. Castro developed the operations concept of EOS, containing the EOS memoranda, among others. It became the basis of all EOS missions. Half of her 12 years service to NASA, she served a dual role as she also became the Earth Science Constellation Manager.

Working in a room full of men, Castro recounted initially experiencing hostility from a few coworkers until she garnered their trust and respect by showing she is as adept and capable.

== Death ==
Castro suffered lupus until she succumbed to its complications on June 7, 2015. She was 73.

== Awards ==
In 2006, Castro was granted the Goddard Space Flight Center Exceptional Service Award. In 2007, 2008, and 2009, she received the NASA Exceptional Achievement Medal. She is also a recipient of the Austronauts' Manned Flight Program Launch Honoree, Astronauts’ Manned Flight “Snoopy” Award, Flight Project's “Mission Impossible” award, GSFC Exceptional Performance Award, and NASA Honor Group Achievement Award for the Constellation Mission Operations Working Group. In 2013, Castro received NASA's Outstanding Leadership Medal.
