= Culture and Psychology =

- Discipline: Cultural psychology
- Language: English
- Edited by: Kevin Carriere

Publication details
- History: 1995-present
- Publisher: SAGE Publishing
- Frequency: Quarterly
- Impact factor: 0.9 (2024)

Standard abbreviations
- ISO 4: Cult. Psychol.

Indexing
- CODEN: CUPSFQ
- ISSN: 1354-067X (print); 1461-7056 (web)
- OCLC no.: 610269364

Links
- Journal homepage; Online access; Online archive

Culture and Psychology is a quarterly peer-reviewed academic journal that publishes papers in the field of psychology. The journal's editor-in-chief is Kevin Carriere. It was established in 1995 and is published by SAGE Publishing.

== Abstracting and indexing ==
The journal is abstracted and indexed in Scopus and the Social Sciences Citation Index. According to the Journal Citation Reports, the journal has a 2024 impact factor of 0.9.
