= Paul Wine =

American chemist

Paul Wine is an American chemist currently at Georgia Tech and an Elected Fellow of the American Association for the Advancement of Science and American Chemical Society.
