= Carol Ibe =

Nigerian microbiologist

- Ibe in 2025
- Born: Madison, Wisconsin
- Education: Georgetown University; University of Oxford; University of Cambridge
- Occupation: Molecular Biologist
- Known for: Founded the JR Biotek Foundation

Carol Nkechi Ibe (born in Madison, Wisconsin) is a Nigerian - American molecular biologist. She founded the JR Biotek Foundation. She was a Bill Gates Sr. prize winner in 2019. Her research focuses on gene function during wheat infection by wheat yellow rust.

== Career ==
Ibe was born in the United States, but grew up in Nigeria. She completed an undergraduate degree in Nigeria, but postgraduate study at Georgetown University in Washington, D.C. During this time, in 2013, she founded JR Biotek, a life science education company.

She studied for a Master's degree at the University of Oxford, before doing a PhD at the University of Cambridge, where she now works.

== Awards and honours ==
Ibe was a finalist for the 2017 WISE World Award. In 2019, Ibe was awarded the Cambridge University Society for the Application of Research (CSAR) Award, where she was one of 12 winners (out of more than 200 entries) and the first black student to win the award.

She was a Bill Gates Sr. prize winner in 2019.
