= William J. Kaiser =

American academic (born 1955)

William Joseph Kaiser (born September 15, 1955) is a professor and former department chair of Electrical Engineering at the University of California, Los Angeles (UCLA). He is a winner of 2007 Gold Shield Prize and has been a Fellow of American Vacuum Society since 1994. He is the director of Actuated Sensing & Coordinated Embedded Networked Technologies research group at UCLA and co-director of UCLA Wireless Health Institute.

== Biography ==
Kaiser received a PhD in Solid State Physics from Wayne State University in 1984. From 1977 through 1986, as a member of Ford Motor Co. Research Staff, his development of automotive sensor and embedded system technology resulted in large volume commercial sensor production. At Ford, he also developed the first spectroscopies based on scanning tunneling microscopy. From 1986 through 1994, at the Jet Propulsion Laboratory, Dr. Kaiser developed and demonstrated the first electron tunnel sensors for acceleration and infrared detection and initiated the NASA/JPL microinstrument program.

In 1994, Kaiser joined the faculty of the UCLA Electrical Engineering Department. At UCLA, he initiated the distributed networked embedded sensor field via many large collaborative programs across several departments. These combined UCLA research activities have now lead to the creation of many new programs within DARPA, NSF, NASA, and in commercial technology corporations. He served as Electrical Engineering Department Chairman from 1996 through 2000. Dr. Kaiser has over 100 publications, 100 invited presentations and 21 patents. He has received the Allied Signal Faculty Research Award, the Peter Mark Award of the American Vacuum Society, the NASA Medal for Exceptional Scientific Achievement, the Arch Colwell Best Paper Award of the Society of Automotive Engineers, and two R&D 100 Awards. In 2019, he became an elected Fellow of IEEE.

== Research interests ==
Kaiser's research has concentrated on the development of distributed networked, embedded computing for linking the Internet to the physical world. The applications for this technology that his group has pursued include distributed systems for factory automation, biomedical research, healthcare, space science, security, and defense. His background includes distributed low-power system development, low-power analog and digital electronics, low-power wireless communication systems, and microsensor technology. Kaiser's teaching efforts include the development of new courses for both undergraduate and graduate programs emphasizing a combination of fundamental concepts and applications to design.
