= Scroll compressor =

Air compressor

Mechanism of a scroll pump; here two archimedean spirals

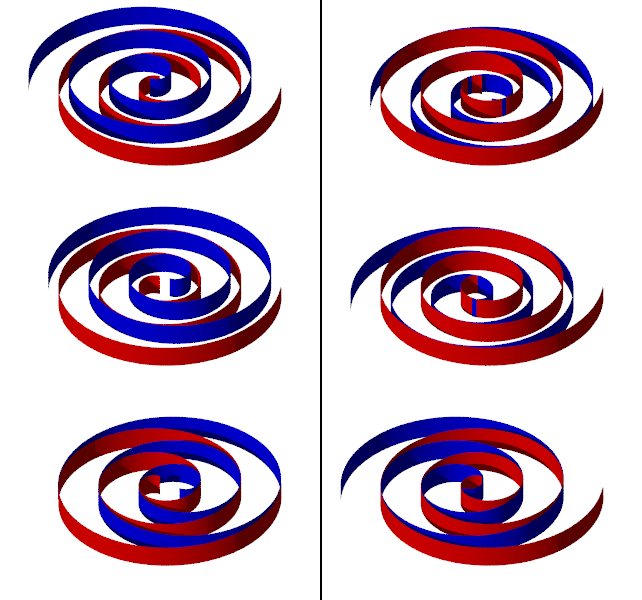
Operation of a scroll compressor

A scroll compressor (also called spiral compressor, scroll pump and scroll vacuum pump) is a device for compressing air or refrigerant. It is used in air conditioning equipment, as an automobile supercharger (where it is known as a scroll-type supercharger) and as a vacuum pump. Many residential central heat pump and air conditioning systems and a few automotive air conditioning systems employ a scroll compressor instead of the more traditional rotary, reciprocating, and wobble-plate compressors.

A scroll compressor operating in reverse is a scroll expander, and can generate mechanical work.

== History ==
Animation of a spinning scroll compressor

Léon Creux first patented a scroll compressor in 1905 in France and the US. Creux invented the compressor as a rotary steam engine concept, but the metal casting technology of the period was not sufficiently advanced to construct a working prototype, since a scroll compressor demands very tight tolerances to function effectively. In the 1905 patent, Creux defines a co-orbiting or spinning reversible steam expander driven by a fixed radius crank on a single shaft. However, the scroll expander engine could not overcome the machining hurdles of radial compliance inherent to achieving efficiency in scroll operation that would not be adequately addressed until the works of Niels Young in 1975. The first practical scroll compressors did not appear on the market until after World War II, when higher-precision machine tools enabled their construction. In 1981, Sanden began manufacturing the first commercially available scroll compressors for automobile air conditioners. They were not commercially produced for room air conditioning until 1983 when Hitachi launched the world's first air conditioner with a hermetic scroll compressor.

== Design ==
A scroll compressor uses two interleaving scrolls to pump, compress or pressurize fluids such as liquids and gases. The vane geometry may be involute, Archimedean spiral, or hybrid curves.

Often, one of the scrolls is fixed, while the other orbits eccentrically without rotating, thereby trapping and pumping or compressing pockets of fluid between the scrolls. An eccentric shaft can provide the orbital motion but the scroll must be prevented from rotating, typically with an Oldham-type coupling, additional eccentric idler shafts, or a bellows joint (particularly for high-purity applications). Another method for producing the compression motion is co-rotating the scrolls, in synchronous motion, but with offset centers of rotation. The relative motion is the same as if one were orbiting.

Leaks from axial gaps are prevented by the use of spiral-shaped tip seals, placed into grooves on the tips of both spirals. These tip seals also help lower the friction and can be replaced when worn down. Some compressors use the pressurized discharge gas to push both scrolls together, eliminating the need for tip seals and improving sealing with use; these compressors are said to wear-in instead of wear-out.

== Engineering comparison to other pumps ==
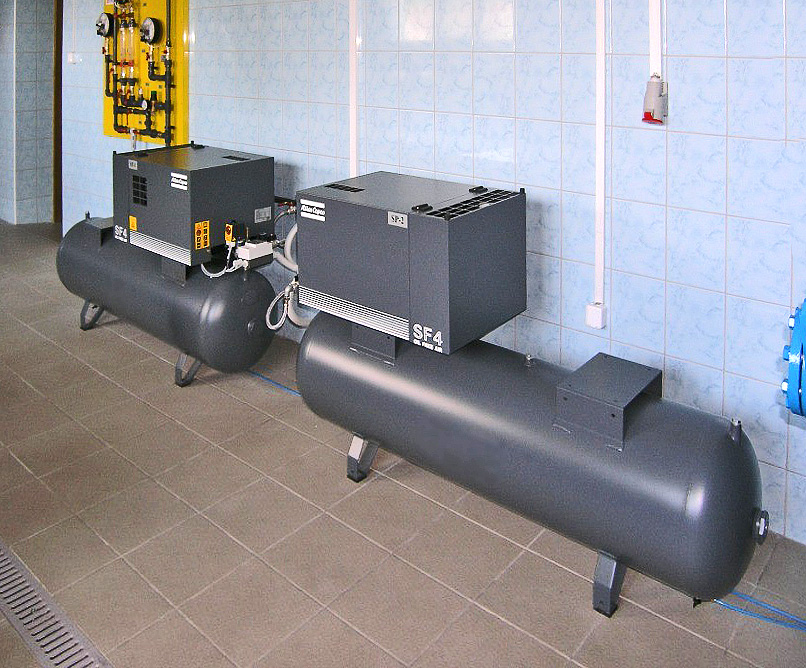
Scroll compressors with air tanks

These devices are known for operating more smoothly, quietly, and reliably than conventional compressors in some applications.

=== Rotations and pulse flow ===
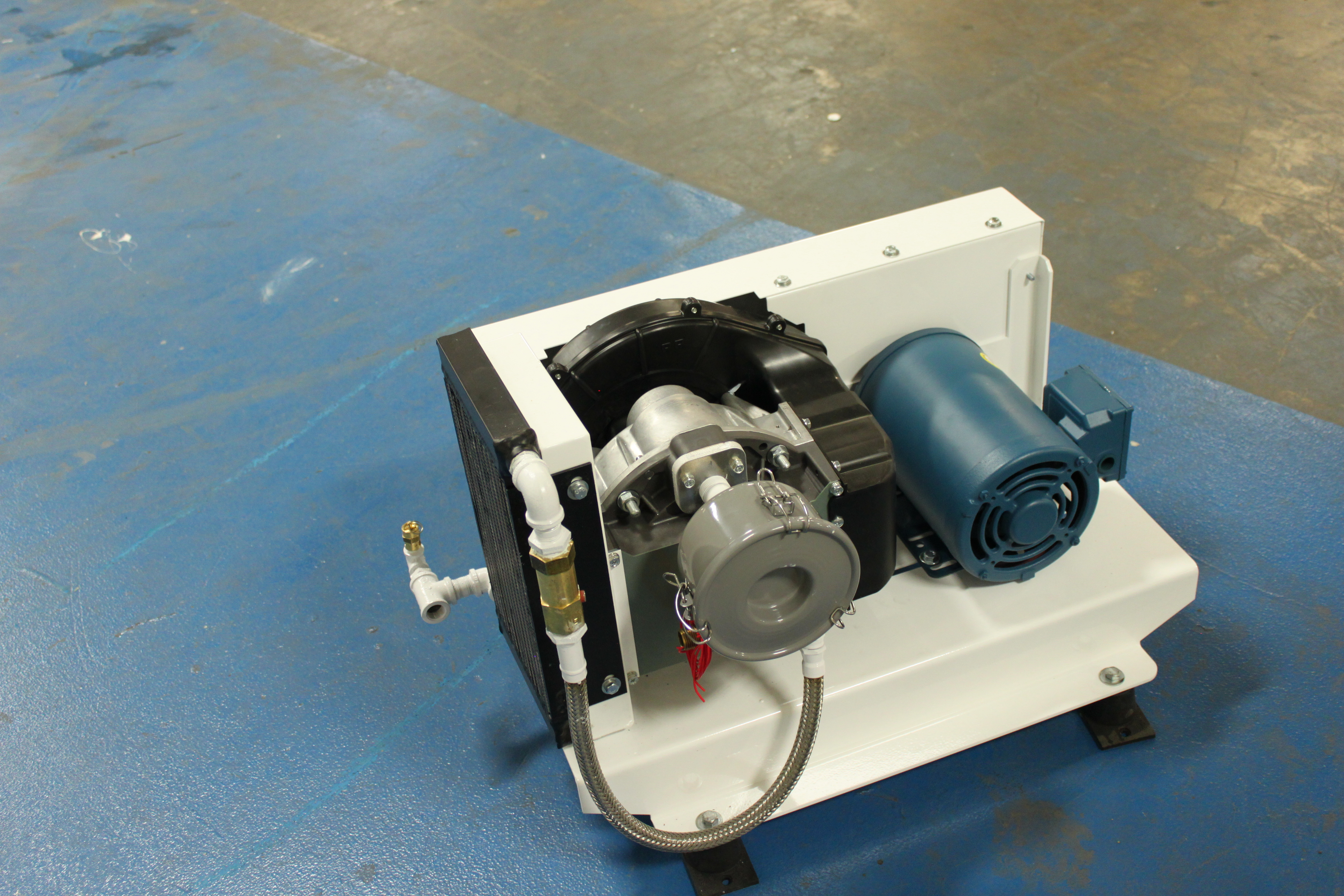
Open-type scroll compressor

The compression process occurs over approximately 2 to 2½ rotations of the crankshaft, compared to one rotation for rotary compressors, and one-half rotation for reciprocating compressors. The scroll discharge and suction processes occur for a full rotation, compared to less than a half-rotation for the reciprocating suction process, and less than a quarter-rotation for the reciprocating discharge process. Reciprocating compressors have multiple cylinders (typically, anywhere from two to six), while scroll compressors only have one compression element. The presence of multiple cylinders in reciprocating compressors reduces suction and discharge pulsations. Therefore, it is difficult to state whether scroll compressors have lower pulsation levels than reciprocating compressors as has often been claimed by some suppliers of scroll compressors. The more steady flow yields lower gas pulsations, lower sound and lower vibration of attached piping, while having no influence on the compressor operating efficiency.

=== Valves ===
Scroll compressors never have a suction valve, but depending on the application may or may not have a discharge valve. The use of a dynamic discharge valve is more prominent in high pressure ratio applications, typical of refrigeration. Typically, an air-conditioning scroll does not have a dynamic discharge valve. The use of a dynamic discharge valve improves scroll compressor efficiency over a wide range of operating conditions, when the operating pressure ratio is well above the built-in pressure ratio of the compressors. If the compressor is designed to operate near a single operating point, then the scroll compressor can actually gain efficiency around this point if there is no dynamic discharge valve present (since there are additional discharge flow losses associated with the presence of the discharge valve as well as discharge ports tend to be smaller when the discharge is present).

=== Efficiency ===
The isentropic efficiency of scroll compressors is slightly higher than that of a typical reciprocating compressor when the compressor is designed to operate near one selected rating point. The scroll compressors are more efficient in this case because they do not have a dynamic discharge valve that introduces additional throttling losses. However, the efficiency of a scroll compressor that does not have a discharge valve begins to decrease as compared to the reciprocating compressor at higher pressure ratio operation. This is a result of under-compression losses that occur at high pressure ratio operation of the positive displacement compressors that do not have a dynamic discharge valve.

The scroll compression process is nearly 100% volumetrically efficient in pumping the trapped fluid. The suction process creates its own volume, separate from the compression and discharge processes further inside. By comparison, reciprocating compressors leave a small amount of compressed gas in the cylinder, because it is not practical for the piston to touch the head or valve plate. That remnant gas from the last cycle then occupies space intended for suction gas. The reduction in capacity (i.e. volumetric efficiency) depends on the suction and discharge pressures with greater reductions occurring at higher ratios of discharge to suction pressures.

=== Size ===
Scroll compressors tend to be very compact and smooth running and so do not require spring suspension. This allows them to have very small shell enclosures which reduces overall cost but also results in smaller free volume.

== Reliability ==
Scroll compressors have fewer moving parts than reciprocating compressors which, theoretically, should improve reliability. According to Emerson Climate Technologies, manufacturer of Copeland scroll compressors, scroll compressors have 70 percent fewer moving parts than conventional reciprocating compressors.

At least one manufacturer found through testing that the scroll compressor design delivered better reliability and efficiency in operation than reciprocating compressors.

== Scroll expander ==
The scroll expander is a work-producing device used mostly in low-pressure heat recovery applications. It is essentially a scroll compressor working in reverse; high enthalpy working fluid or gas enters the discharge side of the compressor and rotates the eccentric scroll before discharging from the compressor inlet. The basic modification required to convert the scroll compressor to a scroll expander is to remove the non-return valve from the compressor discharge.

== See also ==
- Compressed air battery
