= Awards and decorations of the National Aeronautics and Space Administration =

American aeronautics and space awards

The National Aeronautics and Space Administration (NASA) is an independent agency of the US federal government responsible for the United States' civil space program and for research in aeronautics and space exploration. Like most U.S. government agencies, it is authorized to create awards and decorations for its employees, U.S. citizens and foreign nationals who have shown exceptional service to accomplishing the agency's goals.

The National Advisory Committee for Aeronautics (NACA) was a United States federal agency that was founded on March 3, 1915, to undertake, promote, and institutionalize aeronautical research. On October 1, 1958, the agency was dissolved and its assets and personnel were transferred to the newly created National Aeronautics and Space Administration (NASA). NACA created two awards in 1954 to recognize the distinguished/exceptional service of NACA employees. The medals are similar with the seal of NACA as the medal device and were approved by President Eisenhower in 1953. Only seven medals were awarded between 1954 and 1958 when NACA was transferred into NASA.

Congressional Space Medal of Honor	NASA Distinguished Service Medal, Type I (1958-1964)	NASA Distinguished Service Medal	NASA Distinguished Public Service Medal	NASA Outstanding Leadership Medal	NASA Exceptional Achievement Medal
NASA Exceptional Service Medal, Type I	NASA Exceptional Service Medal	NASA Exceptional Scientific Achievement Medal	NASA Exceptional Engineering Achievement Medal	NASA Exceptional Technology Achievement Medal	NASA Exceptional Administrative Achievement Medal
NASA Equal Employment Opportunity Medal	NASA Exceptional Bravery Medal	NASA Public Service Medal	NASA Space Flight Medal	NASA Exceptional Public Achievement Medal	NASA Early Career Achievement Medal
NASA Silver Achievement Medal	NASA Space Exploration Medal	NACA Distinguished Service Medal (obsolete)	NACA Exceptional Service Medal (obsolete)		
