= Ann Douglas =

Ann(e) or Annie Douglas may refer to:

- Anne Douglas, Countess of Morton (c. 1610–1654), English noblewoman
- Anne Ingram, Viscountess Irvine (c.1696–1764), English poet and wife of Colonel William Douglas
- Anne Buydens (1919–2021), German-American film producer and wife of actor Kirk Douglas
- Ann Douglas (historian), American academic
- Annie Douglas Richards, fictional character on the American soap opera Sunset Beach

== See also ==
- Anne Douglas Sedgwick, American-born British writer
- Anne R. Douglass, atmospheric physicist
- Anna Murray Douglass (1813–1882), American abolitionist
