= Giada Arney =

American astrobiologist

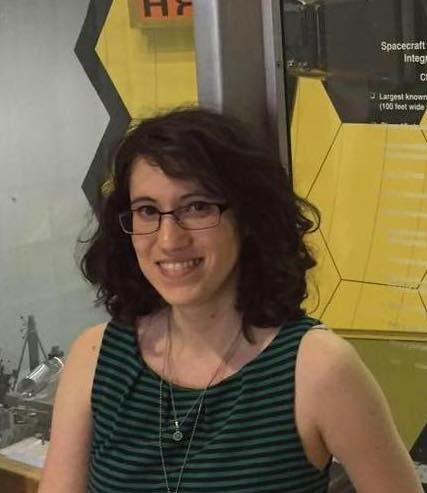
- Arney at the Goddard Space Flight Center in 2018
- Education: University of Colorado Boulder (BA, 2009); University of Washington (MS, 2012; PhD, 2016)
- Known for: Planetary atmosphere modeling Research on early Earth biosignatures Venus sub-cloud atmosphere observations
- Awards: Presidential Early Career Award for Scientists and Engineers (2019); NASA Early Career Achievement Medal (2018)
- Scientific career
- Thesis: Pulling Back the Veil: The Characterization and Habitability of Enshrouded Worlds (2016)

Giada Nicole Arney is an American astrobiologist at NASA's Goddard Space Flight Center. Her research concerns the biosignatures and suitability for life of exoplanets, as well as studying whether Venus may once have been habitable.

== Education and career ==
Arney grew up near Denver, Colorado, with an interest in astronomy from her earliest memories of backyard stargazing with her sister and mother. She graduated from the University of Colorado Boulder with a Bachelor of Arts in astrophysics in 2009, having become interested in astrobiology through a second-year class there. She then attended the University of Washington, where she earned her Master of Science in 2012 and completed a dual-title Ph.D. in astronomy and astrobiology in 2016, advised by Victoria Meadows.

She joined NASA in 2016 as a postdoctoral fellow at the Goddard Space Flight Center, and became a permanent staff researcher there in 2017.

== Recognition ==
Arney received the NASA Early Career Achievement Medal in 2018, followed by the Presidential Early Career Award for Scientists and Engineers in 2019.
