= Kenneth J. Szalai =

American test pilot and aerospace engineer

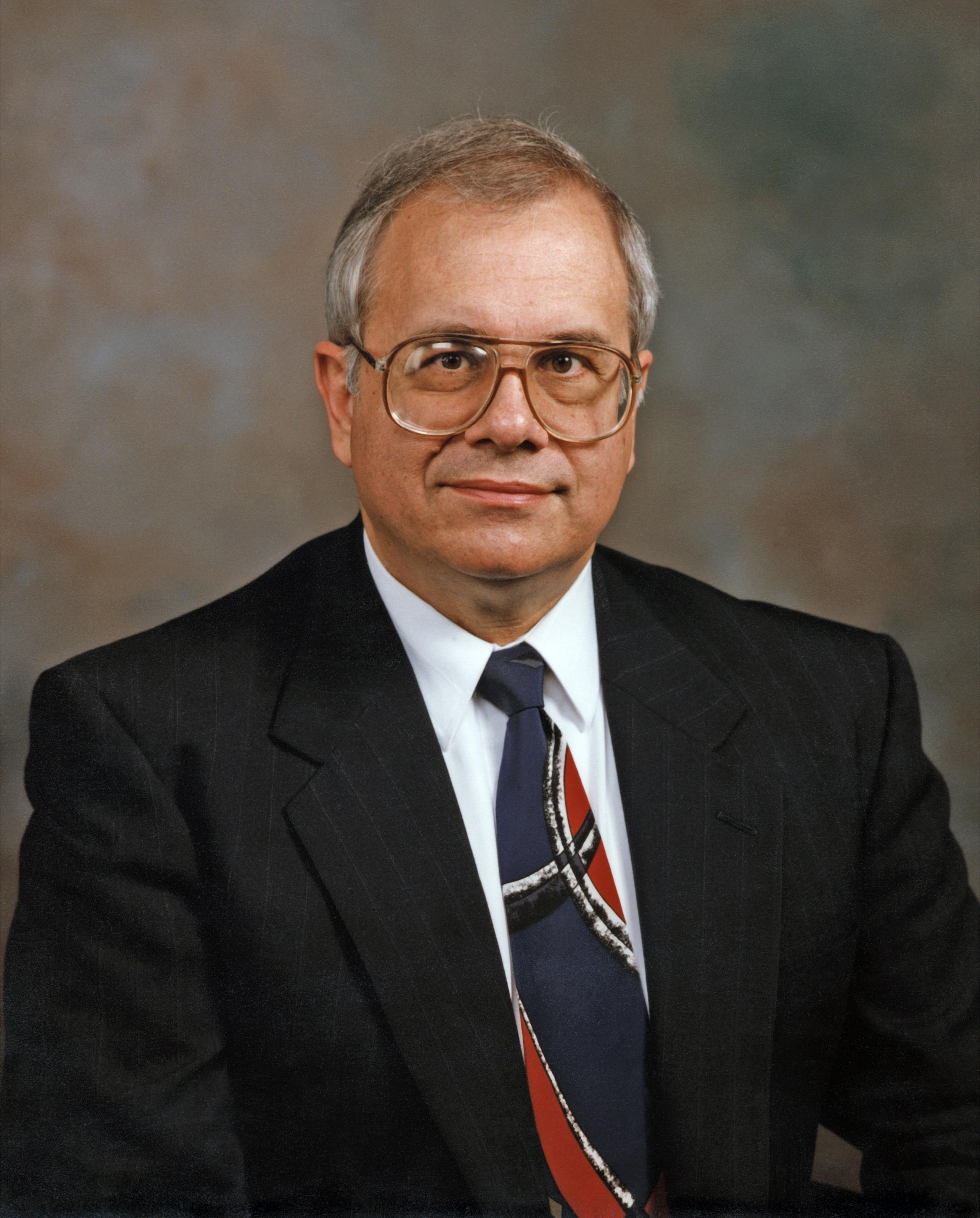
- Portrait in 1997
- Born: 1943 (age 82–83)
- Education: University of Wisconsin–Madison (BS); University of Southern California (MS)
- Occupation: Aerospace engineer
- Years active: 1964 to present
- Known for: Fly-by-wire
- Spouse: Mary Kathryn Szalai
- Awards: NASA Distinguished Service Medal

Kenneth John Szalai (born 1943) is an American aerospace engineer who helped develop the first digital fly-by-wire system for aircraft in 1972. He was director of NASA's Dryden Flight Research Center from 1990 to 1998.

== Early life ==
Szalai attended the University of Wisconsin–Milwaukee and earned a degree in electrical engineering from the University of Wisconsin–Madison in 1964. After working at NASA for four years, he attended the University of Southern California, where he earned a master's degree in mechanical engineering in 1970.

== Career ==
Szalai joined NASA in 1964 after graduating from the University of Wisconsin. He became a principal investigator for the digital fly-by-wire system on the Vought F-8 Crusader, which became the first aircraft to fly with an electronic flight control system in 1972.

From 1982 to 1990, Szalai directed the Dryden Research Engineering Division and served as associate director for Ames Research Center at Moffett Field. He held research and systems engineering positions on several aircraft programs where he investigated integrated flight controls, variable stability aircraft, and fault tolerance in automated systems. Szalai was a flight test engineer and principal investigator on NASA's Airborne Science Program and supported the Stratospheric Observatory for Infrared Astronomy.

He worked on programs including Grumman X-29 and Northrop Grumman Pegasus, in collaboration with Orbital Inc. He also led research on integrated digital engine controls, supersonic laminar flow, avionics, and unmanned aerial vehicles.

Szalai became facility director for NASA's Dryden Flight Research Center and deputy director of Ames Research Center on December 3, 1990. He was appointed center director of Dryden on March 1, 1994. As director, he oversaw programs including Rockwell-MBB X-31, a collaboration with Germany, the unmanned McDonnell Douglas X-36, and the NASA X-38 crew return vehicle. He also oversaw supersonic tests of the Lockheed SR-71 Blackbird and scramjet-powered NASA X-43. He served as director until July 31, 1998.

Szalai initiated international cooperation efforts with Russia under the Gore–Chernomyrdin Commission, including on high-speed flight research using the supersonic Tupolev Tu-144. He was appointed by NASA administrator Daniel Goldin to lead the join NASA-Italian Space Agency Shuttle Mission Failure Board for the joint electrodynamic tether experiment on STS-46. He also chaired a NASA assessment for Moon-Mars exploration under NASA administrator Michael D. Griffin.

After passing the directorship of Dryden to Kevin L. Petersen, Szalai co-founded IIBP Aerospace Group, Inc. (acquired by BFGoodrich in March 2000), acting as president until 2002. They developed ejection seats for the Air Force Research Laboratory and U.S. Navy using Russian technology. Since 2003, he is president of Aerospace Services International (ASI), a technical consulting firm.

In March 2003, he was commissioned by NASA as a private consultant to study using the Apollo command and service module to return astronauts to the moon as part of the Constellation program. As of 2021, he is chairman of the technical advisory group for Stratolaunch.

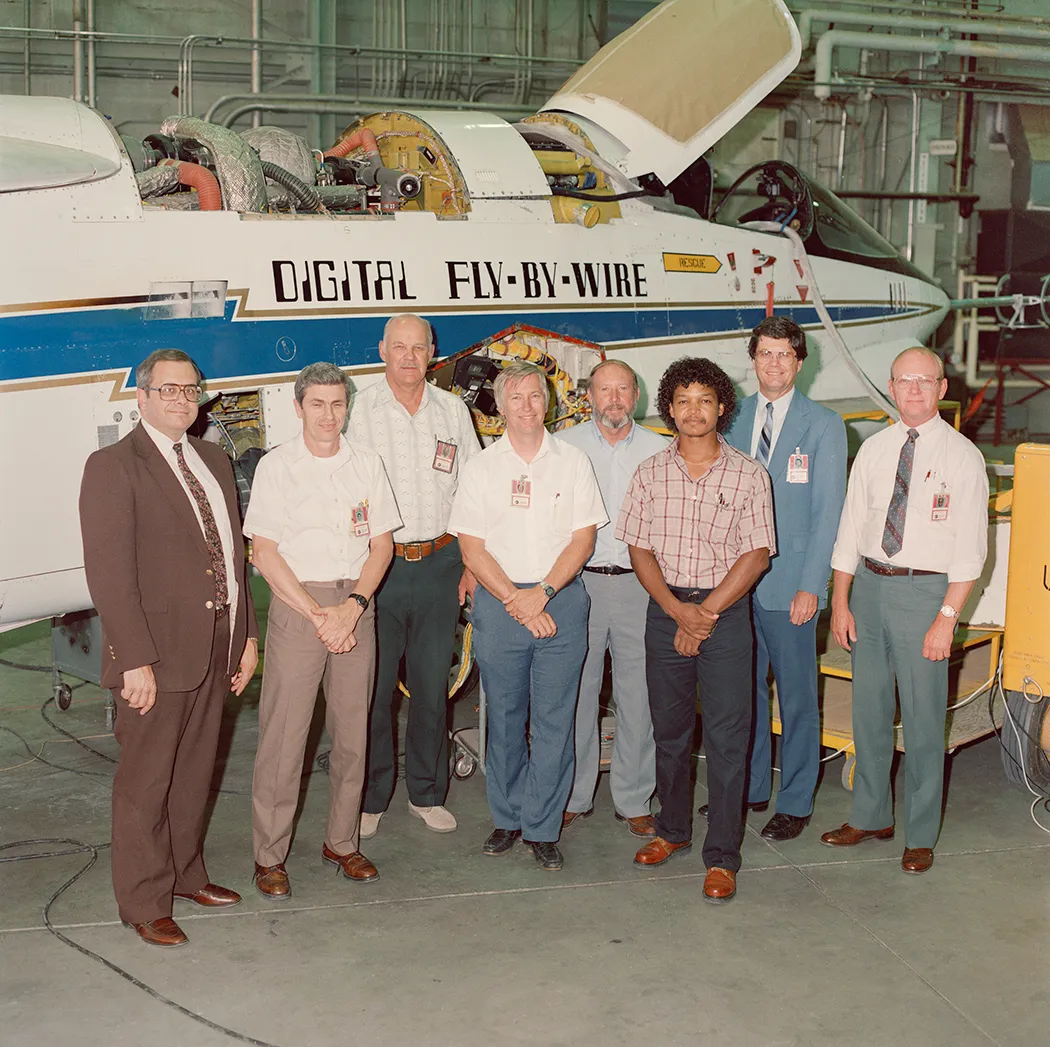
F-8 with NASA engineers (Szalai left)

Szalai was a member of the Applied Physics Laboratory civilian council during planetary missions to Mercury and Pluto. He also served on the Scaled Composites board under Burt Rutan during the SpaceShipOne program that won the $10M Ansari X Prize. He has authored more than 25 papers, was a lecturer for the NATO Advisory Group for Aeronautical Research and Development (AGARD), and served on the 2000 aeronautics study for the U.S. National Academy of Sciences. Szalai is a fellow of the American Institute of Aeronautics and Astronautics (AIAA).

== Awards ==
- NASA Distinguished Service Medal
- NASA Outstanding Leadership Medal (1984)
- Presidential Rank Award
- AIAA Wright Brothers Lectureship Medal (2000)
- ICAS Theodore von Kármán Award for International Cooperation (2003)
- Friend of the Society of Experimental Test Pilots Award (2006)
- Space Technology Hall of Fame (2010)
- NASA Exceptional Public Service Medal

== Personal life ==
Szalai married Mary Kathryn Szalai in 1964. They moved to Lancaster, California in a 1960 Chevrolet Corvette (C1), and have resided there since.
