= Kevin Petersen =

Kevin Petersen may refer to:

- Kevin David Petersen (born 1964), American politician, member of the Wisconsin State Assembly
- Kevin L. Petersen (born 1951), American aerospace engineer

== See also ==
- Kevin Peterson (born 1994), American football player
- Kevin Pietersen (born 1980), England international cricketer
