= Jessie Christiansen =

American astrophysicist

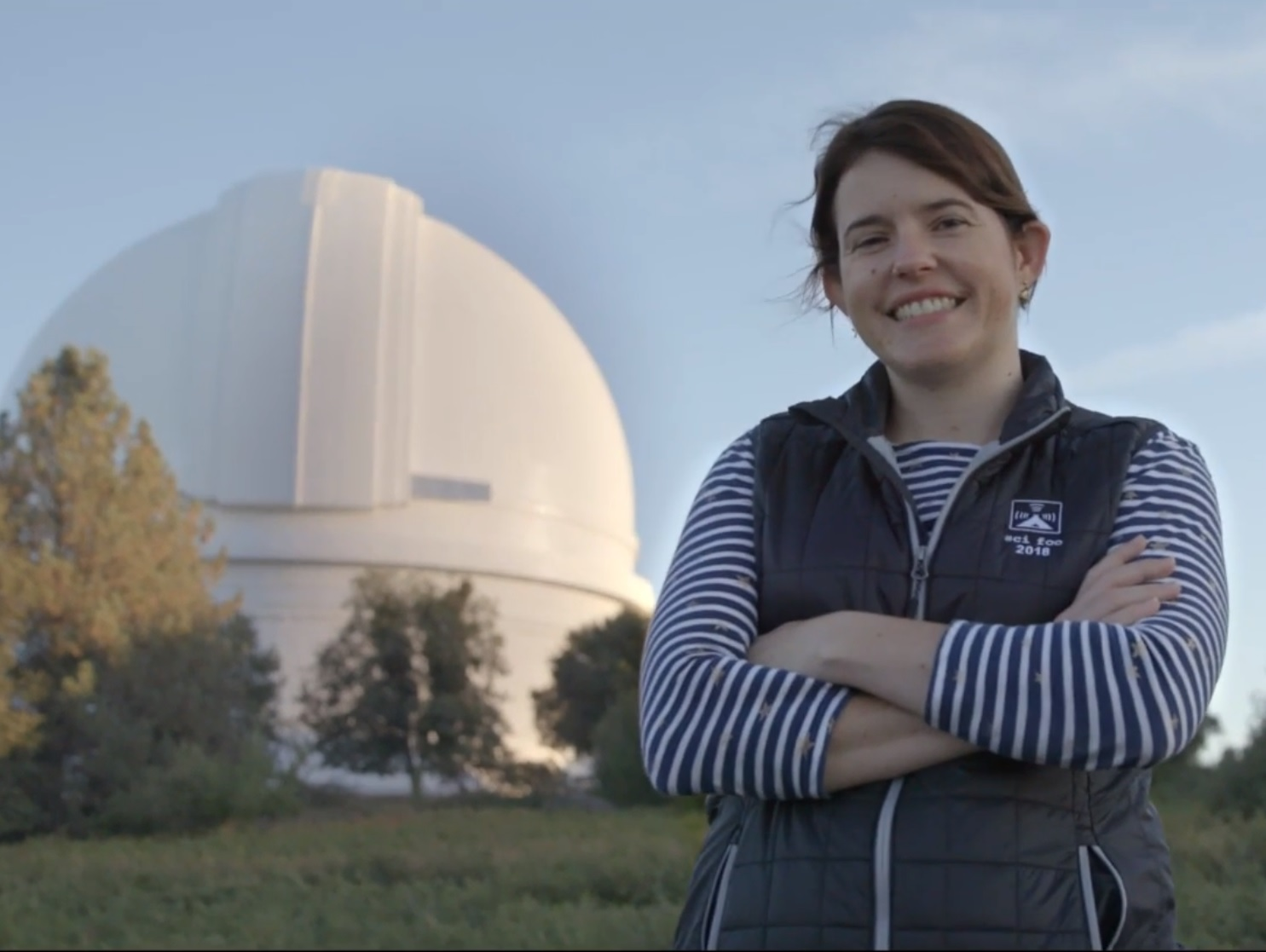
- Christiansen at Palomar Observatory in 2018
- Education: Griffith University (BS) Australian National University (BS (Hons)) University of New South Wales (PhD)
- Scientific career
- Known for: Exoplanets
- Fields: Astrophysics; Astronomy
- Workplaces: NASA Exoplanet Science Institute; California Institute of Technology
- Thesis: A tale of two surveys: searching for extrasolar planets from Australia and Antarctica (2007)
- Doctoral advisor: Michael Ashley
- Website: web.ipac.caltech.edu/staff/christia/

Jessie Christiansen is an Australian astrophysicist who is the Chief Scientist of the NASA Exoplanet Science Institute at the California Institute of Technology (Caltech). She won the 2018 NASA Exceptional Engineering Achievement Medal for her work on the Kepler planet sample.

== Education ==
In 2002 Jessie Christiansen completed a Bachelor of Science (Advanced Studies) in physics and mathematics at Griffith University, Brisbane. She then continued her studies to receive a BSc first class honours in Astronomy at the Australian National University, Canberra. She completed a PhD at the University of New South Wales in 2007, under the supervision of Michael Ashley. Her PhD required observations at the Automated Patrol Telescope at Siding Spring Observatory.

== Career ==
After Christiansen's PhD, she worked as Postdoctoral Research Fellow at the Harvard-Smithsonian Centre for Astrophysics. Christiansen works on the NASA Kepler mission, cataloguing the exoplanets within the Kepler field. As a member of the Kepler Science Team, she won the NASA Group Achievement Award in 2010. She was involved in the planning of the NASA TESS mission, which searches the whole sky for the nearest planets to Earth.

Christiansen uses Citizen Science and the Zooniverse to help in her quest for exoplanets using the Kepler Space Telescope K2 dataset. She worked with Professor Ian Crossfield at MIT to ensure that the K2 data was made public, and in January 2018 announced the discovery of 5 massive exoplanets orbiting the sun-like star K2-138. The exoplanets make up the longest chain of synchronised exoplanets ever discovered, orbiting in near-perfect resonance to their star. In an interview with the BBC, Christiansen spoke about the importance of crowdsourcing research projects "people anywhere can log on and learn what real signals from exoplanets look like, and then look through actual data collected from the Kepler telescope to vote on whether or not to classify a given signal as a transit, or just noise".

Alongside being the plenary speaker at academic conferences, Christiansen gives public talks about her research. She has returned to her alma mater, ANU, to discuss her research "Characterising the Kepler Survey Completeness". In July 2018 Christiansen won the NASA Exceptional Engineering Achievement Medal for her work on the Kepler planet sample.

== Public engagement ==
Christiansen appeared on the Discovery Science program NASA's Unexplained Files. She recorded a panel discussion at Caltech, talking about the science behind Syfy's The Expanse. In 2018 she will appear in Ali Alvarez's documentary Under The Same Stars, about American women astrophysicists. She also discusses exoplanets and the Kepler mission on popular science podcasts.

Her writing has appeared on popular science websites, including the New Scientist, Smithsonian Magazine, and BBC News. In 2015 Christiansen joined 278 other scientists in a letter to the New York Times to object to their article that minimized the trauma of people who accused Professor Geoff Marcy of sexual advances.
