= NASA Exceptional Scientific Achievement Medal =

Award for scientific contribution towards aeronautical/space exploration goals

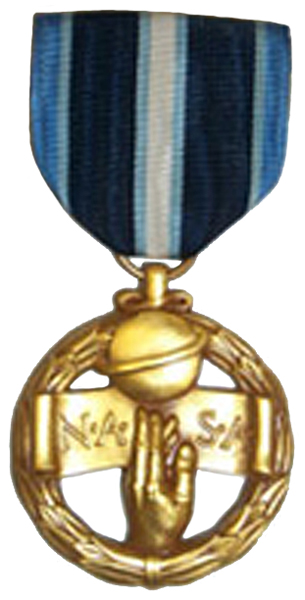
- NASA Exceptional Scientific Achievement Medal
- Type: Medal
- Country: United States
- Presented by: the National Aeronautics and Space Administration
- Eligibility: Government employees and non-government personnel
- Status: Active
- Established: September 15, 1961
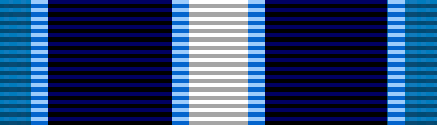
- NASA Exceptional Scientific Achievement Ribbon

Precedence
- Next (higher): Exceptional Achievement Medal; Exceptional Service Medal; Outstanding Service Medal (obsolete)
- Equivalent: Exceptional Engineering Achievement Medal; Exceptional Technology Achievement Medal; Exceptional Administrative Achievement Medal; Equal Employment Opportunity Medal
- Next (lower): Exceptional Bravery Medal

The NASA Exceptional Scientific Achievement Medal (abbrv. ESAM) was established by NASA on September 15, 1961, when the original ESM was divided into three separate awards. Under its guidelines, the ESAM is awarded for unusually significant scientific contribution toward achievement of aeronautical or space exploration goals. This award may be given for individual efforts that have resulted in a contribution of fundamental importance in this field, or have significantly enhanced understanding of this field.

== Recipients (incomplete list) ==
- 1962 – Robert E. Bourdeau
- 1963 – John Houbolt
- 1965 – Jack N. James
- 1966 – Richard Franz Joseph Arenstorf (He was awarded the medal for his contributions to the Space Navigation and the Apollo Lunar Landing Program.
- 1968 – G. Mervin Ault
- 1969 – Charles Berry, William F. Brown, Thomas Canning, Moustafa Chahine, Hong-Yee Chiu, Clarence Cone, James Downey, Erwin Fehlberg, Richard Green, Rudolf Hanel, Webb Haymaker, Gerhard B. Heller, Harvey Hubbard, James Humphreys, Mark Kelly, James Kupperian, Dale Lumb, Wolfgang Moeckel, Paul Muller, Robert Naumann, William O'Bryant, George Pieper, Henry Plotkin, Joseph Randall, Donald Rea, Nancy Roman, Lee Scherer, William Sjorgen, Charles Sonett, Robert Stone, David Wark, Richard Whitcomb, Donald Wise
- 1970 – William Angele, James R. Arnold, Paul Coleman, Leverett Davis, Milner Eskew, Herbert Friedman, Paul Gast, Peter Macdoran, Warren Martin, Maurice Morin, Marcia Neugebauer, Edward Perkins, Edward Smith, Conway Snyder, Nelson Spencer, Patrick Thaddeus, Robert Walker, Gerald Wasserburg
- 1971 – John C. Freche
- 1972 – Robert Steinbacher, Thomas C. Duxbury, Charles H. Acton, George Robert Carruthers
- 1973 – William A. Fischer, Founder & Sr. Scientist, EROS Space Program; Recipient of the US Distinguished Service Award & many others, including E. Dale Jackson. [Conway B. Leovy]
- 1974 – John A. Simpson, William Edgar Thornton August F. Witt, Carolyn L. Huntoon
- 1975 – Edward Purdy Ney
- 1976 – Tito T. Serafini
- 1977 – Janos K. Lanyi
- 1978 – Elihu Boldt, Hale Bradt, Herbert Friedman, Gordon Garmire, Herbert Gursky, Walter Lewin, Frank McDonald, Laurence Peterson, Alvin Seiff, Robert Tolson
- 1979 – Milton Halem
- 1980 – Riccardo Giacconi (2002 Nobel Laureate in Physics)
- 1981 – Andrew Ingersoll, Talivaldis Spalvins
- 1982 – Mary Helen Johnston, Jeff Cuzzi, James V. Taranik
- 1983 – Joel S. Levine
- 1984 – Donald B. Campbell, Fred Gillett, James R. Houck, Frank Low
- 1985 – Prem Chand Pandey, SAC/ISRO, NCAOR and IIT Kharagpur, India, Parviz Moin
- 1986 – Jeff Cuzzi, Crofton B. Farmer, Frank J. Grunthaner, Taylor G. Wang
- 1988 – Nitza Margarita Cintrón, Hal A. Weaver, Michael J. Mumma
- 1989 – Mario Molina (1995 Nobel Laureate in Chemistry), Donald J. Kessler, Inez Fung
- 1990 – Charles M. Telesco, John W. Harvey, Martin A. Pomerantz
- 1991 – Khairul B. M. Q. Zaman, John C. Mather (2006 Nobel Laureate in Physics), Manuel D. Salas, Roy W. Spencer, John Christy
- 1992 – Charles L. Bennett, John C.Brandt, Edward S. Cheng, Donald D. Clayton, Holland C. Ford, Edward J. Groth, Richard J. Harms, Sara E. Heap, Peter Jakobson, William H. Jefferys, Thomas Kelsall, Michael D. King, Tod R. Lauer, David S. Leckrone, F. Duccio Macchetto, Stephan S. Meyers, S. Harvey Moseley, Thomas L. Murdock, Ruth Pater, Michael J. Prather, Richard A. Shafer, Robert F. Silverberg, Wei-kuo Tao, James A. Westphal, Ray J. Weymann, Edward L. Wright, James A. DiCarlo, Nathan S. Jacobson, George Smoot (2006 Nobel Laureate in Physics)
- 1993 – Rebecca A. MacKay
- 1994 – Robert A. Bindschadler, Theodore E. Bunch, Emmett W. Chappelle, Malcolm M. Cohen, Dale P. Cruikshank, Hay C. Hardin, Alice K. Harding, Donald Horan, Winifred M. Huo, Isabella T. Lewis, Erick Malaret, Camden McCarl, Robert Riesse, Piers J. Sellers, Trevor C. Sorensen, Thomas A. Zang Jr.
- 1995 – James L. Smialek, Maria T. Zuber, Robert D. Moser
- 1996 – Kevin Zahnle, Carolyn Shoemaker, Eugene Merle Shoemaker
- 1997 – James O. Arnold, David H. Atkinson, David H. Bailey, John E. Carlstrom, Ara Chutjian, John W. Connell, Harald M. Fischer, Everett K. Gibson Jr., William L. Grose, Marshall K. Joy, Kathie L. Thomas-Keprta, Louis J. Lanzerotti, David S. McKay, Michael J. Mumma, Hasso B. Niemann, Glenn S. Orton, Peter A. Pilewskie, Carolyn Purvis, Boris Ragent, Alvin Seiff, Lawrence Sromovsky, Ulf von Zahn, Richard N. Zare
- 1998 – Narottam P. Bansal, Timothy J. Lee
- 1999 – Jeff Cuzzi, Martin Weisskopf
- 2000 – Hugh J. Christian Jr., Joan Feynman, Mona J. Hagyard, Yoram J. Kaufman, Ellis E. Remsberg
- 2001 – Linda L. Jahnke, Azadeh Tabazadeh
- 2002 – Thomas P. Charlock, Gilles Peltzer
- 2003 – Philip R. Christensen, Jean O. Dickey, Geoffrey W. Marcy, Martin G. Mlynczak, Ronald L. Moore, Richard F. Mushotzky, Eric Rignot, Farid Salama, Wei-Kuo Tao
- 2004 – Charles L. Bennett, Randall G. Hulet, David P. Kratz, Steven J. Ostro, Thomas L. Sever, Chris R. Webster, Yuk-ling Yung
- 2005 – Ichiro Fukumori, James R. Houck, Nicholas Leventis, Steven Suess, Michael Watkins
- 2006 – Michael F. A'Hearn, David Charbonneau, Drake Deming, Neil Gehrels, John Le Marshall, Edward C. Stone, Tod Strohmayer, Larry W. Thomason
- 2007 – Scott Braun, Donald Brownlee, Joan Centrella, Moustafa Chahine, Mark S. Marley, Eric Rignot, Alan Title
- 2008 – Anthony Del Genio, David G. Fischer, Gerald M. Heymsfield, Russell A. Howard, Ronald Kwok, Michael I. Mishchenko, Son V. Nghiem
- 2009 – James E. Fesmire, Gilles Peltzer, Michael J. Mumma, Anne R. Douglass
- 2010 – Peter H. Smith, William V. Boynton, Heather L. Enos, Christopher R. Shinohara
- 2011 – Carl J. Grillmair, Suzanne E. Smrekar, Yuhe T. Song, Timothy J. Lee, Eric Jensen, Jason Rowe, Jeff Scargle, Cheryl A. Nickerson
- 2013 – David Paige
- 2014 – Joshua Coleman, Daniel Huber
- 2015 – Carrie M. Anderson
- 2016 – David R. Ciardi, Amy R. Winebarger, Francesco Tombesi, Hiroya Yamaguchi, Ignacy Telesman, Jason Rowe
- 2017 – Sylvain Guiriec, Maria Cristina De Sanctis, Samuel Gulkis, Thomas H. Prettyman, Michele Vallisneri, Kasthuri J. Venkateswaran, Beth Lewandowski
- 2018 – Susan E. Mullally, Michael B. Stenger, Adolfo Figueroa Vinas, Gordon Holman, Lazaros Oreopoulos, Richard Ray, M. Cristina De Sanctis, Walter A. Petersen, Michael Russell
- 2019 – John D. Bolten, Carl R. Devore, Alex Glocer, Jonathan H. Jiang, Erin A. Kara, Fei Liu, Elizabeth A. MacDonald, Amy A. Simon, Lynn B. Wilson III, Cheol Park, Andreas Nathues
- 2020 – Renee C. Weber, Zaven Arzoumanian
- 2021 – John Baross, Eli Dwek, Floyd William Stecker, Xu Liu, Eleonora Troja
- 2022 – Sibasish Laha, Jane Rigby, Michael McElwain, Charles Nickolos Arge, Peter Kalmus
- 2023 – Hongbin Yu, Koji Mukai, Glyn Collinson, Pankaj Kumar, Ju-mee Ryoo, Noah Randolph-Flagg
- 2024 – Mathias Benn, Bjorn Davidsson, Christina Plainaki, Federico Tosi, Jason Williams

== See also ==
- List of NASA awards
