= Michele Vallisneri =

Italian physicist

- Born: July 15, 1973 (age 53) American
- Education: California Institute of Technology
- Scientific career
- Fields: Gravitational Physics
- Workplaces: ETH Zurich; California Institute of Technology

Michele Vallisneri (born July 15, 1973) is an Italian-American theoretical physicist, gravitational-wave astronomer who is currently Full Professor of Gravitational Physics in the Department of Physics at ETH Zurich. He is an Elected Fellow of the American Physical Society. Prior to his appointment at ETH Zurich, he was a Senior Research Scientist at the NASA Jet Propulsion Laboratory of the California Institute of Technology (Caltech) in Pasadena, USA, a position he held until December 2024. He also holds a long-standing secondary appointment as Visiting Associate Faculty in Theoretical Astrophysics at Caltech, a role he has held since 2005.

His research spans gravitational-wave science across the spectrum, with a focus on detecting low-frequency gravitational waves using pulsar timing arrays, implementing the LISA (Laser Interferometer Space Antenna) science analysis, and exploring the applications of neural networks to gravitational-wave inference.

He received his Ph.D. degree from the California Institute of Technology in 2002, with a doctoral thesis on "Modeling and detecting gravitational waves from compact stellar objects," under the supervision of relativist Kip Thorne. Before that, he earned both a Laurea in physics in 1997 and a doctorate in physics in 2000 from the University of Parma, Italy.

In 2016, he was part of the LIGO Scientific Collaboration that was awarded the "Special Breakthrough Prize in Fundamental Physics for the detection of gravitational waves 100 years after Albert Einstein predicted their existence".[] In the same year, he received the JPL Explorer Award for outstanding scientific achievement. In 2017 he was awarded the NASA Exceptional Scientific Achievement Medal for "outstanding contributions to ground- and space-based detection of gravitational waves, critical to the nascent field of observational gravitational-wave astronomy." Earlier in his career, in 2008, he was recognized with the Italian Society of Gravitation Young Scientist Prize for his contributions to gravitational physics.
