= Gordon Dean Holman =

American astrophysicist, NASA scientist

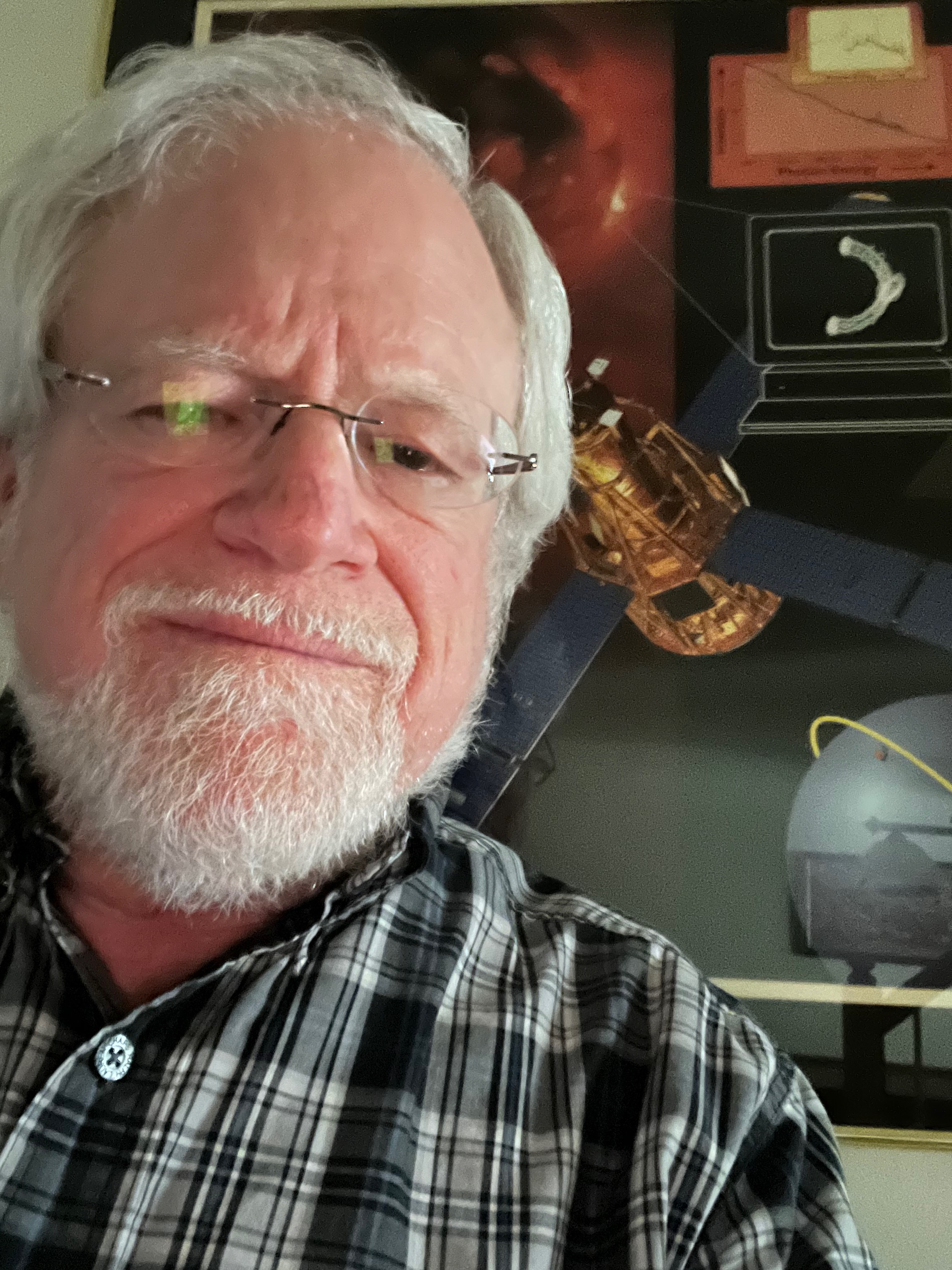
- Born: 1949 (age 76–77)
- Education: PhD
- Occupation: Astrophysicist

Gordon Dean Holman is an American astrophysicist at the National Aeronautics and Space Administration's (NASA's) Goddard Space Flight Center in Greenbelt, Maryland. His research mostly focused on obtaining an understanding of high-energy radiation from astronomical objects. This radiation cannot be observed from Earth's surface, but is observed with instruments on satellites launched to orbits above Earth's atmosphere. It is primarily emitted by high-energy electrons interacting with ions. These electrons also emit radiation at radio frequencies which is observed from Earth's surface. Consequently, these observations from space and radio telescopes provide a view of hot gas and energetic particles in the Universe that could not otherwise be obtained. Holman has specialized in the interpretation of these observed emissions to determine the origin and evolution of this hot gas and energetic particles.

Holman spent most of his career as a solar physicist on the Science Team of the Reuven Ramaty High Energy Solar Spectroscopic Imager (RHESSI), a space observatory designed to observe X-ray emission from solar flares. He has authored or co-authored over a hundred research papers about solar flares and active regions, clusters of galaxies and disconnection events in comet tails.

He is author of the book "The Scientific Method: Why science is a crucial process for human progress, not just another academic subject or belief".

== Education ==
After graduating from Northeast High School in Fort Lauderdale, Florida, in 1967, Holman obtained a Bachelor of Science degree in physics with a minor in mathematics at Florida State University in 1971.

In the summer of 1970 Holman was awarded an International Association for the Exchange of Students for Technical Experience (IAESTE) traineeship at the Physikalisch-Techniche Bundesanstalt in Braunschweig, Germany, where he interned with a group studying the stimulated emission of trapped electrons from solid surfaces. This led to a research note in the journal Physica Status Solidi.

Holman obtained a Master of Science degree in physics in 1973 and Doctor of Philosophy degree in astrophysics in 1977, both from the University of North Carolina at Chapel Hill. His PhD dissertation, obtained under the supervision of Dr. Wayne A. Christiansen, was titled "Models for X-Ray and Radio Emission from Clusters of Galaxies".

== Career ==
Holman started his career as a physics graduate student teaching observational laboratories for freshman astronomy students at the Morehead Planetarium and Science Center in Chapel Hill, NC. He also assisted with lecture courses in astronomy, physics, and Physics and Society.

In 1977 Holman was hired as a lecturer in the Astronomy Program at the University of Maryland, College Park. In August 1977 he was awarded a two-year Postdoctoral Fellowship at the Maryland Center for Fundamental Physics. He was hired as a Research associate in 1979 by Mukul Kundu to work with his solar radio astronomy group. He remained with this group at the University of Maryland for four years. With Kundu he coedited the Proceedings of the International Astronomical Union (IAU) Symposium No, 107, "Unstable Current Systems and Plasma Instabilities in Astrophysics".

In 1983 Holman was awarded a two-year National Academy of Sciences / National Research Council Senior Research Associateship at NASA's Goddard Space Flight Center. He was hired into a federal civil service position at Goddard in 1985 in what is now the Laboratory for Solar Physics, where he remained until he retired in 2018. In 1988 Holman spent roughly six months at NASA Headquarters in Washington DC assisting with NASA's Space physics proposal review process.

While at NASA Goddard, Holman supervised four PhD students (through UNC Chapel Hill and The Catholic University of America) and mentored numerous Postdoctoral Fellows and summer interns. He contributed to the NASA / UC Berkeley Lesson Series Exploring Magnetism.

Holman is a member of the American Astronomical Society (AAS), American Geophysical Union (AGU), International Astronomical Union (IAU), and the Committee on Space Research (COSPAR). He was an elected member of the SPD Committee of the Solar Physics Division (SPD) of the AAS in 2005 – 2007.

== Research ==
=== Hot gas and energetic electrons in giant clusters of galaxies ===
In the early 1970s extended sources of X-ray emission were detected in large clusters of galaxies with the Uhuru satellite. Extended radio sources were also observed in some large clusters such as Coma and Perseus. In his PhD Thesis Holman explored the implications of models that explained both sources as arising from the same population of energetic electrons. Subsequent observations in the mid-1970s indicated that the X-ray emission is thermal radiation from hot, ionized thermal gas (plasma) with a temperature near 100 million degrees, not more energetic non-thermal electrons. Holman and collaborators showed how the population of non-thermal electrons responsible for the radio emission could also heat the plasma producing the X-rays, providing a connection between the two sources.

It had been argued that energetic charged particles streaming through magnetized thermal plasma could only propagate at the Alfvén speed because of interaction with Alfvén waves in the plasma. This would restrict the size of the radio source. Holman and collaborators showed that the damping of short-wavelength Alfvén waves could keep the particles from being slowed to this speed, especially in the exceptionally hot plasma in the clusters of galaxies.

=== Maser emission from the Sun and active stars ===
In 1978 and later rapid spikes of microwave radiation were observed during the impulsive phase of some solar flares. The high brightness of these spikes indicated that a coherent radiation process must be responsible. Holman and colleagues showed that maser emission from a distribution of high-energy electrons partially mirrored at the bottom of a magnetic loop could be responsible for these spikes. This mechanism is also likely to be responsible for bright radio flares from active stars such as the M-dwarf star AD Leo.

=== Radio emission from shock waves driven by solar eruptions ===
Eruptions of rapidly moving material from the Sun, coronal mass ejections, drive shock waves in the solar corona and beyond. Radio emission has long been observed from these shock waves. This solar radio emission was given the designation "Type II radio burst" in the early 1950s. Holman and Pesses hypothesized that Type II emission is stimulated by electrons energized by shock drift acceleration. They found the hypothesis to be sound and identified implications for the geometry of the shock wave and the corresponding sources of radio emission. Holman has collaborated on observational studies examining the initiation of coronal mass ejections and the properties of Type II emission.

=== Coronal magnetic field in active regions on the Sun ===
The Sun's magnetic field is enhanced in active regions, where sunspots are located. Major solar flares and eruptions also originate in active regions. (However, in 2015 Holman and collaborator Adi Foord found that a significant X-ray flare occurred outside any active region, in association with the eruption of a long, quiescent filament.) The enhanced magnetic field and its evolution is understood to be the source of energy for this activity. Therefore, it is important to know the strength and structure of active region magnetic fields.

The wavelength of microwave emission from active regions provides a measure of the magnetic field strength in hot, magnetically confined structures at coronal temperatures. In the late 1980s and early 1990s, Holman and collaborators carried out the Coronal Magnetic Structures Observing Campaign (CoMStOC). This campaign obtained observations of multiple active regions with the Very Large Array (VLA) radio telescope in New Mexico combined with X-ray observations from the Flat Crystal Spectrometer on the Solar Maximum Mission (SMM) satellite as well as other relevant observations. Magnetic field strengths up to 600 Gauss were deduced, while the presence of cooler plasma and higher Alfvén speeds than expected in the corona were also inferred.

=== Comet ion tail disconnection events ===
A particularly impressive feature observed in comets is the disconnection event, when the ion tail (also called gas or plasma tail) of the comet disconnects and moves away from the head. There are several possible explanations for this phenomenon, one of which is magnetic reconnection at the front of the comet where the tail magnetic field wraps around the nucleus.

In 1985 Holman contributed to the NASA Jet Propulsion Laboratory publication "The comet Giacobini-Zinner handbook. An observer's guide to the first comet to be explored by a spacecraft". The intercepting spacecraft was the International Cometary Explorer (ICE). When Halley's comet made its appearance in 1986, ICE was nearby obtaining measurements of the thermal and magnetic properties of the solar wind through which the comet was traveling. Brosius, Holman and collaborators examined two disconnection events that occurred during this period of time along with the properties of the solar wind measured by ICE. They concluded that the first disconnection event was most likely front-side magnetic reconnection caused by a polarity reversal in the solar wind magnetic field impacting the comet. The second event might have also been caused by a polarity reversal, but a high density and velocity compression region was present as well that might have caused or contributed to the event.

=== Energetic particles and magnetic reconnection in solar flares ===
Holman was Co-Investigator and member of the science team for the Ramaty High Energy Solar Spectroscopic Imager (RHESSI). The RHESSI satellite was an observatory designed to explore the basic physics of particle acceleration and explosive energy release in solar flares by obtaining high-resolution spectroscopic imaging of flares in X rays and gamma rays. It was launched in early 2002 and was decommissioned in 2018. Much of Holman's research focuses on analysis of the RHESSI X-ray data to deduce the origin and evolution of energetic electrons produced in solar flares.

Holman has collaborated on major studies of the partition of energy in solar eruptive events (large eruptions consisting of both a flare and a coronal mass ejection). Observational studies by him and his collaborators have helped establish that the primary site of energy release is magnetic reconnection in the corona, seen as a cusp at the top of flare magnetic loops. He has examined the impact of a return current that is expected to be co-spatial with the streaming energetic electrons responsible for the highest energy X-ray emission from flares and, with Meriem Alaoui Abdallaoui, continues to examine the impact of the return current on flare evolution.

Multiple reviews of this and related research have been authored or coauthored by Holman. In 2016 he authored a review addressing future observations from space that would lead to substantial progress toward our understanding of solar activity.

== Awards and honors ==
- In 2018 Holman received NASA's Exceptional Scientific Achievement Medal for outstanding contributions to the scientific understanding of the processes of magnetic energy release and particle acceleration in solar flares.
- As a member of the RHESSI Science and Data Analysis Team, he received a NASA Group Achievement Award in 2013.
- In 2007 he received the Popular Writing Award from the Solar Physics Division of the American Astronomical Society for his 2006 article in Scientific American.
- A short biography has been listed in Marquis Who's Who.
