= Michael J. Mumma =

American astrobiologist

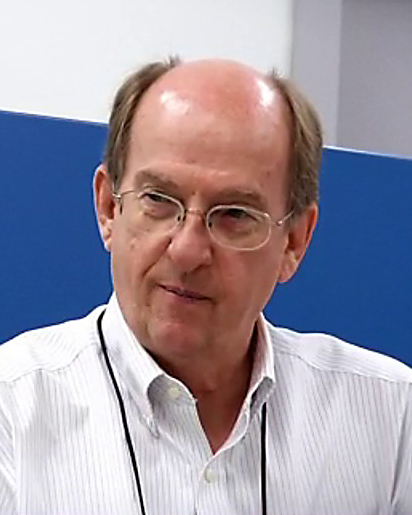
Michael J. Mumma, 2010 (cropped)

Michael J. Mumma is an American astrobiologist at the Goddard Space Flight Center; he is best known for his investigation of the chemistry of comets.

== Education ==
Mumma graduated Franklin and Marshall College in 1963, with an A.B. in physics. He received a Ph.D. in physics from the University of Pittsburgh in 1970, and joined NASA's GSFC thereafter.

== Career ==
Mumma is the founding director of the Goddard Center for Astrobiology (2003–2020) and Senior Scientist in the Solar System Exploration Division (2005–2020). He has had adjunct professorships at Pennsylvania State University, University of Toledo and University of Maryland during his tenure with GFSC.

Mumma's major research interests have been largely directed towards understanding life's origin and its distribution in the cosmos through the study of planetary and cometary chemistry. Mumma pioneered the first detection of water in comets. Using similar spectrometric methodology Mumma has identified many other gaseous species found in comets. He posits that it is possible that comets "seeded life" on the Earth, filling the oceans with water and essential molecular building blocks. He uses information gleaned from Comet LINEAR showing the same isotopic composition as water on the Earth. Recent cometary data on water confirms the data from Comet LINEAR. For his longstanding contribution to planetary science, in 1999 the International Astronomical Union named asteroid 8340 "Michael J. Mumma".

Mumma's group at GFSC was the first to report methane plumes on Mars, and suggested that pores in the soil might open only during certain seasons. These findings have been recently confirmed. The source of the methane is still unresolved, whether it is geochemical or from living systems, which would indicate life on Mars. As far as further findings and conclusions, Mumma stated: "There will be surprising results."

Mumma reports that the most important thing he does is working "intensely" with young scientists, exposing them to the "exciting" research at GFSC. At Goddard, he has mentored 31 post-docs and senior visiting scientists and has codirected eight Ph. D. theses.

So, every day brings something new to us. It's the newness, the continued discovery-rather small ones, larger ones, it doesn't matter, and in my view it's not work, you see. This is the way we spend our lives, in discovery, and this is an opportunity to continue doing that daily.

In 2019 Mumma was part of the team that found water vapors on Europa. This is important as Europa is a prime target in looking for life forms in the solar system.

Mumma appeared as himself in a 2007 episode of The Universe.

== Awards ==
Elected Fellow of the American Physical Society, 1990

NASA Exceptional Scientific Achievement Medal, 1997.

John C. Lindsay Memorial Award, 2009

NASA Distinguished Service Medal, 2020

Society of Distinguished Alumni, Franklin and Marshall College.

8340 Mumma, minor planet named after him.
