= Peter Kalmus (climate scientist) =

American physicist

- Born: May 9, 1974 (age 52)
- Education: Harvard University (BS); Columbia University (PhD)
- Awards: NASA Early Career Achievement Medal, Transition US Walk the Talk Award
- Scientific career
- Fields: Climate science, ecological forecasting, science communication
- Workplaces: Jet Propulsion Laboratory, California Institute of Technology, University of California, Los Angeles
- Website: peterkalmus.net

Peter Kalmus (born May 9, 1974) is an American scientist and writer. He is a data scientist at NASA's Jet Propulsion Laboratory as an associate project scientist at UCLA's Joint Institute for Regional Earth System Science & Engineering.

In addition to his scientific work, he is the author of the book, Being the Change: Live Well and Spark a Climate Revolution. A documentary by the same title complements the book. In addition to authoring articles about climate change, he is the founder of the website noflyclimatesci.org and co-founder of the app, Earth Hero: Climate Change.

== Education and early career ==
Kalmus attended Harvard University, where he received his Bachelor of Science in physics in 1997. At Harvard, he used Fourier-transform microwave spectroscopy to discover and categorize the quantum-mechanical rotational spectra of several cyanopolyynes which were subsequently found in interstellar clouds. He then taught high school physics in Massachusetts and wrote software in New York City. In 2004 he enrolled in graduate school at Columbia University and received his PhD in physics in 2008. His PhD work involved searching for gravitational waves as a member of the LIGO Scientific Collaboration (thesis: "Gravitational Waves Associated with Soft Gamma Repeater Flares"). He continued his work with LIGO as a postdoctoral scholar at the California Institute of Technology, leading major full-collaboration searches for gravitational waves from magnetars, gamma ray bursts and supernovae and contributing to the precise calibration of the world's gravitational wave observatories.

== Research ==
After focusing on LIGO related work for several years, Kalmus's focus transitioned into earth and climate science. Kalmus's recent research centers on cloud physics, specifically improving basic understanding of marine stratocumulus clouds and severe convective weather such as tornadoes with the goal of improving projections of how these phenomena will change as the planet heats, using remote sensing data, in situ data, and models. Marine stratocumulus clouds reflect incoming sunlight, cooling the planet, and are difficult to model accurately in climate models; this makes them a major source of uncertainty in climate projections.

A common thread in his research is improving the utility of satellite observations of the Earth. His work on severe weather unlocks the potential of polar orbiting satellites to observe rapidly changing convective environments by using air parcel trajectory modeling to span the temporal gap between satellite overpass and convective initiation. He has used in situ data from a ship-based campaign to bias-correct the CloudSat warm rain retrieval. He also uses in situ data to validate retrievals from the AIRS instrument on the Aqua (satellite).

Kalmus also works in the nascent field of ecological forecasting. Coral reefs are rapidly succumbing to ocean heat waves and ocean acidification. Kalmus is the principal investigator on a NASA grant to study the projected future of the world's coral reefs with improved accuracy and higher resolution.

He has co-authored over 100 peer-reviewed scientific articles in physics and Earth science, with a majority having come from his previous participation in the LIGO Collaboration.

== Activism and public engagement ==
He has been featured in many media outlets, including Mother Jones, PRI's The World, CBC Radio, Deutsche Welle, BuzzFeed, The Intercept, and Quartz, and most often speaks to the need for an immediate and massive climate mobilization and how individuals can "vote" for this mobilization through their actions, via both activism and emissions reduction. He frequently speaks to the need for a carbon fee and dividend policy as part of the mobilization, in which fossil fuel becomes increasingly costly as the carbon fee rises every year and 100% of the net revenue is returned equitably to the people, making the policy fiscally progressive. He focuses in particular on encouraging the Earth science and other academic communities to speak out with greater urgency on the need for climate action.

Kalmus' lifestyle uses approximately one-tenth the fossil fuel of the average American. He says this has made his life more satisfying and meaningful. In 2010, Kalmus realized the flying in planes accounted for roughly 3/4 of his greenhouse gas emissions, and he has not flown on a plane since 2012. Kalmus believes that anyone can contribute to cultural shift by conspicuously modeling the change that needs to happen. He has stated that by "walking the talk" his advocacy has become more effective. Kalmus' book, Being the Change, addresses climate change and the changes individuals can make in their lifestyle.

Kalmus is a columnist and regular contributor at YES! magazine. His writing has also appeared in The Guardian, Eos, The Washington Post, and Grist.

On September 14, 2019, Kalmus tweeted "Never give up" and referenced his latest article, "How to live with the climate crisis without becoming a nihilist".

Kalmus has been associated with the Movement for a People's Party, a progressive organization positioned as an alternative to the Democratic or Republican Party. After the first presidential debate of the 2020 election, Kalmus participated in a four-person response to the debate.

In late‑2021, Kalmus likened his own experiences pushing for greater recognition of the climate problem with those of the two fictional astronomers portrayed in the comedy film Don't Look Up. He also compares absurd events in that film with a series of equally absurd and elusory events in our own world.

Kalmus, along with other climate activists, chained himself to the main doors of the Charlotte Douglas International Airport private jet terminal on November 10, 2022. He was charged with trespassing.

In December 2022, Kalmus and climate scientist Rose Abramoff briefly showed a banner at the eve of a plenary session of the American Geophysical Union's annual Fall Meeting with a call for scientists to engage in protest against climate change: " Out of the lab and into the streets » . AGU removed their research presentations from the meeting, banned them from participation, launched a misconduct inquiry, and complained to Abramoff's employer, Oak Ridge National Laboratory. Kalmus and Abramoff further claimed that AGU threatened to have them arrested if they returned to the meeting. Abramoff was subsequently fired by Oak Ridge. In January 2023, 1500 scientists signed an appeal to object to what happened to their colleagues.

=== JP Morgan Chase building arrest ===
On April 6, 2022, Kalmus was arrested, along with a physicist, an engineer and a science teacher, for chaining himself to the door of the JP Morgan Chase building in Los Angeles, protesting the bank's investments in new fossil fuel projects. Writing in The Guardian in April 2022, Kalmus advocated civil disobedience following the release of the final IPCC Working Group III report. In the article, Kalmus says "It's now the eleventh hour and I feel terrified for my kids, and terrified for humanity. [...] But I'll keep fighting as hard as I can for this Earth, no matter how bad it gets, because it can always get worse".

=== Flying Less movement ===
Kalmus is the founder of the website noflyclimatesci.org and a leading voice in the #FlyingLess movement. He is pushing for the American Geophysical Union to support earth scientists who choose to fly less out of climate concerns, with remote participation options at conferences.

=== School strike for climate ===
Kalmus was a lead organizer on two letters written in support of school striking youth, one from US Earth scientists and one from international scholars. His two sons have been regularly school striking on Fridays since 2018 as part of the Fridays for Future movement.

=== Earth Hero ===
To help users track carbon emissions, Kalmus co-founded the smart phone app Earth Hero. It aims to help users reduce their emissions, shift culture with their reductions, and engage in other forms of climate activism such as protest and civil disobedience.

== Awards and recognition ==
Kalmus has won numerous awards both for his science and activism. He received the NASA Early Career Achievement Medal and three Jet Propulsion Laboratory Voyager Awards for his work in Earth science. He is also a recipient of the inaugural Transition US Walking the Talk award. He is a 2018 "Grist 50" fellow, one of the ten 2018 fellows classified as "Visionaries".

His book, Being the Change: Live Well and Spark a Climate Revolution, won an IPPY Outstanding Book of the Year Award, the Nautilus Book Award, and the Foreword Indies Book Award.
