= Joan Centrella =

American astrophysicist

Joan Mary Centrella is an American astrophysicist known for her research on computer simulations of general relativity, gravity waves, gravitational lenses, and binary black holes. She is the former deputy director of the Astrophysics Science Division at NASA's Goddard Space Flight Center, and is Executive in Residence for Science and Technology Policy at West Virginia University.

== Education and career ==
Centrella graduated summa cum laude from the University of Massachusetts Amherst in 1975. She completed a Ph.D. at the University of Cambridge Institute of Astronomy in 1980.

After postdoctoral research at the University of Texas and University of Illinois, and an additional year as an astronomy lecturer at the University of Texas, she became an associate professor of physics at Drexel University in 1984. She moved to the Goddard Space Flight Center in 2001, and became deputy director in 2010. She moved again to West Virginia University in 2019.

== Recognition ==
Centrella was elected as a Fellow of the American Physical Society in 1998. NASA awarded her the NASA Exceptional Scientific Achievement Medal in 2007, the John C. Lindsay Memorial Award for Space Science in 2008, and the Robert H. Goddard Exceptional Achievement Award for Mentoring in 2013.
