= Friend of the Society of Experimental Test Pilots Award =

The Friend of the Society Award pays tribute to individuals or organizations who have provided an exceptional and notable contribution to the operation and the objectives of the Society of Experimental Test Pilots (SETP). The award was established in 1995 and is sponsored by SETP. A Friend of the Society is not a member of SETP, and there is no requirement for a Friend of the Society to be awarded every year. Honorees are announced at the annual Awards Banquet in Los Angeles, California where they receive public recognition and a commemorative plaque.

== Criteria ==
A Friend of the Society must meet the following criteria:

1. Candidates may not be members of the Society and it is preferred that candidates not be eligible for membership in the Society.
2. The candidate must, over a significant time period, have made a significant contribution to the operation support and the objectives of the Society.

== Recipients ==
Recipients of this award, from 1995 to present, include:

- 1995—Barron Hilton, Hilton Hotels Corporation
- 1996—Dr. Gerry Morton, Robert Staubli
- 1998—David Hartman, Rodman-Downs Ltd.
- 1999—Chaplain William Willson, CHCUSN (Ret)
- 2000—Dr. Richard P. Hallion, USAF Historian and Dr. James O. Young, AFFTC Chief Historian
- 2001—Bob Lafey, Boeing, Audio Visual and Claude Pasquis, CLP Enterprises, Audio Visual
- 2002—Dan Sabovich
- 2003—Fred Johnsen
- 2004—Trevor Bushell, BAE Systems and John Hodgeson
- 2005—Tom Roberts
- 2006—Michael A. Dornheim and Kenneth J. Szalai
- 2007—Dana Kilanowski
- 2009—Hank Caruso, ForeFeathers Enterprises
- 2010—Michael J. Fahrney, The Boeing Company
- 2011—Richard R. Schock, FMS Financial Partners
- 2012—Paula S. Smith, Executive Director, SETP
- 2013—Katherine Benjamin
- 2014—Steve Lewis, National Test Pilot School
- 2015—Carol Guthrie, Former AFFTC Deputy Comptroller and Author
- 2016—Dennis Archuleta, Northrop Grumman and Louise Cullina, Airline Pilots Association (ALPA)
- 2017—Heidi Biermeier
- 2018—Jan and Bruce Schell
- 2019 - Natalie Rice, Disneyland Resorts
- 2020 - Not Awarded
- 2021 - Not Awarded
- 2022 - Not Awarded
- 2023 - Kirsten Larson and Joe Phillips, Textron Aviation
- 2024 - Lisa Brown
- 2025 - Not Awarded
- 2026 - Not Awarded

== See also ==
- List of aviation awards
