= David D. McBride =

American aerospace engineer

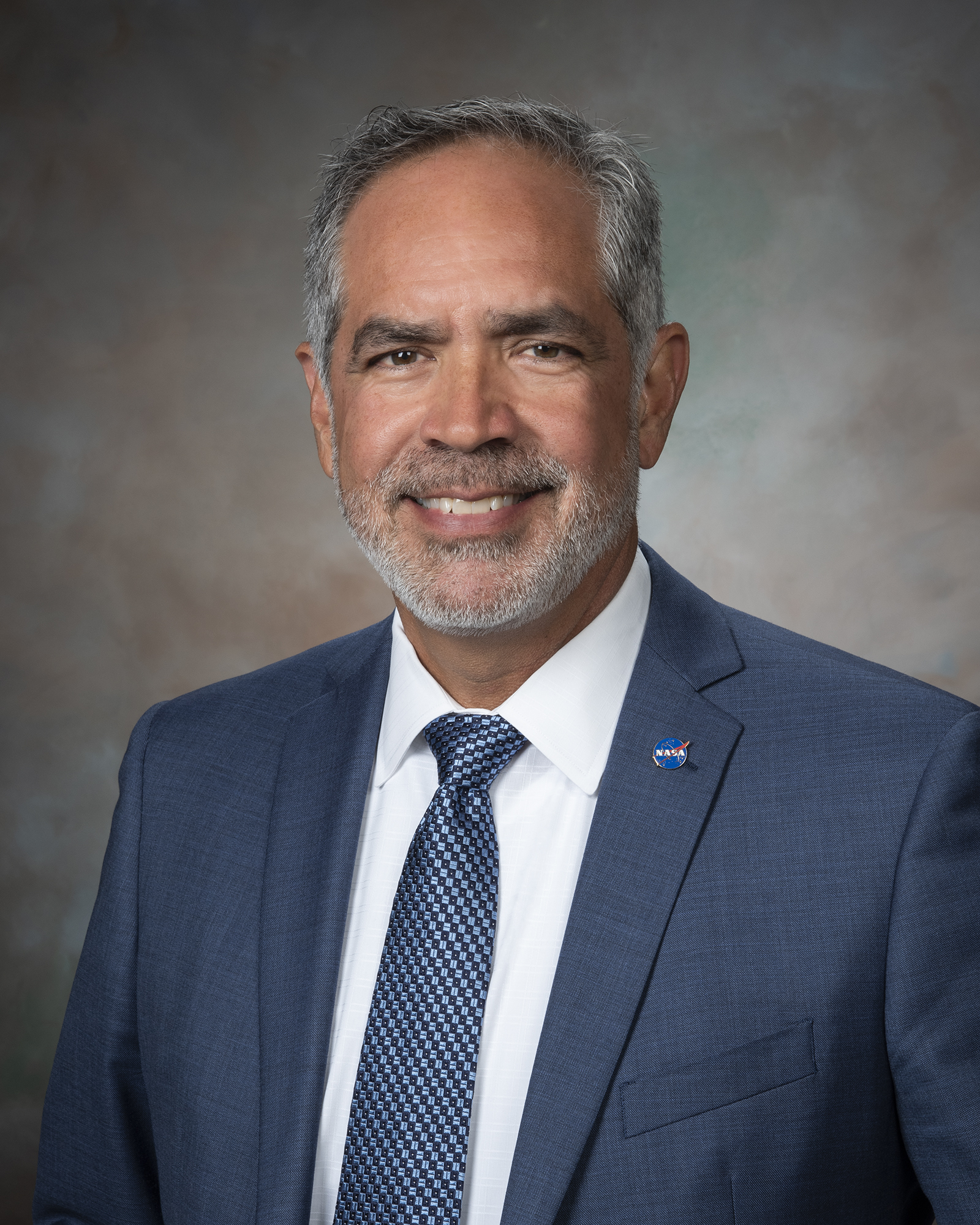
- Portrait in 2021
- Education: University of New Mexico (BS, MBA)
- Occupation: Aerospace engineer
- Years active: 1982–present

David D. McBride is an American aerospace engineer. He was director of NASA's Armstrong Flight Research Center from 2010 to 2022, where he also served as a lead flight systems engineer for the X-31 and X-29 experimental aircraft programs and as chief engineer for the X-33 program.

== Early life and education ==
McBride earned a Bachelor of Science in electrical engineering from the University of New Mexico in 1985. After his first year of college, he began his career at NASA in 1982 through a co-op specializing in digital flight control system analysis. He returned to intern at Dryden Flight Research Center each summer in college. He returned to the University of New Mexico a decade later and earned an Executive MBA from the Anderson School of Management in 1998.

== Career ==
After graduating, McBride joined NASA's Dryden Flight Research Center in Mojave, California as a flight systems engineer. He became a lead flight systems engineer on the forward-swept wing experimental Grumman X-29 aircraft and helped lead thrust vectoring tests on the Rockwell-MBB X-31. He also worked on Dryden's F/A-18 Systems Research Aircraft. McBride was the chief engineer for the uncrewed, reusable Lockheed Martin X-33 spaceplane project.

He was appointed the associate director for flight programs and projects in 2007. As a program manager for NASA's Flight Research Program, the center flew the AeroVironment Helios Prototype solar-electric aircraft to an altitude of 96,863 ft (29,524 m), flew the Boeing X-53 Active Aeroelastic Wing, and performed flight testing of the Intelligent Flight Control System (IFCS) based on neural networks on NASA's NF-15B.

McBride became deputy director of Dryden on April 4, 2009, and acting director on January 4, 2010, after Kevin L. Petersen. He served as the tenth director of NASA Armstrong Flight Research Center until his retirement on December 4, 2022. He is the longest-serving director of NASA Dryden/Armstrong. He was succeeded by Bradley Flick in 2022.

Under McBride, Dryden reached full operational capability with the modified Boeing 747SP Stratospheric Observatory for Infrared Astronomy (SOFIA) and completed flight evaluation of the Boeing X-48B/C experimental hybrid wing body aircraft from August 2012 to April 2013. The center also demonstrated the Orion spacecraft's pad and launch abort systems, used unmanned aerial vehicle to conduct global earth system science, and developed the fully electric NASA X-57 Maxwell and supersonic Lockheed Martin X-59 Quesst aircraft.

After retiring from NASA, McBride runs an engineering consulting firm based in Albuquerque, New Mexico. He showed public support for SpaceX's Crew Dragon Demo-2 mission, the first private mission to bring astronauts to the International Space Station.

In 2024, McBride joined Supernal, Hyundai's Advanced Air Mobility eVTOL company, and was appointed CTO. He resigned the following year along with the former CEO Jaiwon Shin.
