= Jean Dickey =

American geodesist and particle physicist

Jean O'Brien Dickey
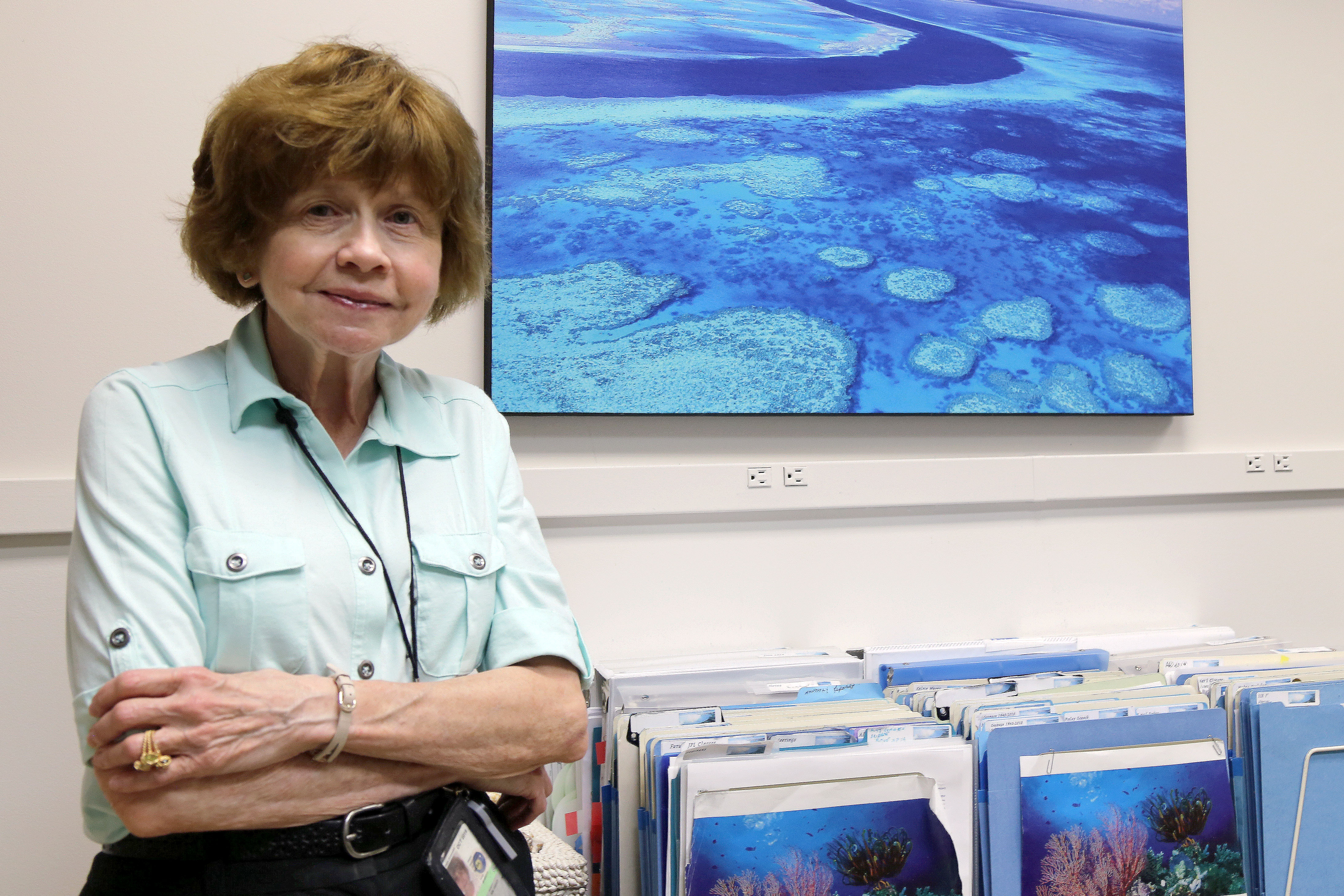
- Born: October 31, 1945; McKeesport, Pennsylvania
- Died: May 9, 2018 (aged 72); Pasadena, California
- Education: Saint Francis University, BS, 1967; Rutgers University, PhD, 1976
- Awards: NASA Exceptional Service Medal, NASA Exceptional Scientific Achievement Medal
- Scientific career
- Fields: Geodesy
- Workplaces: Argonne National Laboratory; California Institute of Technology; Jet Propulsion Laboratory

Jean O'Brien Dickey (31 October 1945 – 9 May 2018) was an American scientist. Dickey was a pioneering geodesist and particle physicist with expertise in Earth rotation. After receiving a PhD from Rutgers University, she spent much of her career at NASA's Jet Propulsion Laboratory (JPL). Between 1994 and 1996, she served as President of the American Geophysical Union's geodesy section, the first woman to hold that position.

== Education and early career ==
Dickey was born on October 31, 1945, in McKeesport, Pennsylvania, a suburb of Pittsburgh, as the second of six children. Her father was an architectural designer for the G.C. Murphy chain of stores.

Dickey attended Saint Francis University, a small liberal arts college in Pennsylvania, where she began studying engineering. She later changed her major to physics, and in her senior year, began an honors program at the U.S. Department of Energy’s Argonne National Laboratory. She received her Bachelor of Science degree in 1967. She then attended Rutgers University where she received her doctoral degree in high-energy physics in 1976. In an interview, she noted that she chose particle physics because “it was finding the essence, the basic building blocks of the universe. The quirks, colors and flavors.”

From 1976 to 1980, she was a postdoctoral researcher at the California Institute of Technology, where she used data collected from particle experiments conducted at Fermilab, a Particle accelerator laboratory outside of Chicago. There, she became an expert in analyzing large datasets, using specialized software to analyze data from particle collisions. Following her postdoctoral work, she changed her focus to studying the rotation of the Earth at the Jet Propulsion Laboratory.

== Career and research ==
Dickey began her 37-year tenure at NASA's Jet Propulsion Laboratory (JPL) working on the Lunar Laser Ranging experiment, studying the time required for lasers to travel between observatories on the Earth and reflectors left on the Moon by NASA astronauts in order to understand how the moon oscillates as the Earth rotates. Dickey soon shifted her focus to studying the rotation of the Earth, which does not revolve at a uniform pace. She also studied how small variations in the Moon's oscillation and Earth's rotation could impact weather, sea level rise, and space exploration. In 2007, Dickey was appointed senior research scientist at JPL. She retired from JPL ten years later in 2017.

=== Rotation of the Earth ===
Dickey studied the exchange of angular momentum between the solid Earth, the atmosphere, and the oceans in order to better understand what forces and processes influence fluctuations in the way the Earth spins. Her team found that fluctuations in the length-of-day (LOD) and atmospheric angular momentum (AAM), which spike every 40 to 50 days are driven by two factors: an approximately 50-day cycle of tropical, convectively-driven waves, known as the Madden–Julian oscillation, and a 40-day cycle of oscillation that results from the interaction between nonzonal air flow and the Earth's surface below.

Dickey and colleagues also found that the Earth's rotation can be influenced by weather events. They compared how two different varieties of El Niño, which each lead to different atmospheric circulation patterns, affect planetary rotation; in one variety, the warmest surface water is found in the Eastern Pacific Ocean and in the other, the peak anomaly is found in the Central Pacific Ocean. They found that the two El Niños set up different areas of higher and lower atmospheric pressure, which affect Earth's rotation differently; Eastern Pacific El Niños lengthen the day by around 0.1 milliseconds, while Central Pacific El Niños lengthen the day by 0.05 milliseconds.

=== GRACE mission ===
Dickey's work contributed to NASA's Gravity Recovery and Climate Experiment (GRACE) mission, which measured monthly variations in Earth's gravitational field over the course of 15 years. She chaired the National Academy of Sciences/National Research Council Committee on Earth Gravity from Space in 1996 and 1997. The Committee evaluated the potential for using satellite technologies to measure the time-varying component of the gravitational field, as well as assessing the utility of collecting and interpreting such measurements in order to better understand natural hazards and advance the earth sciences. The committee's work ultimately paved the way for NASA's selection of the GRACE mission during an open competition and its subsequent launch in 2002.

Earth's gravitational field is affected by changes in the masses of the ocean, the Greenland and Antarctic ice sheets, and the water stored in the continents. As water cycles among these areas, Earth's gravity fluctuates. Beginning in 1998, satellite data began to show an increasing oblateness—or flattening from a sphere to a non-spherical ellipsoid, widening the planet's diameter—in Earth's gravity field. Dickey and her colleagues sought to understand why exactly this was happening, turning their focus specifically on changes in ocean circulation, measurements of sea-surface height, and changes to sub-polar and mountain glaciers. Dickey used data collected by the GRACE Mission—which was unable to monitor Earth's gravity field with unprecedented accuracy—to better understand how factors like global warming, changing ocean circulation patterns, glacial ice melt, and changes to the composition of solid Earth affect the field of gravity. In one 2002 study, Dickey and her colleagues linked a tripling in the average rate of glacial ice melt to the flattening of the Earth and subsequent changes in its gravitational field.

=== Leadership ===
Between 1994 and 1996, she served as President of the American Geophysical Union's Geodesy section, the first woman to hold that position.

== Awards and honors ==
- International Association of Geodesy, Fellow, 1991
- First woman to deliver the Bowie Lecture at the American Geophysical Union meeting, 1993
- American Geophysical Union, Fellow, 1994
- NASA Exceptional Service Medal, 1998
- NASA Exceptional Scientific Achievement Medal, 2003
