= NASA Outstanding Service Medal =

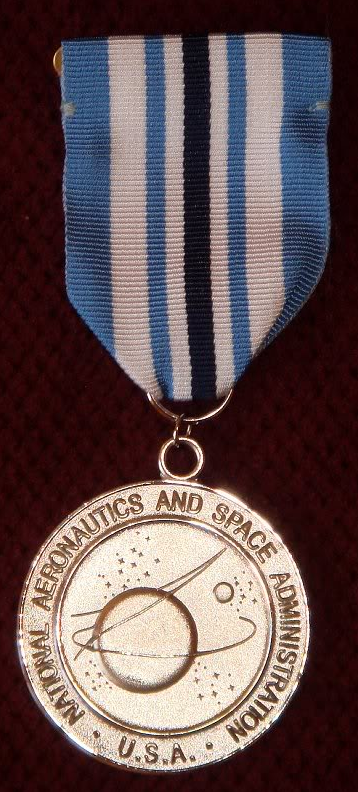
- NASA Outstanding Service Medal
- Type: Medal
- Country: United States
- Presented by: the National Aeronautics and Space Administration
- Eligibility: Government employees
- Status: Obsolete

Highlights
- Total: None known
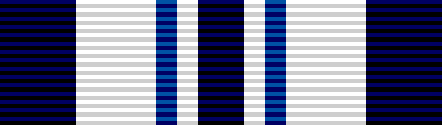
- NASA Outstanding Leadership Ribbon

Precedence
- Next (higher): Outstanding Leadership Medal
- Equivalent: Exceptional Achievement Medal; Exceptional Service Medal
- Next (lower): Exceptional Scientific Achievement Medal; Exceptional Engineering Achievement Medal; Exceptional Technology Achievement Medal; Exceptional Administrative Achievement Medal; Equal Employment Opportunity Medal

The NASA Outstanding Service Medal, now obsolete, was to be awarded to US government employees only for notably outstanding service which affected technical or administrative programs of NASA.

== See also ==
- Awards and decorations of the United States government
