= Bradley Flick =

American aerospace engineer (born 1964)

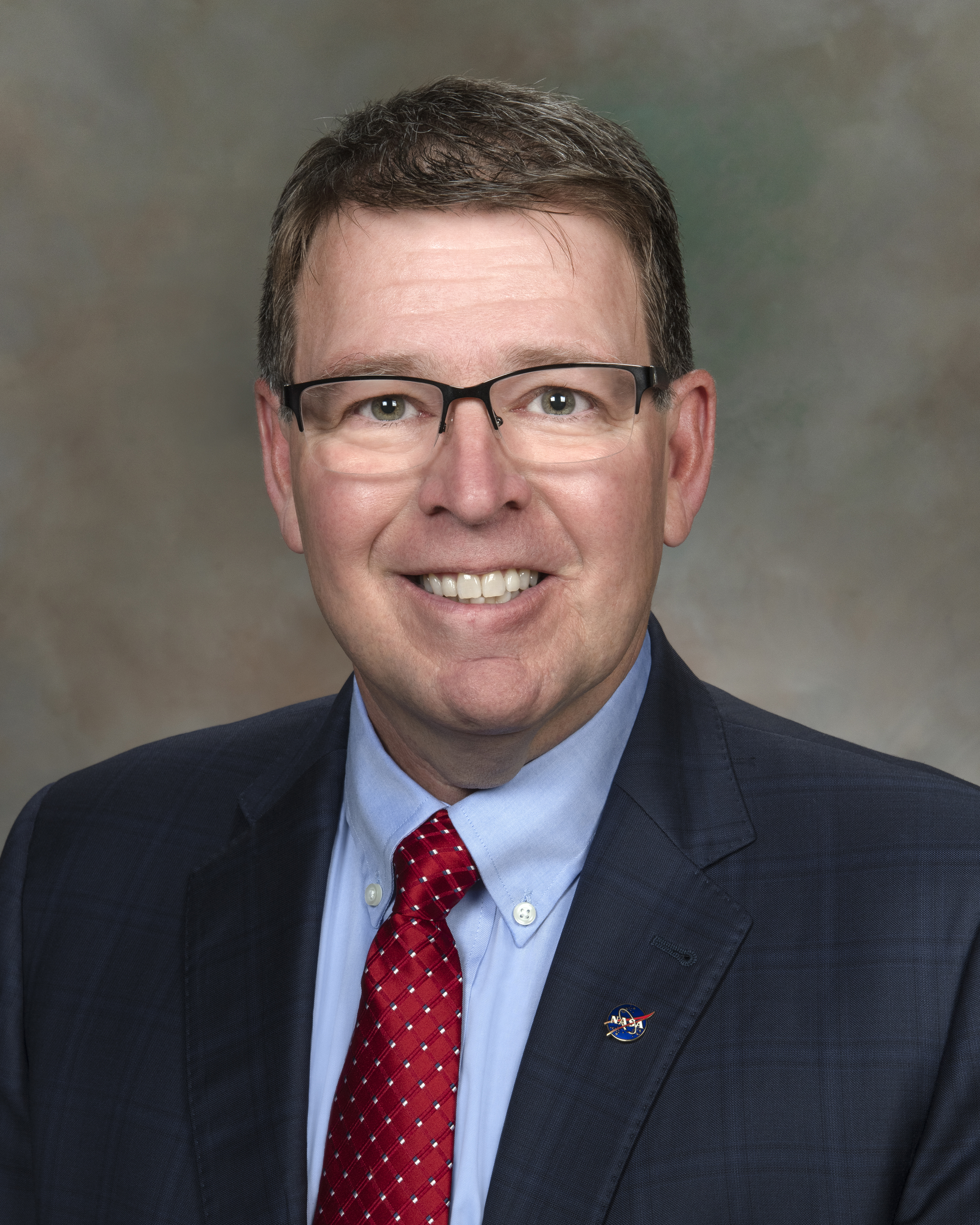
- Portrait in 2022
- Born: Bradley Curtis Flick; August 28, 1964 (age 62); New York, U.S.
- Education: Clarkson University (BS); Rochester Institute of Technology (ME)
- Occupation: Aerospace engineer
- Years active: 1986–2026
- Known for: NASA X-59

Bradley Curtis Flick (born August 28, 1964) is an American aerospace engineer. He served as director of NASA's Armstrong Flight Research Center in Edwards, California, from December 5, 2022, until his retirement on March 19, 2026.

== Early life and education ==
Flick was born in New York in 1964 to Carol and Curtis E. Flick. He earned a Bachelor of Science in electrical and computer engineering in 1986 from Clarkson University in Potsdam, New York. He later earned a Master of Engineering in engineering management in 1997 from the Rochester Institute of Technology.

== Career ==
Flick began his career at NASA's Dryden Flight Research Facility on September 15, 1986, as a flight systems engineer assigned to the F/A-18 High Alpha Research Vehicle (HARV) project. In 1988, he transferred to the Operations Engineering Branch, where he took a lead role in developing several experimental systems for the HARV project, including the thrust vectoring control system, emergency electrical and hydraulic systems, the spin recovery parachute system, and an actuated nose strake system. He served as mission controller on approximately 100 HARV research flights.

He served as chief of the Flight Systems Branch from 1998 to 2001 before being appointed associate director for flight operations, deputy director for research engineering, and director of engineering from 2001 to 2005. From October 2005 to September 2009, he served as the Dryden center chief engineer, chairing the Airworthiness and Flight Safety Review Board.

Flick became deputy center director in February 2022 and acting center director in July 2022, following the retirement of David D. McBride. On December 5, 2022, NASA Administrator Bill Nelson formally appointed him as the eleventh center director. In that role, he oversaw all aspects of management, strategy, and operations at Armstrong, one of NASA's ten field centers and the agency's lead center for atmospheric flight research, operations, and testing.

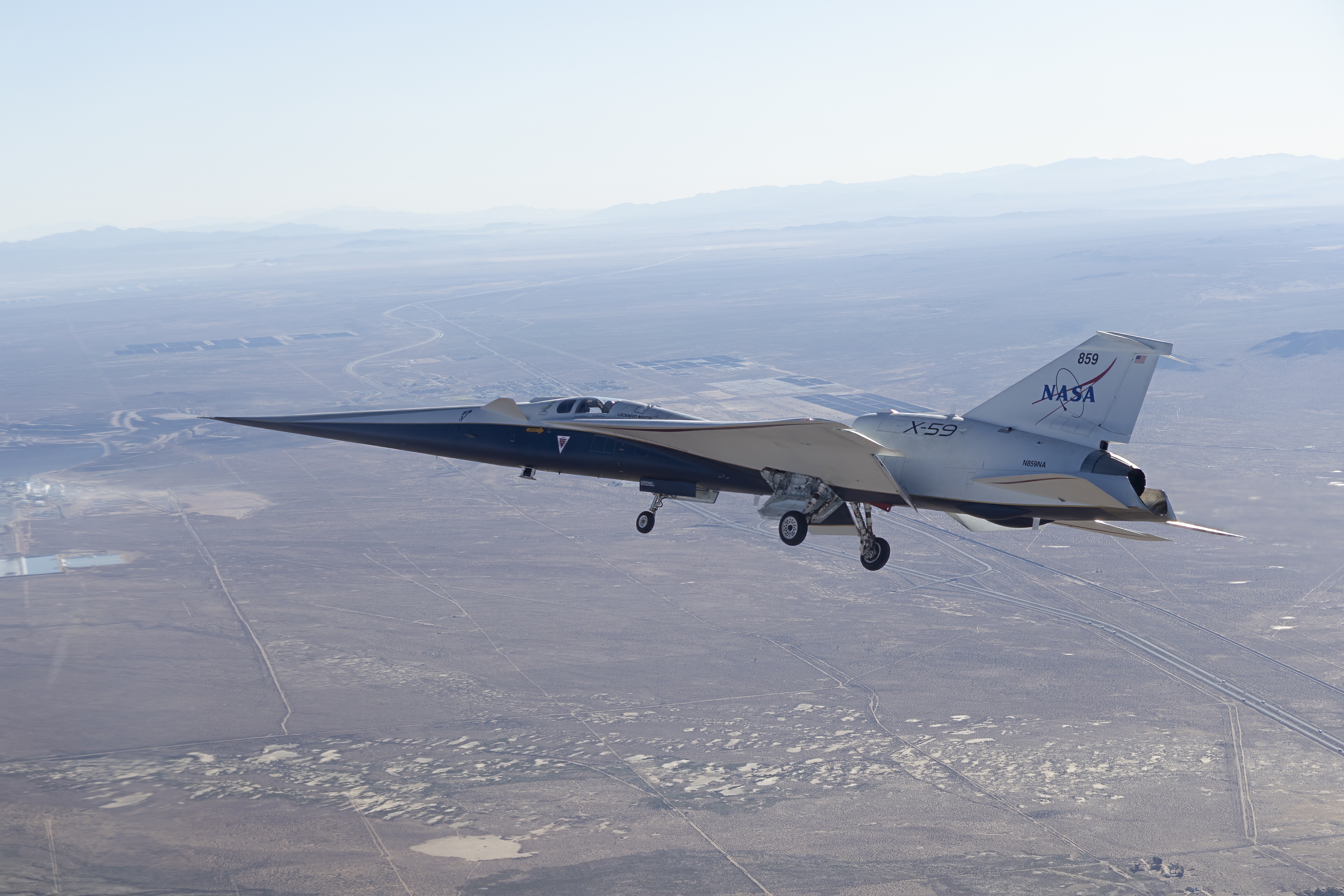
NASA X-59 flight above the Mojave

During his tenure as director, Flick oversaw the first flight of the Lockheed Martin X-59 Quesst quiet supersonic technology demonstrator, the culmination of NASA's Low Boom Flight Demonstrator program aimed at enabling commercial supersonic flight over land. Under his leadership, Armstrong also supported advances in sustainable aviation and continued development of airborne science capabilities.

He retired on March 19, 2026, after nearly 40 years of service. His service was recognized by NASA administrator Jared Isaacman and by Vince Fong, representative of California's 20th congressional district, in the U.S. House Of Representatives on March 9.

== Awards ==
- Presidential Rank Award for Meritorious Executive (2015)
