= NASA Exceptional Administrative Achievement Medal =

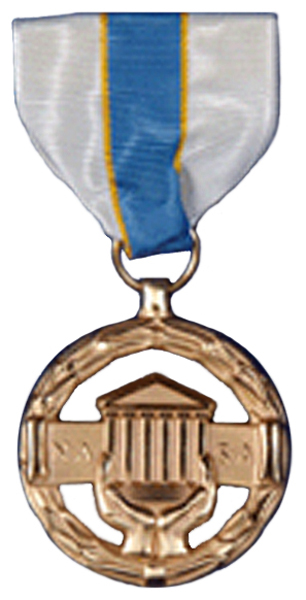
- NASA Exceptional Administrative Achievement Medal
- Type: Medal
- Country: United States
- Presented by: the National Aeronautics and Space Administration
- Eligibility: Federal government employees only
- Status: Active
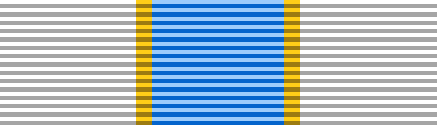
- Exceptional Administrative Achievement Ribbon

Precedence
- Next (higher): Exceptional Achievement Medal; Exceptional Service Medal; Outstanding Service Medal (obsolete)
- Equivalent: Exceptional Scientific Achievement Medal; Exceptional Engineering Achievement Medal; Exceptional Technology Achievement Medal; Equal Employment Opportunity Medal
- Next (lower): Exceptional Bravery Medal

The NASA Exceptional Administrative Achievement Medal is an award given by NASA to any person in the United States federal service for a significant, specific accomplishment or contribution characterized by unusual initiative or creativity that clearly demonstrates a substantial improvement in administrative support contributing to the mission of NASA, such as:

- Exceptional initiative in carrying out office/program support activities that resulted in improved processes and operations.
- Development and improvement of administrative support methods and processes that resulted in substantial benefit to the office or program.
- Notable competence and resourcefulness in accomplishing and improving office/program processes and operations.

== See also ==
- List of NASA awards
