= Michael Ashley (astronomer) =

Australian astronomer

Michael C. B. Ashley
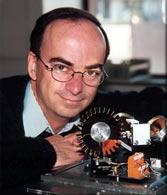
- Known for: Dome C seeing qualities
- Scientific career
- Fields: Astrophysics, astronomy
- Institutions: University of New South Wales

Michael C. B. Ashley is an Australian astronomer and professor in the school of physics at the University of New South Wales (UNSW), in Sydney. He is most famous for his work in Antarctica, with the study of the seeing capability at Dome C.

== Education ==
Ashley graduated in 1981 as BSc from Australian National University, in 1983 as MSc in astrophysics from Caltech, and in 1989 as PhD in astronomy. While completing his PhD, he worked as a consultant on the Endeavour project (an ultraviolet imaging experiment on the Space Shuttle) and worked at the Anglo-Australian Observatory as a research assistant.

== Career ==
After graduating in 1989, Ashley joined the faculty of the School of Physics, UNSW.

=== Antarctica and Dome C ===
Ashley has led teams to Antarctica on four separate trips, in 1995, 1998, 2001, and 2004 to conduct experiments and take measurements of the near-infrared quality and brightness of the sky.

In September 2004, Nature published a report written by Jon Lawrence, Michael Ashley, Andrei Tokovinin, and Tony Travouillon on the seeing abilities of astronomical telescopes in Antarctica. The paper concluded that the area known as "Dome C" would be "the best ground-based site to develop a new astronomical observatory". The data used in this report was collected by a remote control experiment run through the French-Italian Concordia Station near Dome C.

It was found that pictures taken from a telescope at Dome C are, on average, 2.5 times better than those taken at observatories elsewhere. This discovery has been lauded as finding the clearest skies on Earth.

== Publications ==
As of January 2025, Scopus lists 230 academic papers written by Ashley, and calculates his h-index as 39, while Google Scholar calculates his h-index as 54.
