= Kevin L. Petersen =

American aerospace engineer (born 1951)

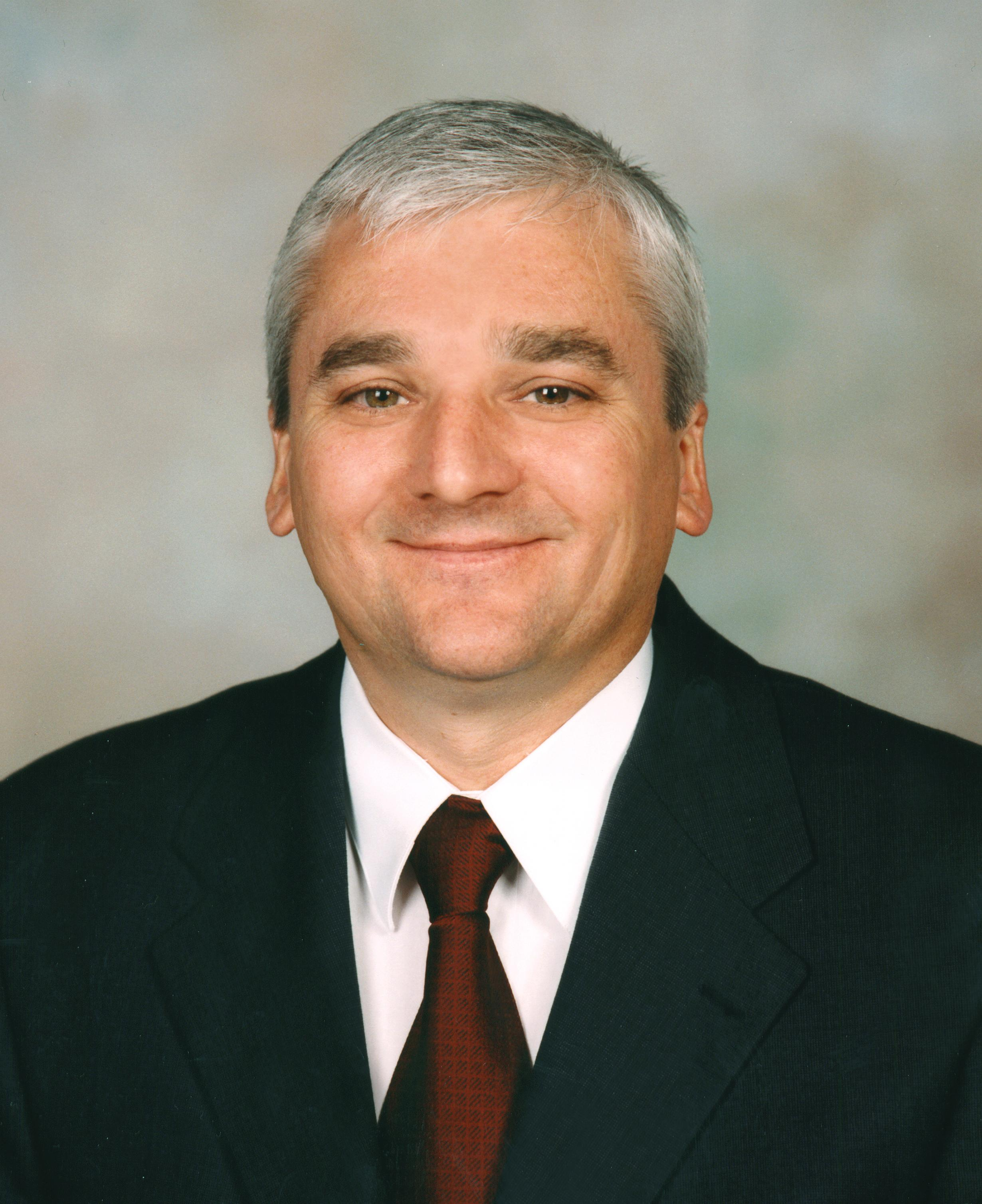
- Portrait in 1998
- Born: October 4, 1951 (age 74); LeMars, Iowa, U.S.
- Education: Iowa State University (BS); UCLA (MS)
- Occupation: Aerospace engineer
- Years active: 1971-2009
- Awards: NASA Outstanding Leadership Medal

Kevin L. Petersen (born October 4, 1951) is an American aerospace engineer. He was director of NASA Dryden Flight Research Center from 1999 to 2009, where he served as chief engineer for the experimental X-29 forward-swept wing aircraft and led the X-30 program. He was awarded the NASA Outstanding Leadership Medal in 2000.

== Early life and education ==
Petersen was born in LeMars, Iowa in 1951. He attended Iowa State University, where he earned a Bachelor of Science in aerospace engineering in 1974. He later earned a Master of Science at the University of California, Los Angeles (UCLA), where he specialized in aerospace control systems and published research on remotely piloted research vehicles. In 1979, he completed a one-year graduate engineering program at Stanford University.

== Career ==
In his second year of college, Petersen began his career at NASA as a university co-op student in 1971. After his graduation, he was hired to work at Dryden Flight Research Center as a research engineer on the McDonnell Douglas F-15A three-eighths scale Remotely Piloted Research Vehicle. He also worked on digital fly-by-wire for the Vought F-8 Crusader and the Highly Maneuverable Aircraft Technology project.

At Dryden's Research Engineering Division, he later served as chief of the Dynamics and Controls Branch and specialized in flight dynamics, control systems, and structural dynamics. He supported the McDonnell Douglas F-18 High Angle of Attack Research Vehicle and served as chief engineer on the experimental Grumman X-29, a swept wing technology demonstration. In February 1992, he began heading the Rockwell X-30 National AeroSpace Plane project until November 1993.

Petersen became deputy director of Dryden in January 1996, and acting director on August 1, 1998, after Kenneth J. Szalai. He served as the ninth director of the NASA center from February 8, 1999, until his retirement on April 3, 2009. Under his direction, Dryden transitioned from a field center primarily focused on aeronautics research and support for the space shuttle program to a major research center supporting each of NASA's four mission disciplines, including space science, space exploration, human spaceflight, and experimental aeronautics.

Under Petersen, Dryden flew the NASA X-43A integrated scramjet to a record of Mach 9.6 in 2004, flew the AeroVironment Helios Prototype solar-electric aircraft to an altitude of 96,863 ft (29,524 m), and demonstrated autonomous in-flight aerial refueling. On January 15, 2009, NASA debuted the use of Northrop Grumman's autonomous high-altitude, long-endurance Global Hawk aircraft for use in environmental science research. Petersen remarked that it was "NASA's newest airborne science capability" and marked "the first non-military use" of the robotic system through a partnership between Northrop Grumman and the NASA ERAST Program. Dryden also became the development and operation center for the Stratospheric Observatory for Infrared Astronomy (SOFIA) project and the Crew Exploration Vehicle.

At the time of his retirement, he was the longest-serving field center director at NASA. He had 38 years of experience at Dryden when he was succeeded by David D. McBride. Petersen is a distinguished alumnus of Iowa State University and a fellow of the American Institute of Aeronautics and Astronautics (AIAA).

== Awards ==
- NASA Exceptional Engineering Achievement Medal (1985)
- NASA Exceptional Service Medal (1987)
- NASA Outstanding Leadership Medal (2000)
- NASA Equal Employment Opportunity Medal (2001)
- NASA Exceptional Achievement Medal (2004)
