= NASA Exceptional Bravery Medal =

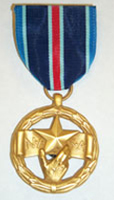
- NASA Exceptional Bravery Medal
- Type: Medal
- Country: United States
- Presented by: the National Aeronautics and Space Administration
- Eligibility: Government employees and non-government personnel
- Status: Active
- Established: July 29, 1959
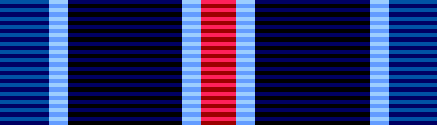
- NASA Exceptional Bravery Ribbon

Precedence
- Next (higher): Exceptional Scientific Achievement Medal; Exceptional Engineering Achievement Medal; Exceptional Technology Achievement Medal; Exceptional Administrative Achievement Medal; Equal Employment Opportunity Medal
- Next (lower): Exceptional Public Service Medal

The NASA Exceptional Bravery Medal is a NASA award for exemplary and courageous handling of an emergency by an individual who, independent of personal danger, has acted to prevent the loss of human life or U.S. government property. The award is open to government and non-government employees.

The first 6 medals were awarded and presented May 8, 1963, by NASA Associate Director Dr. Robert Seamons to Paul J. Balfe, John A. Gordon, Larry J. Hough, Curtis C. Lyon, Charles L. Manes and Lynn B. Rowe. On November 9, 1962, NASA pilot Jack B. McKay was test flying an X-15 when it experienced engine failure. An emergency landing was made at Mud Lake, Nevada, where the aircraft flipped on its back. As part of the rescue crew, these 6 men worked to free McKay in the presence of lethal concentrations of unjettisoned anhydrous ammonia fuel, saving McKay's life.

Exceptional Bravery Medals were awarded in 1969 to NASA engineers Bill B. McClure and Charles J. "Jack" Beverlin, who prevented the collapse and explosion of an Atlas rocket at great risk to their own lives. A feature on Mars was later named after them.

Medals were also awarded to Herbert W. Grandy in 1970, and to Paul D. Sebesta in 1974. Subsequently, thirty eight workers at the Michoud Assembly Facility were awarded this medal for protecting the facility from flooding due to Hurricane Katrina in 2005.

== See also ==
- List of NASA awards
