= NASA Exceptional Technology Achievement Medal =

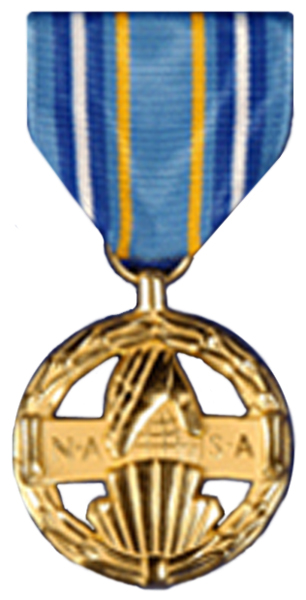
- NASA Exceptional Technology Achievement Medal
- Type: Medal
- Country: United States
- Presented by: the National Aeronautics and Space Administration
- Eligibility: Government employees and non-government personnel
- Status: Active
- Established: September 15, 1961
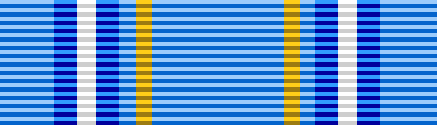
- NASA Exceptional Technology Achievement Ribbon

Precedence
- Next (higher): Exceptional Achievement Medal; Exceptional Service Medal; Outstanding Service Medal (obsolete)
- Equivalent: Exceptional Scientific Achievement Medal; Exceptional Engineering Achievement Medal; Exceptional Administrative Achievement Medal; Equal Employment Opportunity Medal
- Next (lower): Exceptional Bravery Medal

The NASA Exceptional Technology Achievement Medal is an award given for technology contributions achieved in one of the following:

- Early technology development significantly contributing to the NASA mission
- Exemplary collaborative effort in achieving significant technology transfer
- Exceptional utilization of a NASA-developed technology resulting in a significant commercial application

== See also ==
- List of NASA awards
