= NASA Exceptional Engineering Achievement Medal =

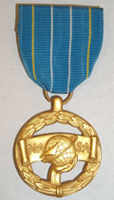
- NASA Exceptional Engineering Achievement Medal
- Type: Medal
- Country: United States
- Presented by: the National Aeronautics and Space Administration
- Eligibility: Government employees and non-government personnel
- Status: Active
- Established: 1981
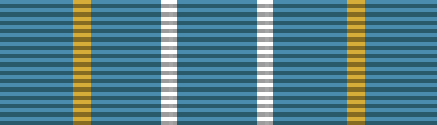
- NASA Exceptional Engineering Achievement Ribbon

Precedence
- Next (higher): Exceptional Achievement Medal; Exceptional Service Medal; Outstanding Service Medal (obsolete)
- Equivalent: Exceptional Scientific Achievement Medal; Exceptional Technology Achievement Medal; Exceptional Administrative Achievement Medal; Equal Employment Opportunity Medal
- Next (lower): Exceptional Bravery Medal

The NASA Exceptional Engineering Achievement Medal (abbreviated EEAM) was established by NASA in 1981 to recognize unusually significant engineering contributions towards achievement of aeronautical or space exploration goals. This award is given for individual efforts for applications of engineering principles or methods that have resulted in a contribution of fundamental importance in this field or have significantly enhanced understanding of this field or have significantly advanced the state of the practice as demonstrated by an application to aerospace systems.

== Recent recipients ==
=== 1985 ===
Kevin L. Petersen

=== 1998 ===
Donald B. Bickler

=== 2006 ===
2006 award recipients include:

- Claude A. Bryant
- Keyur C. Patel
- Frank J. Vaughn
- Walter C. Engelund
- Donald R. Pettit
- Russell A. Wincheski
- John P. McManamen
- John W. Slater
- Russell A. Paielli
- James L. Walker
- Steven Z. Queen

=== 2007 ===
2007 award recipients include:

- James Baughman
- Kendall Brown
- Steven Fredrickson
- Charles Harris
- Michael Kirsch
- Chia-Yen Peng
- Scott Berry
- Michael Burms
- Lawrence Freudinger
- Eastwood Im
- Joseph Lavelle
- Todd Bonalsky
- K. Cramer
- Robert Hall
- David Iverson
- Pappu Murthy
- Shannon Bragg-Sitton
- John Edwards
- Steven Harrah
- Steven Jones
- Shahana Pagen

=== 2008 ===
2008 award recipients include:

- W. Keith Belvin
- Charles Camarda
- Dennis J. Eichenberg
- Stephen F. Harvin
- Roger Mattson
- Stephen Scotti
- John A. Wagner
- Thomas F. Zoladz
- Jeffrey S. Boyer
- Rebecca Castano
- Ronald M. Galvez
- Dan Jackson
- Robert E. McMurray
- Stephen Snodgrass
- William P. Winfree
- John R. Brophy
- Brian K. Cooper
- Thomas W. Goodnight
- William A. Kilgore
- Patrick F. Morrissey
- Ashitey Trebi-Ollennu
- Michael J. Wright
- Jay Brusse
- Lyle T. Davis
- George R. Harpster
- David J. Mangus
- David J. Pogue
- Glenn Rakow
- Katherine P. Vanhooser
- Pen-Shu Yeh

=== 2009 ===
2009 award recipients include:

- Ayman A. Abdallah
- Shawn P. Breeding
- Prasun N. Desai
- Mark G. Femminineo
- Lorie R. Grimes-Ledesma
- Jonathan E. Jones
- Mary J. Li
- Daniel L. Polis
- Michael J. Schuh
- John M. Van Eepoel
- Shannon J. Zelinski
- Mark A. Balzer
- Chad B. Bryant
- Theodore R. Drain
- Gerard Floyd
- Scott Hensley
- Dennis L. Kern
- Frank S. Milos
- John K. Ramsey
- Regina L. Spellman
- Philip R. Ward
- Thomas G. Bialas
- James M. Corliss
- Michael J. Dube
- Dion T. Fralick
- Brent W. Jett
- Won S. Kim
- Bo J. Naasz
- Giulio Rosanova
- Thomas R. Stevenson
- Harold D. Wiedemuth
- Richard K. Bird
- Michael J. Deliz
- Sandra K. Elam
- Gani B. Ganapathi
- William T. K. Johnson
- Raymond J. Lanzi
- Allen R. Parker
- Dara Sabahi
- Oscar Toledo
- Thomas C. Williams

=== 2010 ===
2010 award recipients include:

- Timothy C. Adams
- Steve N. Beck
- Ed Cheung
- Myron A. Diftler
- Thomas Friedmann
- Martin B. Houghton
- Eugene A. Morelli
- Paul W. Roberts
- James Taylor
- Dennis Albaijes
- Daniel L. Berry
- D. Steven Cooley
- Marcia S. Domack
- Daniel B. Gazda
- Young K. Kim
- David E. Myers
- Jose I. Rodriguez
- John C. Thesken
- Christian C. Bechtold
- Kevin R. Boyce
- Mark G. D’Agostino
- Richard E. Dyke
- Michael G. Gilbert
- Darlene S. Lee
- Janiene Pape
- Don J. Roth
- Jirong Yu
- Robin A. Beck
- Scott C. Burleigh
- Paul M. Danehy
- David F. Everett
- Mark W. Hilburger
- Joseph C. Lewiz
- John C. Pearson
- Henry P. Sampler
- Daniel E. Yuchnovicz

=== 2011 ===
2011 award recipients include:

- Xin An
- Jay Brandon
- William M. Cirillo
- Robert Fong
- Charles E. Hall
- David G. Johnson
- Justin H. Kerr
- Jeffrey L. Lindner
- Fred G. Martwick
- Bijan Nemati
- Mark A. Stephen
- Nathan C. Wood
- Robert J. Black
- Stephen T. Bryson
- Anthony L. Cook
- Bryan Fraser
- Richard R. Hofer
- Ira Katz
- Denney J. Keys
- Alok K. Majumdar
- Ioannis G. Mikellides
- Jeffrey R. Piepmeier
- John S. Townsend
- Ping Y. Yu
- Kristin L. Bourkland
- Hon M. Chan
- Kimberly B. Demoret
- Dan M. Goebel
- Megan K. Jaunich
- Sotirios Kellas
- Todd Klaus
- Gregory C. Marr
- Kathleen Andreozzi Minear
- Mark Schoenenberger
- Albert C. Whittlesey
- Randy R. Bowman
- Steven R. Chesley
- Thomas P. Flatley
- Karen L. Gundy-Burlet
- Wayne A. Jermstad
- Daniel P. Kelly
- Dzu K. Le
- Dr. G. Patrick Martin
- Nelson Morales
- V. S. Scott
- Donna V. Wilson

=== 2012 ===
2012 award recipients include:

- Sasan C. Armand
- Robert B. Ciotti
- Omar A. Haddad
- Michael G. Houts
- Sean D. McCauliff
- Craig R. Pires
- Michael S. Woronowicz
- Ponnampalam Balakumar
- Douglas D. Counter
- Douglas Hamilton
- Jeffery Kolodziejczak
- Donald B. Owens
- Sriram Rallabhandi
- Michael E. Yettaw
- Steven X. Bauer
- Brett A. Cruden
- James T. Heineck
- Jer C. Liou
- Grant E. Palmer
- Patrick A. Tobbe
- James A. Chervenak
- Bob Downing
- Gerard Holzmann
- Duncan MacPherson
- Peter A. Parker
- David H. Williams

=== 2013 ===
2013 award recipients include:

- Phillip A. Allen
- Philip C. Calhoun
- Samuel B. Fowler
- Louise Jandura
- Carl Liebe
- Benjamin J. Pearson
- Edward T. Schairer
- Christopher V. Voorhees
- Daniel C. Allgood
- Benjamin D. Cichy
- William J. Glaccum
- Roy R. Johnson
- David M. O'Dell
- Keith Peterson
- Peter J. Shirron
- Jeffrey S. West
- Steven F. Balistreri
- Patrick H. Dunlap
- Ken Hersey
- John T. Kaneshige
- Jeb Stuart Orr
- Tommaso P. Rivellini
- Eric M. Slimko
- Todd White
- Kevin E. Berry
- Rodger E. Farley
- Russell W. James
- Bradford Kercheval
- Hume L. Peabody
- Alejandro Miguel San Martin
- Shaun R. Thomson
- David A. Zoller

=== 2014 ===
2014 award recipients include:

- Michael J. Aftosmis
- Gajanana C. Birur
- Michael G. Burns
- William J. Downs
- Stephen D. Hunter
- Erich F. Klein
- Christopher Miller
- Robin J. Osborne
- John M. Van Eepoel
- Gary A. Allen, Jr.
- Albion H. Bowers
- Nathan J. Burnside
- Stuart D. Glazer
- Jeffrey M. Jaso
- James C. Knox
- Marcus S. Murbach
- Timothy J. Ray
- Douglas N. Wells
- Anthony P. Bartolone
- Aaron M. Brandis
- Andrew J. Cecil
- Michael R. Hannan
- Ralph Jones
- Dmitry G. Luchinsky
- Thomas E. Nolan
- Donald V. Sullivan
- William A. Wood
- Mehdi Benna
- Nelson A. Brown
- Jeffrey Cheezum
- David B. Harper
- Peter E. Kascak
- Pamela A. McVeigh
- Salvatore M. Oriti
- John M. Tota
- Tony Yu

=== 2015 ===
2015 award recipients include:

- Cecil W. Acree
- Sundareswara Balakrishna
- Gregory L. Barnett
- Karen L. Bibb
- Arthur T. Bradley
- Jeffrey S. Brink
- Robert J. Bruckner
- Donald L. Carter
- Benjamin D. Cichy
- Eric C. Dimpault-Darcy
- Tammy D. Flowers
- Ulrik B. Gliese
- Michael H. Haddock
- Philip J. Hamory
- Patricia A. Howell
- Thomas P. Jasin
- Timothy J. Ray
- Robert J. Kenny
- Michael P. Kovach
- Lisa M. Ling
- Forrest E. Lumpkin
- Diego F. Pierrottet
- David L. Pletcher
- Steven Z. Queen
- Stuart E. Rogers
- Alan M. Schwing
- David A. Sheppard
- Robert W. Stough
- Sean S. Swei
- Chun Y. Tang
- Paulo F. Uribe
- Donald E. Van Drei
- Gary K. Won

=== 2016 ===
2016 award recipients include:

- Morgan B. Abney
- Jeffrey L. Coughlin
- Paul S. Kinard
- Christopher I. Morris
- Mark V. Vaccaro
- John W. Van Norman

=== 2017 ===
2017 award recipients include:

- James R. Beaty
- Gaudy M. Bezos-Oconnor
- William T. Jones
- Christopher D. Karlgaard
- Thomas A. Ozoroski

=== 2018 ===
2018 award recipients:

- Jessie L. Christiansen
- Theodore J. Garbeff
- Cole D. Kazemba
- Jayanta Panda
- Stefan R. Schuet
- Zion W. Young

=== 2020 ===
2020 award recipients:

- Peter P. Berg
- Matthew F. Cross
- Jeffrey A. Dilg
- Karen C. Hicks
- David M. McCutcheon
- David M. O'Dell
- Alan F. Patterson
- Barry C. Roberts
- James J. Wilson

== See also ==
- List of NASA awards
