= NASA Equal Employment Opportunity Medal =

NASA award

- NASA Equal Employment Opportunity Medal
- Type: Medal
- Country: United States
- Presented by: the National Aeronautics and Space Administration
- Eligibility: Government employees and non-government personnel
- Status: Active
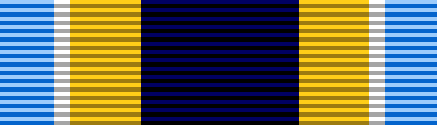
- NASA Equal Employment Opportunity Ribbon

Precedence
- Next (higher): Exceptional Achievement Medal; Exceptional Service Medal; Outstanding Service Medal (obsolete)
- Equivalent: Exceptional Scientific Achievement Medal; Exceptional Engineering Achievement Medal; Exceptional Technology Achievement Medal; Administrative Achievement Medal
- Next (lower): Exceptional Bravery Medal

The NASA Equal Employment Opportunity Medal is an award given to both government employees and non-government personnel for outstanding achievement and material contribution to the goals of NASA’s Equal Employment Opportunity Programs either within government, community organizations, or groups.

== Notable recipients ==
=== 2001 ===
- Kevin L. Petersen

== See also ==
- List of NASA awards
