= Anne R. Douglass =

Atmospheric physicist

- Born: Anne Ritger
- Scientific career
- Thesis: A model of the Antarctic sink for stratospheric water vapor (1980)
- Doctoral advisor: John Stanford

Anne Ritger Douglass is atmospheric physicist known for her research on chlorinated compounds and the ozone layer.

== Education and career ==
Douglass graduated with a B.A.in physics from Trinity, now Trinity Washington University, in 1971. She then earned a M.S. in physics from the University of Minnesota (1975), where she was the only woman in her cohort. She earned a Ph.D. in physics in 1980 from Iowa State University. In 1981, she joined the staff at National Aeronautics and Space Administration's Goddard Space Flight Center. In 2014, Douglass described science as her passion with a note that "You have to love what you do." She began a phased retirement from NASA in 2017.

== Research ==
Douglass used satellite measurements from NASA's Upper Atmosphere Research Satellite (UARS) platform to define the mode of production for reaction chlorine species, to globally map these ozone-depleting chlorine compounds, and to model differences in the formation of atmospheric chlorine reservoirs between the northern and southern hemispheres. Douglass is the co-lead for NASA Goddard Earth Observing System Chemistry Climate Model (GEOSCCM) which enables modeling of atmospheric temperatures and ozone hole. Douglass has modeled the annual cycle and transport of ozone in the atmosphere. Her model on the movement of chlorofluorocarbons (CFCs) in the atmosphere has implications for what would have happened to the ozone layer in the absence of international agreements to reduce atmospheric CFCs levels.

Douglass was the co-lead of the validation program for NASA's Aura satellite which is designed to collect data on ozone, climate, and air quality. In 2010, Douglass took over the project scientist position. The ozone data collected by the Aura satellites plays a key role in ozone assessments which guides Douglass's participation in the Montreal Protocol. In 2018, Douglass's research shows decreases in ozone depletion above Antarctica which indicates an improvement in the ozone hole that may fully heal by 2070.

== Awards and honors ==
- Fellow, American Meteorological Society (1998)
- Fellow, American Geophysical Union (2007)
- Exceptional Scientific Achievement Medal, NASA (2009)
- Outstanding Leadership Medal, NASA (2012)
- William Nordberg Memorial Award for Earth Science, Goddard Space Flight Center's highest award in the Earth Sciences (2013)

== Personal life ==
Douglass has five children, enjoys yoga and tap dancing, and was a Girl Scout leader while her children were young. Douglass discusses the challenges of balancing a career and children in her contribution to Motherhood: The Elephant in the Laboratory.
