= NASA Exceptional Public Service Medal =

NASA Public Service Medal
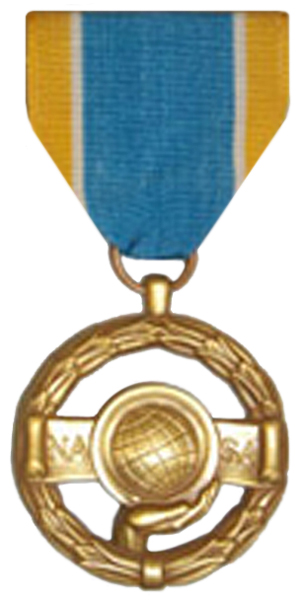
- NASA Exceptional Public Service Medal (EPSM)
- Type: Medal
- Awarded for: Exceptional contributions to the mission of NASA
- Country: United States
- Presented by: the National Aeronautics and Space Administration
- Eligibility: Non-government personnel
- Status: Active
- Established: July 29, 1959
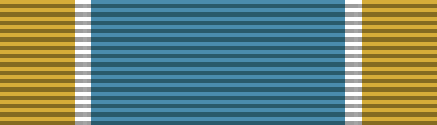
- NASA Public Service Ribbon

Precedence
- Next (higher): Exceptional Bravery Medal
- Next (lower): Space Flight Medal

NASA's Exceptional Public Service Medal is a United States government award awarded to any non-Government individual or to an individual who was not a Government employee during the period in which the service was performed for sustained performance that embodies multiple contributions on NASA projects, programs, or initiatives.

The criteria must include all of the following:

- Sustained performance has made a significant improvement to NASA deliverables, operations, or image;
- Employee's record of achievements sets a benchmark for other non-Government contributors to follow; substantial improvement to a NASA program that yielded high quality results or improvements;
- Impact and importance of the employee's services have made a lasting impact on the success of the Agency

== See also ==
- NASA Distinguished Public Service Medal
- NASA Public Service Group Award
- List of NASA awards

== EPSM Awardees ==
=== 2024 ===
==== Ames Research Center ====
- John J. Freitas (OCOMM Nomination)
- Michael J. Hirschberg

==== Glenn Research Center ====
- Jacob Chung, professor in the Department of Mechanical and Aerospace Engineering, University of Florida, for exceptional, sustained, and multi-faceted contributions advancing NASA's in-space cryogenic fluid management science and technologies over multiple programs and 30 years.

==== Goddard Space Flight Center ====
- Aaron Lepsch, For excellence in building a multimedia IT systems supporting NASA storytellers and leading the way forward on the Agency's creative infrastructure.
- John O'Meara

==== Johnson Space Center ====
- Belinda Gay (Patricia Huffman Smith NASA Museum 'Remembering Columbia'), For outstanding dedication and contributions to the NASA community for Space Shuttle Columbia recovery efforts and the commemoration of Columbia’s historical significance.
- Marsha Cooper (Patricia Huffman Smith NASA Museum 'Remembering Columbia'), For exceptional public service as a member of the first search team of communication efforts coordinator during the recovery operation for the Space Shuttle Columbia accident.
- Dr. Estella Hernández Gillette (NASA Alumni League – JSC Chapter). For embodying with exceptional grace and timeless devotion, unwavering dedication, selflessness, and commitment to public service.

=== 2023 ===
==== Ames Research Center ====
- Mike Hirschberg, Director of Strategy of Vertical Flight Society, For exceptional international leadership and advocacy of vertical lift technologies and aggressive support of advanced air mobility development and workplace diversity.

==== Glenn Research Center ====
- Matthew Pitsch

==== Johnson Space Center ====
- Daniel Connor, research engineering manager for the University of Alabama at Birmingham School of Engineering’s Engineering and Innovative Technology Development group.

==== Marshall Research Center ====
- William C. Butler (Exploration Project & Integration Office, ESSCA)
- Robin C. Ferebee (Propulsion Structures & Design Branch, ESSCA)
- Robert L. Goodwin (Avionics Integration Branch, ESSCA)
- Bruce T. LaVerde (Structural Dynamics and Integration Branch, ESSCA)
- Randy Lycans (Technical Performance & Integration Office, ESSCA)
- Phat T. Nguyen (MAF Integrations & Operations, SYNCOM SPACE SERVICES)
- Tamra A. Ozbolt (Stages Office, Consolidated Program Support Services)
- Andrew P. Tygielski (Systems Integration Branch, ESSCA)
- Michael Ward (Alabama Huntsville/Madison County Chamber of Commerce)
- Terry L. White (Program Operations & Strategic Communications, Media Fusion)
- David L. Wineland (Engines Office, Aerojet Rocketdyne)

==== Goddard Space Flight Center ====
- Jose Vanderlei Martins
- Scott Friedman
- Libby Larson

==== Stennis Space Center ====
- Rodney W. King, SACOM, For his professionalism, work ethic, can-do spirit, and for outstanding leadership and commitment to excellence demonstrated throughout his career.

=== 2022 ===
- Heidi Hammel, AURA Vice President for Science, Interdisciplinary Scientist for the James Webb Space Telescope, and Vice President of the Board of Directors of the Planetary Society, for an exemplary career in service to NASA and to the planetary science community.

==== Glenn Research Center ====
- Ronald C. Moomaw DO
- Jennifer A. Baumeister
- Alexandra M. Bowersox
- Jacob R. Bramley
- Larry F. Hambley
- Michael L. Harper
- Lyle Lilie

==== Marshall Space Flight Center ====
- Mary K. Cutting, Earth Science Branch, Jacobs Space Exploration Group/ESSCA
- Christian N. Garcia, Control Systems Design and Analysis Branch, Jacobs Space Exploration Group/ESSCA
- Sandra K. George, Communication Services Office, AEGIS
- William S. Paciesas, Universities Space Research Association
- Blake W. Parker, Payload and Crew Operations Branch, MOSSI2
- Jennifer R. Robinson, Structural Design, Development and Analysis Branch, Jacobs Space Exploration Group/ESSCA
- Carol M. Sivley, Technical Performance and Integration Office, MIPPS CMDM
- Dale R. Taglilatelo, TVC Systems Integration and Components, Jacobs Space Exploration Group/ESSCA
- David D. Waller, Transportation and Logistics Engineering Office, MLSS

=== 2021 ===
- David Spergel, Emeritus Professor of Astrophysical Sciences at Princeton University for outstanding leadership of the Nancy Grace Roman Space Telescope’s teams during its initial mission concept and formulation program.
- Rob Ferl, distinguished professor in the UF/IFAS horticultural sciences department and assistant vice president for UF research.

==== Glenn Research Center ====
- Deborah L. Demaline
- Christopher J. Detardo
- Paul V. Ferkul
- Paul W. Giel
- Robert L. Norman
- Phillip A. Oberhaus
- Marvin G. Smith

==== Langley Research Center ====
- Vinay Goyal, Principal Director at The Aerospace Corporation, Deputy Technical Fellow at NASA, Adjunct Professor of Practice at University of California Los Angeles and University of Southern California: For outstanding engineering support to safety of flight assessments, methodology development, and engineering analyses of critical interest to NASA and its missions.

==== Marshall Space Flight Center ====
- Steven L. Hough, For superior and sustained technical leadership of flight control design, development, and evaluation for all Space Launch System upper stages.
- Barbara A. Maples, For outstanding leadership, technical expertise, and communication skills while serving as a subject matter expert for the POIC to MCC-H Interfaces.
- William H. Muddle, For exemplary leadership in execution of SSME post-flight operations and adaptation and integration of RS-25 engine operations and logistics requirements into the SLS Program.
- Douglas A. Swartz, For unceasing support of critical NASA X-ray missions, including the Chandra X-ray Observatory and the Lynx X-ray Observatory concept, and the mentoring of future scientists.
- Richard L. Webb, For superior performance in the field of launch vehicle economic analysis and exceptional support to the Space Launch System Program.

=== 2020 ===
- Justin Cassidy
- Curtis Fatif
- Tilak Hewagama
- Dennis Hewitt
- Clifton Jackson
- Donald Penney
- Francis Reddy
- Erin Robinson
- Michelle Smith
- James Storey
- Clemens Tillier
- Terry Traina

==== Glenn Research Center ====
- Margarita Aponte
- Paul A. Catalano
- Gregory P. Frederick
- Richard J. Kearney
- Arnold Kuchenmeist

==== Marshall Space Flight Center ====
- Michael S. Briggs, For outstanding, critical, prior and ongoing contributions to the unilateral success of the Fermi Mission and the Fermi Gamma-ray Burst Monitor Project.
- Murel T. Chapman, For exceptional service and personal dedication in support of NASA’s SLS and Lunar Lander Programs by providing extraordinary institutional services to MSFC.
- James T. Garner, For sustained exceptional service in the performance of systems engineering and integrations for the Space Launch System Stages element.
- Brian K. Hastings, For continuous exceptional service, mentoring, and leadership of the Mechanical Test Team in support of NASA missions and goals.

=== 2019 ===
==== Goddard Space Flight Center ====
- Carolus J. Schrijver, for demonstrating scientific excellence through outstanding leadership and dedication in support of NASA Heliophysics missions and the impact to the community.
- Richard W. Eastes, for successfully implementing NASA’s first hosted payload mission and for significant and lasting scientific contributions to atmospheric and space physics.
- David J. Krause, In recognition of decades of excellence and service in engineering, process development, and capability enhancement on the NASA Sounding Rocket Program.
- Roy L. Fox, Jr., for sustained, significant contributions to parachute systems design and test for human and interplanetary spacecraft delivering hardware to Earth, Mars, and Jupiter.
- Kamal Oudrhiri.

==== Glenn Research Center ====
- Michael D. Cuy
- John M. Dearmon
- Jeanine P. Hanzel
- Dana C. Mulder
- Kathleen A. Wargo

=== 2018 ===
==== Glenn Research Center ====
- Dean A. Szabo, for outstanding service to the air-breathing propulsion community and in mentoring the next generation of test and data engineers at Glenn Research Center (GRC).
- Benjamin P. Saldua, for exceptional service by improving structural design of the Deep Space Network antennas, enabling operation at higher frequencies and efficiencies and NASA mission success at Jet Propulsion Laboratory (JPL).

=== 2017 ===
- David Spergel, Professor of Astrophysical Sciences at Princeton University, for his service as chair of the Space Studies Board and a member of the NASA Advisory Council.

==== Glenn Research Center ====
- Paul R. Butterfield
- Carlos M. Grodsinsky
- Stephen J. Guzik
- Lesha P. Zvosec

==== Goddard Space Flight Center ====
- Kevin Novo-Gradac

=== 2016 ===
==== Glenn Research Center ====
- Victor A. Canacci, for exceptional management of repair, maintenance, and upgrade projects in the test facilities at the NASA Glenn Research Center.
- James J. Kubera, for exceptional service to the design and deployment of innovative financial management processes resulting in efficiencies on multiple NASA contracts.

==== Jet Propulsion Laboratory ====
- Daniel Tran, For exceptional service in technology development and deployment, advancing NASA's autonomy capabilities for space missions and the Deep Space Network.

=== 2015 ===
==== Glenn Research Center ====
- Eric C. Clemons, an employee of Vantage Partner LLC, for exceptional public service in managing the Glenn Engineering and Scientific Support (GESS) contract, plus leading strategic business development and partnership for the benefit of NASA, the agency and Ohio.
- Martha L. Clough, an employee of Leidos, for demonstrating outstanding service as the Leidos Program Manager for Safety, Health, Environmental and Mission Assurance Contract at Glenn.
- Jeffrey C. Smith, an employee of HX5 Sierra, for exceptional management of technician resources, the apprenticeship program and lifting device program in the test facilities at the NASA Glenn Research Center.

=== 2014 ===
==== Ames Research Center ====
- Gordon H. Hardy
- David W. Bogdanoff
- William E. Endter
- Kevin P. Jordan
- Laura H. Pryor

==== Armstrong Flight Research Center ====
- Judy Grizzard
- Tom Speer

==== Glenn Research Center ====
- Richard L. Gilmore (SGT, Inc.), For exceptional leadership in transforming the agency's approach evaluating the impact of projects and tools focused on students that are underrepresented and underserved.
- Paul J. Lizanich (Sierra Lobo, Inc.), For exceptional leadership in the safe electrical and electronic operation of the Propulsion Systems Laboratory and as the vice chair of the Testing Division's Electrical Engineering team.
- Ruth E. Scina (Summit Technologies Solutions), For outstanding service in support of the Space Communication and Navigation Program, including configuration management, outreach and integration.
- William V. Meyer (Universities Space Research Association), For exceptional technical leadership in the field of soft-condensed matter physics.

==== Goddard Space Flight Center ====
- Guy S. Beutelschies
- Carl Blaurock
- Robert O. Cherney
- David Curtis
- Joseph T. Jimmerson
- Paul J. Lizanich
- Mildred G. Martin
- Marcia J. Rieke

==== Headquarter ====
- Robert M. Hanisee
- Wesley T. Huntress, Jr.
- Charles F. Kennel
- Richard C. Kohrs
- Paul B. Koster
- Lars Perkins
- Larry Smarr
- Patti Grace Smith
- Albert George Sturm

==== Jet Propulsion Laboratory ====
- Marda Barthuli
- Luciano Iess
- Howard L. McCallon

==== Johnson Space Center ====
- Kathryn Bolt
- Gary Carter
- Steven D. Foote
- Robert R. Graber
- James D. Milhoan
- Mohammad J. Saiidi

==== Kennedy Space Center ====
- James S. Ingratta
- Paul J. Lizanich

==== Langley Research Center ====
- Linda A. Hunt

==== Marshall Space Flight Center ====
- John N. Fowler
- Robert E. Fudickar
- Barbara A. Maples
- Jeffrey N. Oliver
- Kent D. Schock
- Marshall Space Flight Center
- Eloise Walton-Jackson
- Mike Ward

==== Stennis Space Center ====
- William L. Turner

=== 2013 ===
==== Ames Research Center ====
- Robert T. Hood

==== Dryden Flight Research Center ====
- Michael Venti

==== Glenn Research Center ====
- Robert S. Arrighi, an employee of Wyle Information Systems, LLC., for exceptional achievement in documenting, preserving and promoting the rich history of NASA, its mission and its valuable historical cultural resources.
- E. Allen Arrington, an employee of Sierra Lobo, Inc., for exceptional technical contributions to the nation's wind tunnel testing community.
- Peter W. Phillips, an employee of The Aerospace Corporation, for work he performed for NASA Goddard Space Flight Center on the Suomi National Polar Partnership mission.

==== Goddard Space Flight Center ====
- Charles Calhoon
- Christopher T. Connor
- Frederick S. Patt
- Charles Robinson

==== Jet Propulsion Laboratory ====
- W. Richard Cook

==== Johnson Space Center ====
- Gary W. Cooper
- Kseniya V. Prilutskaya
- Theresa B. Puckett
- Joan A. Robertson
- Ashot E. Sargsyan
- Maxim Syssoyev

==== Kennedy Space Center ====
- Robert N. Abernathy
- Ladonna J. Neterer

==== Langley Research Center ====
- Richard W. Powell
- Jeremy D. Shidner

==== Marshall Space Flight Center ====
- Juan S. Blanch
- Ashley D. Hill
- George H. Ritter
- Flint L. Wild

==== Stennis Space Center ====
- Luke M. Scianna

=== 2012 ===
==== Ames Research Center ====
- John E. Humbert
- Lorien F. Wheeler

==== Glenn Research Center ====
- Christopher J. Blake, an employee of Booz Allen & Hamilton Inc., for exceptional public service to NASA's cost estimating and analyses community on multiple projects and initiatives.
- Gayle T. DiBiasio, an employee of Wyle Information Systems LLC, for sustained exceptional leadership and success in educating the public of NASA's Mission and significantly improving NASA's image through the use of cutting-edge multimedia.
- Christine R. Gorecki, an employee of National Center for Space Exploration Research, for truly outstanding organizational contributions to NASA Exploration Technology Development and International Space Station research at the NASA Glenn Research Center.
- Richard D. Rinehart, an employee of DB Consulting Group Inc., for outstanding efforts in advancing the center's high-end computing and visualization capabilities, fostering multicenter collaborations, and promoting the agency and center.
- Edward L. Winstead, an employee of Science Systems and Applications Inc., for exceptional service in support of Langley's airborne atmospheric research field missions.

==== Stennis Space Center ====
- Lori (Dyle) Hatten, of Gulfport, Miss., lead, transformation and continuous improvement, of CSC (formerly Computer Sciences Corporation), for her exceptional leadership and outstanding contributions as the NASA Enterprise Service Desk project manager for CSC.
- Sharif Kharuf, of Gulfport, Miss., financial support specialist, for Arctic Slope Regional Corporation (ASRC), for his unwavering commitment to innovation and customer service in the financial management division of NSSC.

=== 2011 ===
- Kevin M. Lambert, an employee of QinetiQ North America, Inc., for outstanding contributions to radio frequency antenna metrology and electromagnetic characterization of materials in support of NASA's aerospace communications needs.
- Patricia E. Oleksiak, an employee of Singleton Health Services, LLC, for demonstrating exceptional dedication, commitment and professionalism in providing occupational health services resulting in improved worker safety and health.
- Euy-Sik (Eugene) E. Shin, an employee of the Ohio Aerospace Institute, for significant contributions and dedication to the development and application of polymeric materials in aeronautics, science and exploration applications.
- Eileen M. Collins

==== Ames Research Center ====
- Natalie M. Batalha, for outstanding leadership of the Kepler Science Team
- Alan M. Cassell
- Rhett Flater
- Kurtis Long
- Cathy B. Parks
- Robert B. Pittman

=== 2010 ===
==== Ames Research Center ====
- William G. Bousman
- Christopher Youngquist

==== Glenn Research Center ====
- William V. Boynton, an employee of the University of Arizona Planetary Science Department, for extraordinary performance leading the Phoenix Thermal and Evolved - Gas Analyzer (TEGA) science investigation of volatile materials on Mars.
- William A. Maul III, an employee of QinetiQ North America, Inc., for sustained superior contributions leading to the development of advanced space launch vehicle and propulsion systems health management technologies for NASA programs.
- Sandra H. Valenti, an employee of SAIC, for exceptional public service in improving the safety, health and environmental processes in LTID and Glenn Research Center.

=== 2009 ===
- Michael Okuda, a graphic designer known for his work on Star Trek, for design work including projects like STS-125, Constellation program and Ares I-X.

==== Ames Research Center ====
- Vincent G. Ambrosia
- Daniel M. Empey
- Frank Harris
- Margaret M. Stackpoole

==== Glenn Research Center ====
- Carol A. Galica, an employee of SGT Inc., for educating and inspiring students, teachers and the public about STEM and communicating the overall importance of the impacts of STEM on the nation's future workforce.
- Ann O. Heyward, an employee of Ohio Aerospace Institute, for exceptional community leadership that has resulted in greater awareness of NASA's contributions and has inspired the next generation of explorers.
- Byron D. Tapley, a Professor at the University of Texas at Austin, for exemplary leadership, dedication and commitment to NASA as a member of the NASA Advisory Council

=== 2008 ===
==== Ames Research Center ====
- Gregory Condon
- Shelleen Lomas
- Kristina Skokova

==== Glenn Research Center ====
- Iwan D. Alexander, for exceptional contributions to microgravity research and space exploration in multiple roles.
- Matt A. Murray, for exemplary contributions in support of communicating NASA's mission and goals.

=== 2007 ===
==== Ames Research Center ====
- Dinesh K. Prabhu

=== 2006 ===
- Mark E. Ogles, President of Freedom Information Systems, Inc., for extraordinary efforts as a member of the Exploration Systems Architecture Study.

==== Ames Research Center ====
- Bob Bishop
- Paul Otellini
- Leigh Ann Tanner
- Galina J. Tverskaya

=== 2001 ===
- Christian L. Hardcastle, an employee of The Boeing Co.

=== 1997 ===
- Paul A Masson, Managing Director of Paul Masson Consulting, for formation, governance and business operations of the Advanced General Aviation Transport Experiment (AGATE) Alliance and the AGATE Alliance Association, Inc.

=== 1990 ===
- Edward J. Scully, Director of Engineering for McDonnell Douglas, in recognition of outstanding leadership and dedication to excellence which has resulted in the establishment of a highly motivated and professional design and development team at Kennedy Space Center.

=== 1988 ===
- Carver G. Kennedy, an employee of Morton Thiokol Corporation, Vice President of Space Services.

=== 1986 ===
- James R. Brandenburg, an employee of NASA, for the integration and management of the MCC operations team.

=== 1981 ===
- Alfred M. Carey, an employee Rockwell International, Director of Configuration Management Space Transportation Division.

=== 1985 ===
- John Denver (American country and folk singer, songwriter, and actor)

==== Jet Propulsion Laboratory ====
- Ivan Dale Wells of Hesperia, for exceptional engineering contributions to the successful repair of the bearing and pedestal of the Deep Space Network's 64-meter Goldstone antenna.

=== 1983 ===
- Robert F. Hieter, Vice President of Production Operations at Martin Marietta Manned Space Systems, overseeing the assembly of the Space Shuttle external fuel tanks.

=== 1982 ===
- Karl Kachigan, Director of SLV-3D ATlas, Atlas/Centaur and Titan/Centaur Launch Vehicle Systems General Dynamics, For Exceptional Contributions to the NASA expendable launch vehicle programs through planning, Management, design, mission adaption and development
