= NASA Early Career Achievement Medal =

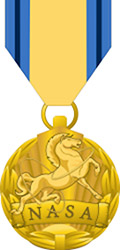
- NASA Early Career Achievement Medal
- Type: Medal
- Country: United states
- Presented by: the National Aeronautics and Space Administration
- Eligibility: Government employees only
- Status: Active
- Established: 2012
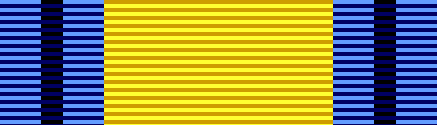
- NASA Early Career Achievement Ribbon

Precedence
- Next (higher): Exceptional Public Achievement Medal
- Next (lower): Equal Employment Opportunity Medal

The NASA Early Career Achievement Medal (ECAM) is awarded to any Government employee for unusual and significant performance during the first 10 years of an individual's early career (i.e., entry-level professional in a scientific, engineering, administrative professional or technical position) in support of the Agency.

Performance is characterized by unusual initiative or a creative achievement that clearly demonstrates a significant contribution in the individual's discipline area that directly contributes to NASA's mission and goals. The contribution is significant, in that, for an employee who is at such an early phase of career, the contribution has substantially improved the discipline area.

These criteria also include the following:

- The achievement yields high-quality results and/or substantial improvements to the discipline.
- Impact of the employee's achievement has significant importance relative to the discipline area.
- The achievement is perceived as outstanding or significant by peers and/or impacted target groups.

== Selected recipients by year ==
There are usually more than 5 recipients of this medal annually.

- Matthew Derenski, Jet Propulsion Laboratory, 2012.
- William Cooper Gilbert, Jet Propulsion Laboratory, 2020.
- Eliad Peretz, Goddard Space Flight Center, 2021.
- Lynnae Quick, Goddard Space Flight Center, 2022.
- Giuliano Liuzzi, Goddard Space Flight Center, 2022.
- Brian R. Bestoso, Langley Research Center, 2023.
- Amir Ibrahim, Goddard Space Flight Center, 2024.
- Zachary S. Courtright, Marshall Space Flight Center, 2024
- Christopher E. Porter, Glenn Research Center, 2025
- Ritoban Basu Thakur, Jet Propulsion Laboratory, 2025.
- Robin A. Onsay, Johnson Space Center, 2025.
- Walter Alvarado, Ames Research Center, 2025.
