= Commencement at the University of Notre Dame =

The University of Notre Dame's annual commencement exercises are held each May, currently in the Notre Dame Stadium. The exercises award undergraduate and graduate degrees.

== Traditions ==
During commencement, the Laetare Medal is awarded.

Notre Dame is known for inviting US presidents to deliver the commencement address, especially in the year of their inauguration. Seven U.S. presidents have delivered the address, including John F. Kennedy, Dwight D. Eisenhower, Jimmy Carter, Ronald Reagan, George H. W. Bush, George W. Bush, and Barack Obama. Most recently, Vice President Mike Pence spoke instead of President Donald Trump, as the president was visiting Saudi Arabia. Other than the United States service academies, Notre Dame has had the most Presidents of the United States delivering the address at commencement. Joe Biden, who had previously spoken at commencement in 2016, as the awardee of the Laetare Medal, was invited in 2021, but could not attend due to scheduling issues.

== List of Commencement speakers ==
- 1861: John McMullen, priest and teacher from Chicago
- 1865: William Tecumseh Sherman, Union General during the Civil War
- 1867: T.E. Corcoran, editor of The Catholic Telegraph
- 1870: Paul Broder, professor from Beloit College, Wisconsin
- 1871: Augustus C. Dodge, U.S. Senator from Iowa
- 1872: Joseph Dwenger, Bishop of Fort Wayne, Indiana
- 1873: John J. Fitzgibbon, editor of The Western Catholic
- 1874: S. S. Hayes, Comptroller from City of Chicago
- 1875: J. S. Morris, from Vicksburg, Mississippi
- 1876: William J. Onahan, Chicago Catholic activist and businessman
- 1877: Frank H. Hurd, U.S. Congressman from Ohio
- 1878: John Lancaster Spalding, Bishop of Peoria, Illinois
- 1879: No commencement exercises due to the great fire
- 1880: Edmund Francis Dunne, Chief Justice of Arizona
- 1881: W. W. Cleary, from Covington, Kentucky
- 1882: Silas Chatard, Bishop of Vincennes, Indiana
- 1883: John Ambrose Watterson, Bishop of Columbus, Ohio
- 1884: Ignacio Montes de Oca y Obregón, Bishop of Linares, Mexico
- 1885: The scheduled speaker Major General William S. Rosecrans canceled his commitment due to duties in Washington, D.C.
- 1886: John Lancaster Spalding, Bishop of Peoria, [Illinois
- 1887: Richard Gilmour, Bishop of Cleveland
- 1888: P. F. Carr, from Denver, Colorado
- 1889: William P. Breen, Alumnus from Fort Wayne, Indiana
- 1890: John Lancaster Spalding, Bishop of Peoria, Illinois
- 1891: John Lancaster Spalding, Bishop of Peoria, Illinois
- 1892: John Samuel Foley, Bishop of Detroit, Michigan
- 1893: Robert Seton, priest from the Diocese of Newark, N.J.
- 1894: John Ambrose Watterson, Bishop of Columbus, Ohio
- 1895: John Lancaster Spalding, Bishop of Peoria, Illinois
- 1896: Thomas A. Moran, judge from Chicago
- 1897: Joseph F. Mooney, priest from the Archdiocese of New York
- 1898: Maurice Francis Burke, Bishop of St. Joseph, Missouri
- 1899: John Lancaster Spalding, Bishop of Peoria, Illinois
- 1900: John J. Glennon, Bishop of Kansas City, Missouri
- 1901: John Shanley, Bishop of Fargo, North Dakota
- 1902: William P. Breen A.B. ’77, A.M. ’80 from Fort Wayne, Indiana
- 1903: John M. Gearin, attorney from Portland, Oregon
- 1904: Charles Joseph Bonaparte, attorney, progressive reformer, member of the Board of Indian Commissioners
- 1905: Marcus A. Kavanagh, judge from Chicago
- 1906: D. J. Stafford, priest and lecturer from Washington, D.C.
- 1907: John Talbot Smith, priest, author, lecturer from New York City
- 1908: Charles P. Neill, U.S. Commissioner of Labor
- 1909: Hannis Taylor, United States Ambassador to Spain, authority on international law
- 1910: Thomas R. Marshall, Governor of Indiana
- 1911: Charles Fitzpatrick, Chief Justice of Canada
- 1912: Thomas Francis Hickey, Bishop of Rochester, New York
- 1913: James M. Cox, Governor of Ohio
- 1914: Joseph E. Ransdell, U.S. Senator from Louisiana
- 1915: John F. Fitzgerald, Mayor of Boston and U.S. Representative
- 1916: Martin J. Wade, Member of the U.S. House of Representatives from Iowa and Judge of the United States District Court for the Southern District of Iowa
- 1917: Joseph Chartrand, Coadjutor, Bishop of Indianapolis
- 1918: Edward N. Hurley, Chairman of the United States Shipping Board
- 1919: Francis Bickerstaffe-Drew, English war chaplain and novelist
- 1920: Morgan J. O'Brien, Judge of the New York Supreme Court
- 1921: David I. Walsh, U.S. Senator from Massachusetts
- 1922: Kickham Scanlan, Chief Justice of the Criminal Court, Chicago
- 1923: Thomas Lindsey Blayney, diplomat, veteran of the world war, educator from Rice University, Huston
- 1924: Woodbridge N. Ferris, U.S. Senator from Michigan
- 1925: Edmond H. Moore, Democratic National Committee member and attorney from Youngstown, Ohio
- 1926: Dudley G. Wooten, former U.S. Representative from Texas and Professor of Law at the Notre Dame Law School
- 1927: Alfred J. Talley, judge on the circuit court of appeals of New York City
- 1928: Francis O'Shaughnessy, attorney, Chicago
- 1929: Colonel William J. Donovan, former United States Assistant Attorney General and war hero from Buffalo, New York
- 1930: Claude G. Bowers, author, editor, orator
- 1931: Angus Daniel McDonald, Treasurer of the United States Railroad Commission
- 1932: Owen D. Young, New York City financier
- 1933: Paul V. McNutt, Governor of Indiana
- 1934: Frank C. Walker, Chairman of the National Emergency Council
- 1935: Shane Leslie, essayist, dramatist, lecturer
- 1936: William James Mayo, cofounder of Mayo Clinic
- 1937: Dennis F. Kelly, president of The Fair Store, a Chicago department store
- 1938: Terence Byrne Cosgrove, attorney from San Francisco
- 1939: William Henry Harrison, Vice-President and Chief Engineer of AT&T
- 1940: D. Worth Clark, U.S. Senator from Idaho
- 1941: Joseph P. Kennedy Sr., United States Ambassador to the United Kingdom
- 1942: J. Edgar Hoover, Director of the FBI
- 1942-Winter: William F. Jeffers
- 1943: Arthur J. Hope, author and editor
- 1943-Winter: Harry Kelly, former Governor of Michigan
- 1944: Thomas J. Brennan, Notre Dame professor of philosophy
- 1945: Phillip S. Moore, dean of the Notre Dame Graduate School
- 1946: George Sokolsky, columnist
- 1947: General George Kenney, Chief of the Strategic Air Command
- 1948: Paul G. Hoffman, Director of Economic Cooperation Administration, Washington, D.C.
- 1949: John Stephen Burke, President of B. Altman and Company, New York City
- 1950-Winter: John F. Kennedy, U.S. Congressman (and later President of the United States of America)
- 1950: John Hearne, ambassador of Ireland to the U.S.
- 1951: Francis P. Matthews, Secretary of the Navy
- 1952: Charles Malik, Minister of Lebanon to the U.S.
- 1953: Detlev Bronk, president of the Johns Hopkins University
- 1954: James Rhyne Killian, president of the Massachusetts Institute of Technology
- 1955: Herbert Brownell Jr., Attorney General of the United States
- 1956: Admiral Arleigh Burke, Chief of Naval Operations, U.S. Navy
- 1957: Earl Warren, Chief Justice of the United States Supreme Court
- 1958: James P. Mitchell, Secretary of Labor
- 1959: John A. McCone, Chairman of the Atomic Energy Commission
- 1960: Dwight D. Eisenhower, 34th President of the United States
- 1961: Sargent Shriver, Director of the Peace Corps
- 1962: Henry Cabot Lodge, US Ambassador to the United Nations
- 1963: Lester B. Pearson, Prime Minister of Canada
- 1964: Thomas C. Mann, Assistant Secretary of State for Inter-American Affairs
- 1965: McGeorge Bundy, Special Assistant to the President for National Security Affairs
- 1966: Barbara Ward, Baroness Jackson of Lodsworth, economist, London, England
- 1967: Eugene McCarthy, U.S. Senator from Minnesota
- 1968: James Alfred Perkins, president of Cornell University
- 1969: Daniel Patrick Moynihan, Assistant to the President for Urban Affairs
- 1970: James E. Allen Jr., U.S. Commissioner of Education
- 1971: Kenneth Keniston, Yale Medical School
- 1972: Kingman Brewster Jr., president of Yale University
- 1973: Malcolm Moos, president of the University of Minnesota
- 1974: Rosemary Park, professor of education, UCLA
- 1975: Alan J. Pifer, president of the Carnegie Corporation of New York and the Carnegie Foundation for the Advancement of Teaching
- 1976: Vernon Jordan, Executive Director of the National Urban League
- 1977: Jimmy Carter, 39th President of the United States
- 1978: William F. Buckley Jr., editor of The National Review
- 1979: Joseph A. Califano Jr., Secretary of Health, Education, and Welfare
- 1980: Benjamin Civiletti, Attorney General of the United States
- 1981: Ronald Reagan, 40th President of the United States
  Ronald Reagan, then the President of the United States, addressed the graduating class of 1981
- 1982: Pierre Trudeau, Prime Minister of Canada
- 1983: Cardinal Joseph Bernardin, Archbishop of Chicago
- 1984: Loret Miller Ruppe, Director of the Peace Corps
- 1985: José Napoleón Duarte, President of El Salvador
- 1986: Bishop James William Malone, Bishop of Youngstown and president of the United States Catholic Conference
- 1987: Derek Bok, president of Harvard University
- 1988: Andrew Young, Mayor of Atlanta, Georgia
- 1989: Peter Ueberroth, Commissioner of Major League Baseball
- 1990: Bill Cosby, actor and producer
- 1991: Margaret O'Brien Steinfels, editor of Commonweal
- 1992: George H. W. Bush, 41st President of the United States
- 1993: Tom Brokaw, NBC news anchor
- 1994: Albert Reynolds, Taoiseach (Prime Minister) of Ireland
- 1995: Condoleezza Rice, Provost of Stanford University (later U.S. Secretary of State)
- 1996: Mary Ann Glendon, Learned Hand professor of law, Harvard University
- 1997: Mark Shields, political Commentator and columnist
- 1998: Joe Kernan, Indiana Lieutenant Governor
- 1999: Elizabeth Dole, president of the American Red Cross
- 2000: Kofi Annan, Secretary-General of the United Nations (1997–2006)
- 2001: George W. Bush, 43rd President of the United States (2001–2009)
- 2002: Tim Russert, host of NBC's Meet the Press
- 2003: Richard Lugar, U.S. Senator from Indiana (1977–2013)
- 2004: Alan Page, Associate Justice of the Minnesota Supreme Court and former Notre Dame and National Football League football player
- 2005: Vartan Gregorian, President of the Carnegie Corporation of New York
- 2006: Mary McAleese, President of Ireland (1997–2011)
- 2007: Jeff Immelt, CEO of General Electric
- 2008: Cardinal Theodore McCarrick, Archbishop Emeritus of Washington, D.C.
- 2009: Barack Obama, 44th President of the United States (2009–2017)
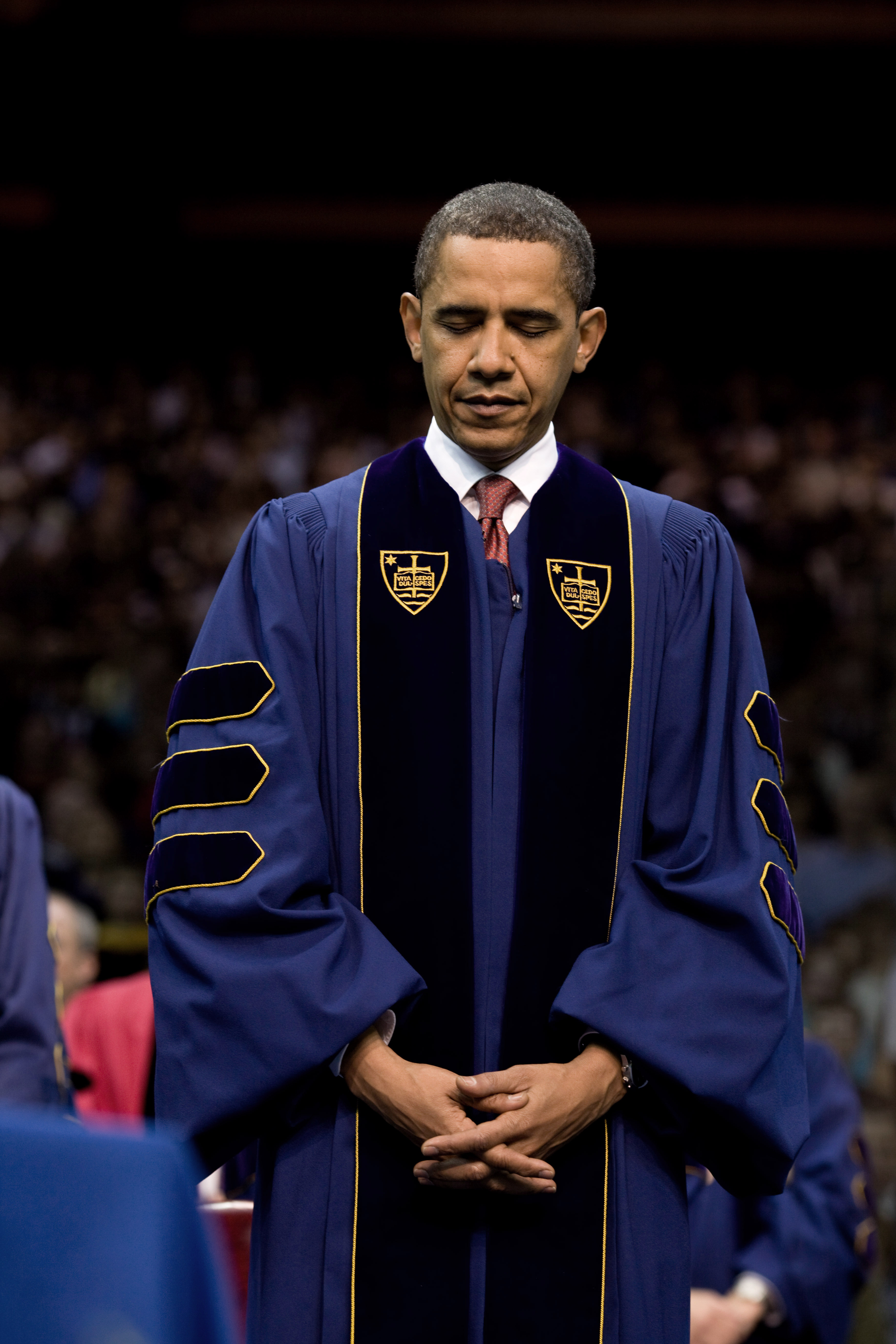
  Barack Obama at the commencement ceremony on May 17, 2009.
- 2010: Brian Williams, anchor of NBC Nightly News
- 2011: Robert Gates, United States Secretary of Defense (2006–2011)
- 2012: Haley Scott DeMaria, alumna and motivational speaker injured in a tragic 1992 bus accident involving the Notre Dame swimming team
- 2013: Cardinal Timothy M. Dolan, Archbishop of New York and President of the United States Conference of Catholic Bishops
- 2014: Ray Hammond II, Founder of Bethel African Methodist Episcopal Church
- 2015: Chris Patten, Chancellor of the University of Oxford (2003–present)
- 2016: General Martin Dempsey, former Chairman of the Joint Chiefs of Staff (2011–2015)
- 2017: Mike Pence, 48th Vice President of the United States (2017–2021) and former Governor of Indiana (2013–2017)
- 2018: Sergio Moro, Brazilian judge, a leader in his country's anti-corruption movement
- 2019: Peggy Noonan, Pulitzer Prize-winning columnist for the Wall Street Journal, speechwriter for President Ronald Reagan
- 2020: Bartholomew I of Constantinople, Orthodox Archbishop of Constantinople-New Rome and Ecumenical Patriarch of Constantinople (cancelled due to the COVID-19 pandemic. The 2020 Commencement Celebration was held in 2022 and the speaker was John Crowley, CEO of the Biotechnology Innovation Organization).
- 2021: Jimmy Dunne, Vice Chairman and Senior Managing Principal of Piper Sandler Companies.
- 2022: Borys Gudziak, Metropolitan Archbishop of the Ukrainian Catholic Archeparchy of Philadelphia and President of Ukrainian Catholic University
- 2023: Juan Manuel Santos, former President of Colombia (2010–2018) and recipient of the 2016 Nobel Peace Prize
- 2024: John I. Jenkins, 17th President of the University of Notre Dame (2005–2024)
- 2025: Christopher W. Grady, Vice Chairman of the Joint Chiefs of Staff (2021–2025)
- 2026: Raffaella Petrini, President of the Pontifical Commission for Vatican City State and President of the Governorate of Vatican City State (2025–present)

== See also ==
- Columbia University commencement
- Commencement at Central Connecticut State University
- History and traditions of Harvard commencements
- List of Fordham University commencement speakers
- Virginia Tech commencement speakers
