= Claire Babineaux-Fontenot =

American businessperson and CEO of Feeding America

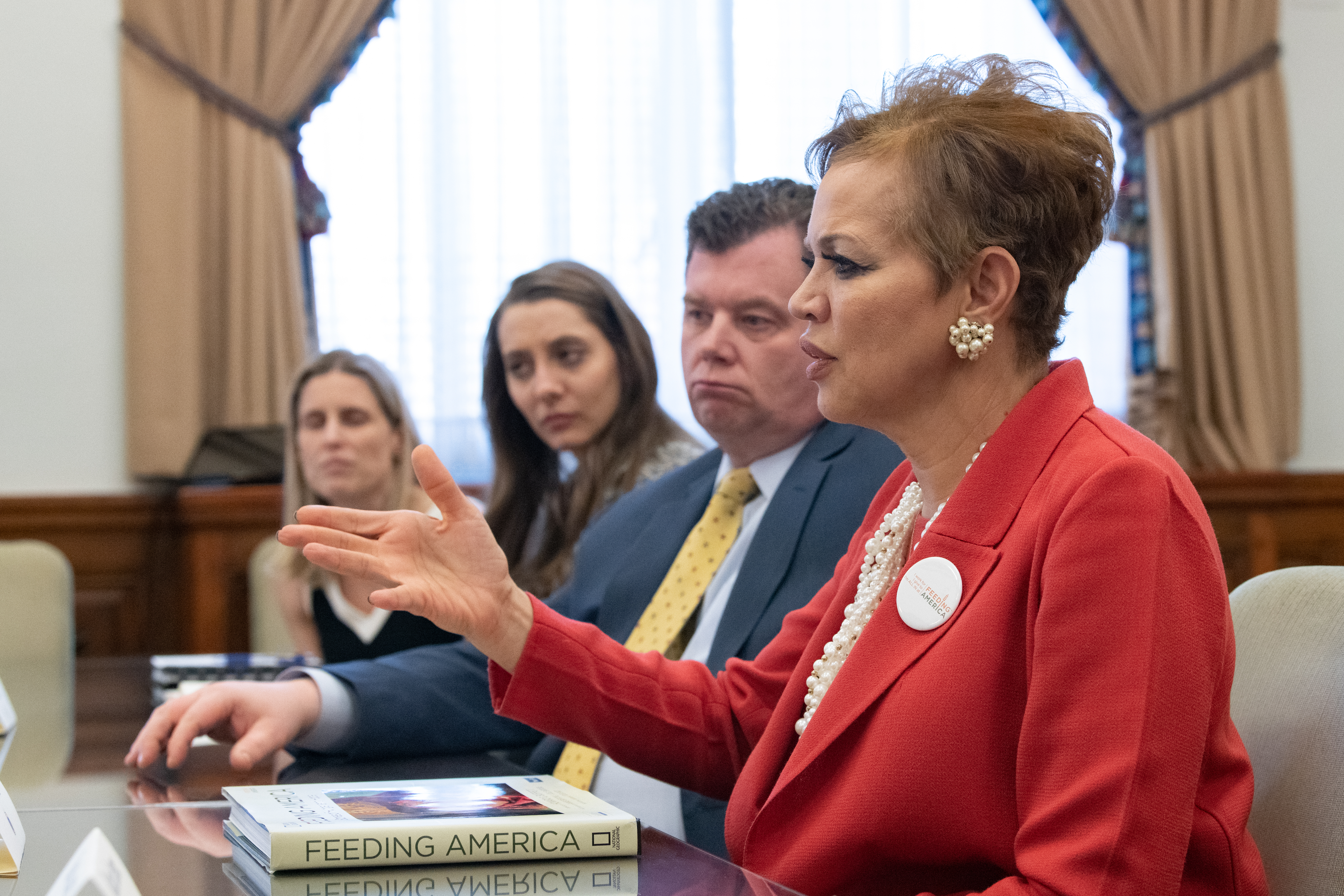
- Born: 1964 (age 60–61); Opelousas, Louisiana
- Education: University of Louisiana at Lafayette; Southern University Law Center; Dedman School of Law
- Known for: CEO of Feeding America
- Spouse: Barry Fontenot

Claire L. Babineaux-Fontenot (born in 1964) is the CEO of Feeding America, a national foodbank across the United States. In 2020, Time named her among the 100 most influential people in the world.

== Early life and education ==
Born in Opelousas, Louisiana, Babineaux-Fontenot attended the University of Southwestern Louisiana, Southern University Law Center, and Southern Methodist University's Dedman School of Law. Growing up, her parents Warren and Mary Alice Babineaux cared for over 100 children through a combination of birth, adoption and fostering. Her parents were eventually inducted into the National Adoption Hall of Fame in 2008.

== Career and recognition ==
After graduating from college, Babineaux-Fontenot spent 13 years in executive roles at Walmart, including executive vice president of finance and treasurer, and held leadership positions at Adams and Reese, LLP, and PwC. She was also the assistant secretary for the state Office of Legal Affairs and administrative law judge for the Louisiana Department of Civil Service. After undergoing treatment for her cancer in 2015, Babineaux-Fontenot left Walmart to "grant her the time to glean some insight on how to best use her voice to make a positive impact on the lives of other men and women with cancer."

In 2018, Babineaux-Fontenot was named CEO of the board of directors for Feeding America. During the COVID-19 pandemic, Time named her among the 100 most influential people in the world. She also joined the New York Life Board of Directors.

On March 10, 2024, the University of Notre Dame announced that Babineaux-Fontenot will receive the University's 2024 Laetare Medal, the oldest and most prestigious honor given to American Catholics, at Notre Dame’s 179th University Commencement Ceremony on May 19, 2024.

She was named one of Time’s Women of the Year for 2025.

== Personal life ==
Babineaux-Fontenot and her husband, Barry Fontenot, have two children together and reside in Springdale, Arkansas. She is Catholic.
