= Norma Pimentel =

Mexican-American nun (born 1953)

Sister Norma Pimentel MJ
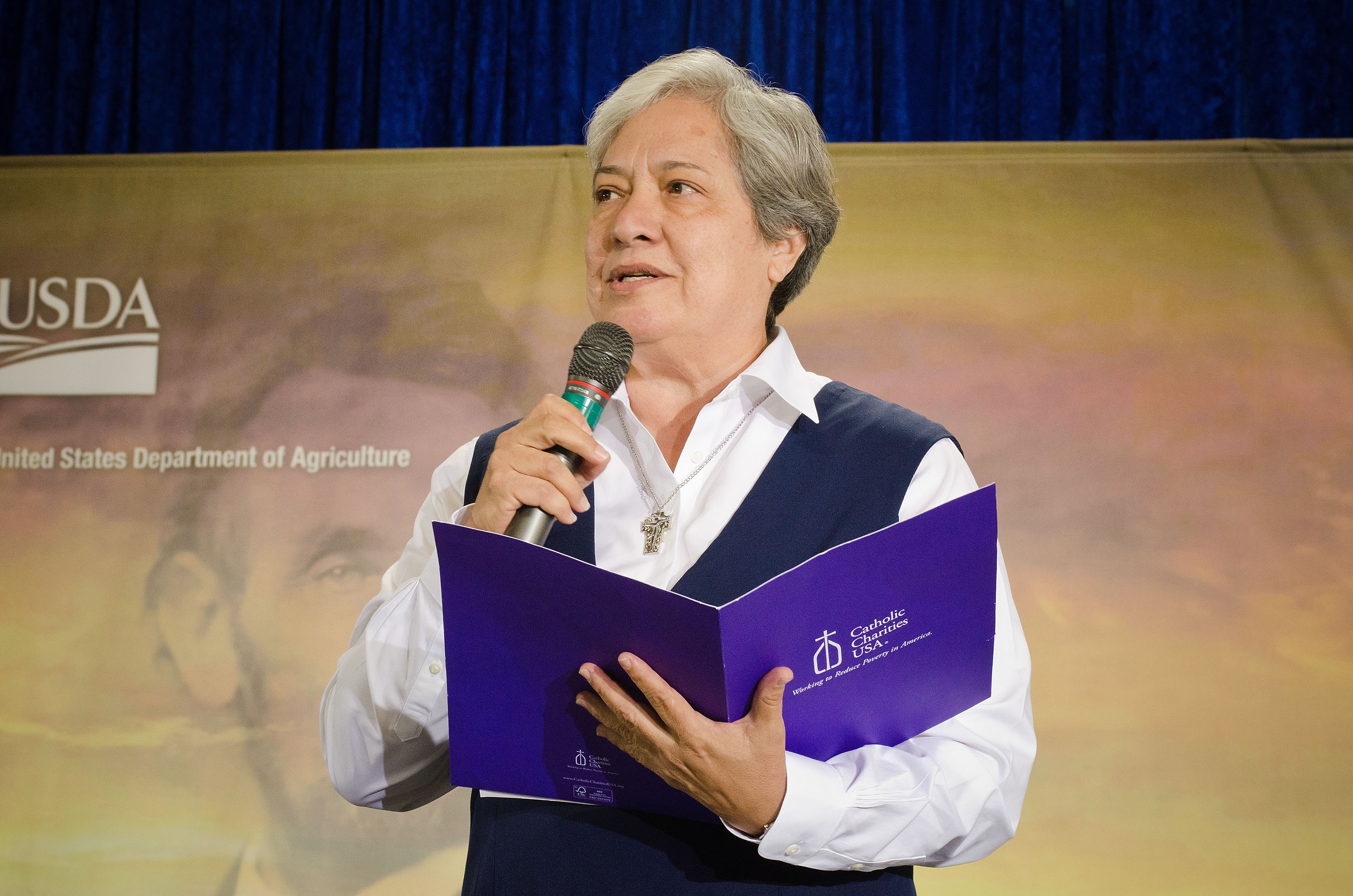
- Pimentel in 2012

Personal life
- Born: 1 July 1953 (age 73) Brownsville, Texas, United States
- Education: Pan American University; St. Mary's University, Texas; Loyola University Chicago

Religious life
- Religion: Catholic Church
- Institute: Missionaries of Jesus
- Profession: 1978

Norma Pimentel, MJ (born July 1, 1953) is a Mexican-American nun of the Missionaries of Jesus and the executive director of Catholic Charities of the Rio Grande Valley. She has been praised by Pope Francis and others for her work with refugees and immigrants to the United States. She has also gained international attention for her work and for speaking out against the Trump administration family separation policy.

In 2020, she was included on Time's list of the 100 most influential people in the world.

== Early life ==
Pimentel was born on July 1, 1953, in Brownsville, Texas, where her parents had applied for residency. Her mother was from Matamoros and her father was from Chiapas, both in Mexico.

She started kindergarten in Matamoros, Mexico, and then moved to Brownsville, Texas. She describes herself as an American citizen by chance, having grown up on both sides of the border. She has four siblings.

She was a poor student in high school but improved her grades enough to be admitted to college. She studied art, earning a bachelor's degree in the subject from the Pan American University. She made money as a young woman designing window displays for clothing stores.

== Religious life ==
Pimentel entered religious life against the wishes of her family. She entered the Missionaries of Jesus in 1978. As part of her formation, she earned a master's degree in theology from St. Mary's University. She later earned a second master's in counseling at Loyola University Chicago.

She began working with refugees in 1980 at the Casa Oscar Romero and there developed a passion for the work. Pimentel became executive director of Catholic Charities of the Rio Grande Valley in 2004, (Note: Crux has the date as 2008.) having previously served as a counselor and assistant director. In this role she provides food, shelter, and other necessities to migrants entering the United States. She has been featured in newspapers around the world, on 20/20, CNN, 60 Minutes, and more.

Pimentel continues to paint, often portraying the refugee families she sees in her shelter. The paintings are often donated to fundraisers, and one was given as a gift to Pope Francis during his 2015 trip to the United States.

Pimentel was selected to receive the Laetare Medal by the University of Notre Dame in recognition of outstanding service to the Catholic Church and society in March 2018. In September 2018, she was honored the Hispanic Heritage Award for Service during the 31st Annual Hispanic Heritage Awards - considered among the highest honors by Latinos for Latinos in the U.S.

In 2020, Time named her one of the 100 most influential people of 2020 because of her three decades of work showing mercy to migrants entering Texas from Mexico to seek refuge in the United States, noting that she is called “the Pope’s favorite nun.”

In 2023, Pimental was one of the first recipients of the Civic Renewal Award, an award given to Christians who demonstrate "exemplary contributions to the health and well-being of their communities and nation". She was recognized for her "tireless efforts in serving and advocating for the marginalized and vulnerable". She is also known for having a strong working relationship with Bishop Daniel E. Flores, who has said of her, “My attitude as a bishop is if you have someone who knows what they’re doing, let them do it”.
