= Lawrence Flick =

American physician (1856-1938)

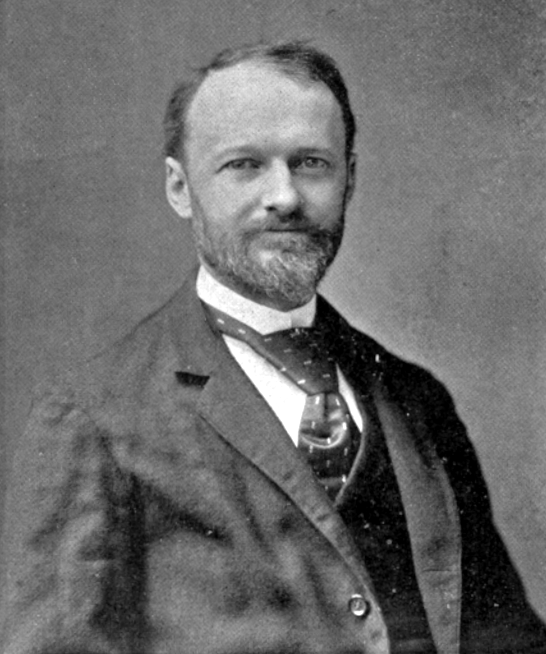
- Born: Lawrence Francis Flick; August 10, 1856; Carrolltown, Pennsylvania
- Died: July 7, 1938 (aged 81); Philadelphia, Pennsylvania
- Burial place: Old Saint Mary's Church
- Education: Saint Vincent College; Jefferson Medical College
- Occupations: Physician, writer
- Spouse: Ella Stone (m. 1885; died 1934)
- Awards: Laetare Medal (1920)

Lawrence Francis Flick (1856–1938) was an American physician who pioneered research and treatment of tuberculosis. He was influential as an author, lecturer, and historian. He is a co-founder of the National Association for the Study and Prevention of Tuberculosis (American Lung Association) and was the first to advocate its formation as early as 1898.

== Biography ==
Flick was born August 10, 1856, on a farm near Carrolltown, Pennsylvania, to John Flick and Elizabeth Sharbaugh. His family had immigrated to Pennsylvania to avoid religious persecution in Strasbourg, France, following Prince Demetrius Augustine Gallitzin to Cambria County so that the family could freely practice their Catholic faith. He attended Saint Vincent College in Latrobe, Pennsylvania, and Jefferson Medical College in Philadelphia. Graduating from medical school in 1879, he started a general practice in medicine. He started his specialization in tuberculosis treatment and research in Philadelphia in 1882. He married Ella Stone in 1885, and they had seven children. A complete biography of Flick, including how his family came to America, how he entered the medical field and what led to the study of tuberculous, is contained in The Beloved Crusader, a book written by his daughter Ella, who was a novelist in her own right.

In September 1890, he incorporated Rush Hospital for Consumption and Allied Diseases. He formed the Pennsylvania Society for the Prevention of Tuberculosis, the first organization of this type in the world, in 1892. He was one of the first people to theorize that TB was an airborne contagious disease, and not hereditary or a social scourge. In 1898, Dr. Flick first discussed the creation of a national association. The National Association for the Study and Prevention of Tuberculosis, which later became the American Lung Association, was formed in 1904. Flick chaired the second annual meeting in 1906 when the society adopted the double-barred Lorraine Cross as its symbol.

In 1901, he founded the White Haven Sanatorium for the treatment of tuberculosis; and served as its director until 1935. In the first year of operation, the sanatorium was visited by industrialist and philanthropist Henry Phipps Jr. In 1903 with a generous donation, Flick opened the Henry Phipps Institute for the Study, Treatment, and Prevention of Tuberculosis in Philadelphia. He served as its Director of the Institute until 1910 when it became part of the University of Pennsylvania.

He was one of the founders of the American Catholic Historical Society and served as its president from 1893 to 1896 and again from 1913 to 1914. He was a co-founder of the American Catholic Historical Association in 1919 and served as its first president in 1920. Flick was the recipient of the Laetare Medal in 1920 from the University of Notre Dame. He considered this one of his greatest honors.

Flick died at his home in Philadelphia on July 7, 1938. He is buried with his family at Old Saint Mary's Church, 5th & Locust Street, Philadelphia, Pennsylvania, in the cemetery in a family plot which sits along the wall of the Church.

== Legacy ==
The Pennsylvania State Lawrence Flick State Hospital operated in Cresson, Pennsylvania from 1956 to 1982.

In 1998 the Lawrence F. Flick Memorial Center opened in Philadelphia. The facility is operated by the City of Philadelphia and the American Lung Association as a publicly funded tuberculosis clinic.

== See also ==
- American Lung Association
- Henry Phipps Jr.
