= Laetare Medal =

- Sponsored by: University of Notre Dame
- Date: Laetare Sunday
- Location: University of Notre Dame
- Country: United States
- First award: 1883
- Website: https://laetare.nd.edu/

The Laetare Medal is an annual award given by the University of Notre Dame in recognition of outstanding service to the Catholic Church and society. The award is given to an American Catholic or group of Catholics "whose genius has ennobled the arts and sciences, illustrated the ideals of the church and enriched the heritage of humanity." First awarded in 1883, it is the oldest and most prestigious award for American Catholics.

== Overview ==
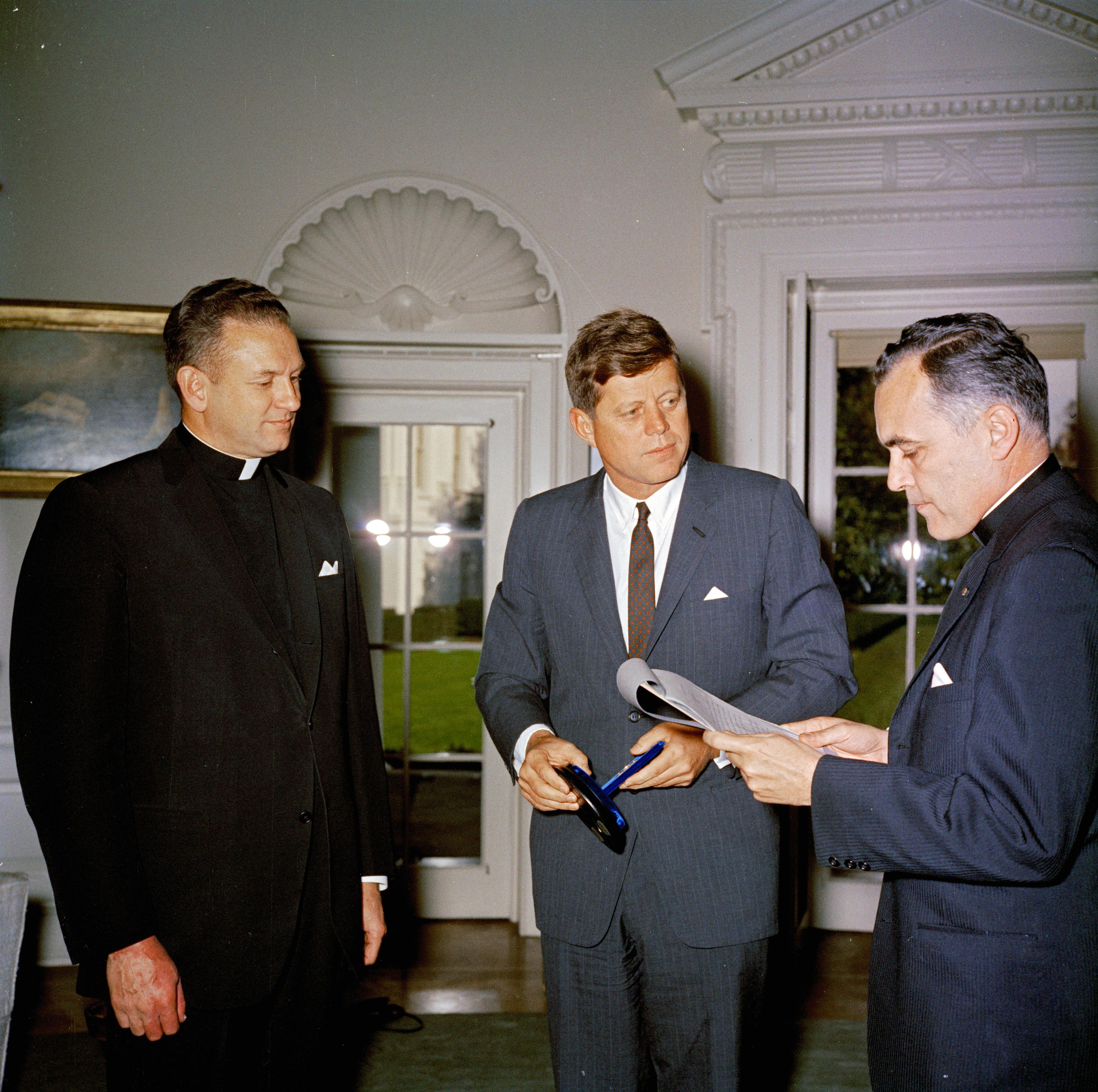
Rev. Hesburgh presents the 1961 Laetare Medal to President John F. Kennedy. Fr Edmund P. Joyce to the side.

The medal is an external award which can be given to a person from outside the University of Notre Dame. It is named the Laetare Medal because the recipient of the award is announced in celebration of Laetare Sunday, the fourth Sunday in Lent. The Laetare Medal was conceived by University of Notre Dame professor James Edwards as an American version of the papal award the Golden Rose. It was approved of by the university's founder Father Edward Sorin, C.S.C. The Golden Rose has existed since the 11th century, and was customarily awarded to a royal person on Laetare Sunday, although this was rarely done during the 20th century. The university adapted this tradition — awarding a gold medal, instead of a rose — to a distinguished American Catholic on Laetare Sunday. The medal has the Latin inscription Magna est veritas et praevalebit, meaning "Truth is mighty, and it shall prevail." The medal is awarded during commencement at Notre Dame, during which the laureate delivers a remark.

A candidate for the award must be a practicing American Catholic who has made a distinctively Catholic contribution in his or her professional or intellectual life. A committee generally takes names of potential recipients from faculty and staff at the University of Notre Dame. They select two or three candidates from this group, which are voted on by the officers of the university.

== History ==
John Gilmary Shea, a historian of the Catholic Church in the United States, was the first person to be awarded the Laetare Medal in 1883. The recipients of the Laetare Medal come from varied fields. Recipients include jazz musicians, Cardinals, philanthropists, ambassadors, authors, opera singers, senators, doctors, generals, and two U.S. presidents. Both Catholic Presidents of the United States, Kennedy and Biden, are recipients of the award.

=== 2009 Medal ===
Harvard Law School professor and former United States Ambassador to the Holy See, Mary Ann Glendon, was chosen as the 2009 recipient but declined the award when the university, as part of its justification for naming Barack Obama as its commencement speaker and grant him an honorary degree, stated:

"President Obama won’t be doing all the talking. Mary Ann Glendon, the former U.S. ambassador to the Vatican, will be speaking as the recipient of the Laetare Medal. ... We think having the president come to Notre Dame, see our graduates, meet our leaders, and hear a talk from Mary Ann Glendon is a good thing for the president and for the causes we care about."

In light of Obama's strong pro-choice policies, Glendon considered Notre Dame's decision to be in violation of a 2004 pronouncement from the United States Conference of Catholic Bishops instructing Catholic institutions not to provide "honors, awards, or platforms" to "those who act in defiance of [Catholic] fundamental moral principles." She also believed that the university's statements had placed her in an untenable position; as she wrote in her letter declining the medal:

"A commencement, however, is supposed to be a joyous day for the graduates and their families. It is not the right place, nor is a brief acceptance speech the right vehicle, for engagement with the very serious problems raised by Notre Dame’s decision—in disregard of the settled position of the U.S. bishops—to honor a prominent and uncompromising opponent of the Church’s position on issues involving fundamental principles of justice."

Notre Dame ultimately selected 1984 Laetare recipient Judge John T. Noonan, Jr. to speak, choosing not to award the 2009 medal at all.

== List of recipients ==
Year	Laetare Medalist	Position	Year	Laetare Medalist	Position
1883	John Gilmary Shea	Historian	1956	General Alfred M. Gruenther	Soldier
1884	Patrick Charles Keely	Architect	1957	Clare Boothe Luce	Diplomat
1885	Eliza Allen Starr	Art Critic	1958	Frank M. Folsom	Industrialist
1886	General John Newton	Engineer	1959	Robert Daniel Murphy	Diplomat
1887	Edwin Preuss	Publicist	1960	George N. Shuster	Educator
1888	Patrick V. Hickey	Founder and Editor of The Catholic Review	1961	John F. Kennedy	President of the United States
1889	Anna Hanson Dorsey	Novelist	1962	Francis J. Braceland	Psychiatrist
1890	William J. Onahan	Organizer of the American Catholic Congress	1963	Admiral George Whelan Anderson, Jr.	Chief of Naval Operations
1891	Daniel Dougherty	Orator	1964	Phyllis McGinley	Poet
1892	Henry F. Brownson	Philosopher and Author	1965	Frederick D. Rossini	Scientist
1893	Patrick Donahoe	Founder of the Boston Pilot	1966	Patrick F. & Patricia Caron Crowley	Founders of The Christian Movement
1894	Augustin Daly	Theatrical Producer	1967	J. Peter Grace	Industrialist
1895	Mary Anne Sadlier	Novelist	1968	Robert Sargent Shriver	Diplomat
1896	General William Starke Rosecrans	Soldier	1969	William J. Brennan Jr.	Associate Justice of the Supreme Court
1897	Thomas Addis Emmet	Physician	1970	Dr. William B. Walsh	Physician
1898	Timothy Edward Howard	Jurist	1971	Walter Kerr & Jean Kerr	Drama Critic and Author
1899	Mary Gwendolin Caldwell	Philanthropist	1972	Dorothy Day	Founder of the Catholic Worker Movement
1900	John A. Creighton	Philanthropist	1973	Rev. John A. O'Brien	Author
1901	William Bourke Cockran	Orator	1974	James A. Farley	Business Executive and Former Postmaster General
1902	John Benjamin Murphy	Surgeon	1975	Sr. Ann Ida Gannon, BVM	President of Mundelein College
1903	Charles Joseph Bonaparte	Lawyer	1976	Paul Horgan	Author
1904	Richard C. Kerens	Diplomat	1977	Mike Mansfield	Former Senate Majority Leader
1905	Thomas B. Fitzpatrick	Philanthropist	1978	Msgr. John Tracy Ellis	Church Historian
1906	Francis J. Quinlan	Physician	1979	Helen Hayes	Actress
1907	Katherine Eleanor Conway	Journalist and Author	1980	Thomas P. (Tip) O'Neill Jr.	Speaker of the House
1908	James C. Monaghan	Economist	1981	Edmund Sixtus Muskie	Secretary of State
1909	Frances Tieran (Christian Reid)	Novelist	1982	John Francis Cardinal Dearden	Archbishop Emeritus of Detroit
1910	Maurice Francis Egan	Author and Diplomat	1983	Edmund & Evelyn Stephan	Chairman Emeritus of the board of trustees and his wife
1911	Agnes Repplier	Author	1984	John T. Noonan, Jr.	Lawyer
1912	Thomas M. Mulry	Philanthropist	1985	Guido Calabresi	Dean of the Yale Law School
1913	Charles George Herbermann	Editor of the Catholic Encyclopedia	1986	Thomas & Mary Elizabeth Carney	Chairman of the board of trustees and his wife
1914	Edward Douglass White	Chief Justice of the United States	1987	Rev. Theodore Hesburgh, CSC	President of the University of Notre Dame
1915	Mary Virginia Merrick	Philanthropist	1988	Eunice Kennedy Shriver	Founder & Chairwoman of the Special Olympics
1916	James Joseph Walsh	Physician and Author	1989	Walker Percy	Novelist
1917	Admiral William Shepherd Benson	Chief of Naval Operations	1990	Sister Thea Bowman (posthumously)	Educator
1918	Joseph Scott	Lawyer	1991	Corinne Lindy Boggs	Former Louisiana Congresswoman
1919	George L. Duval	Philanthropist	1992	Daniel Patrick Moynihan	U.S. Senator from New York
1920	Lawrence Francis Flick	Physician	1993	Donald R. Keough	Chairman Emeritus of the Board of Trustees
1921	Elizabeth Nourse	Artist	1994	Sidney Callahan	Educator and Journalist
1922	Charles Patrick Neill	Economist	1995	Joseph Cardinal Bernardin	Archbishop of Chicago
1923	Walter George Smith	Lawyer	1996	Sister Helen Prejean	Death Penalty Abolitionist
1924	Charles Donagh Maginnis	Architect	1997	Rev. Virgilio Elizondo	Theologian and Activist
1925	Albert Francis Zahm	Scientist	1998	Dr. Edmund D. Pellegrino	Medical Ethicist and Educator
1926	Edward Nash Hurley	Businessman	1999	Philip Gleason	Professor Emeritus of History, Notre Dame
1927	Margaret Anglin	Actress	2000	Andrew McKenna	Chairman of the Board of Trustees
1928	John Johnson Spalding	Lawyer	2001	Msgr. George G. Higgins	Priest and Labor Activist
1929	Alfred Emmanuel Smith	Statesman	2002	Father John Smyth	Executive Director of Maryville Academy
1930	Frederick Philip Kenkel	Publicist	2003	Peter and Margaret O'Brien Steinfels	Editors of Commonweal
1931	James J. Phelan	Businessman	2004	Father J. Bryan Hehir	President of Catholic Charities, Archdiocese of Boston
1932	Stephen J. Maher	Physician	2005	Dr. Joseph E. Murray	Surgeon & Nobel Prize Winner
1933	John McCormack	Artist	2006	Dave Brubeck	Jazz Pianist
1934	Genevieve Garvan Brady	Philanthropist	2007	Patrick McCartan	Chairman of the Board of Trustees
1935	Francis Hamilton Spearman	Novelist	2008	Martin Sheen	Actor
1936	Richard Reid	Journalist and Lawyer	2009	NOT AWARDED (SEE ABOVE)	
1937	Jeremiah D. M. Ford	Scholar	2010	Dana Gioia	Poet and Chairman of National Endowment for the Arts
1938	Irvin William Abell	Surgeon	2011	Sister Mary Scullion, R.S.M., & Joan McConnon	Social Advocates
1939	Josephine Van Dyke Brownson	Catechist	2012	Ken Hackett	Former President of Catholic Relief Services
1940	General Hugh Aloysius Drum	Soldier	2013	Sister Susanne Gallagher, S.P. Sister Mary Therese Harrington, S.H. Rev. James H. McCarthy	Founders of S.P.R.E.D. (Special Religious Education Development Network)
1941	William Thomas Walsh	Journalist and Author	2014	Kenneth R. Miller	Professor of Biology at Brown University
1942	Helen Constance White	Author and Teacher	2015	Aaron Neville	R&B Singer
1943	Thomas Francis Woodlock	Editor	2016	Joseph Biden; John Boehner	Vice President of the United States (and later President of the United States) former Speaker of the House of Representatives
1944	Anne O'Hare McCormick	Journalist	2017	Father Greg Boyle, S.J.	Founder of Homeboy Industries
1945	Gardiner Howland Shaw	Diplomat	2018	Sister Norma Pimentel, M.J.	Executive Director, Catholic Charities of the Rio Grande Valley
1946	Carlton J. H. Hayes	Historian and Diplomat	2019	Dr. Norman Francis	President Emeritus, Xavier University of Louisiana and civil rights leader
1947	William G. Bruce	Publisher and Civic Leader	2020	Kathleen McChesney	Former FBI executive assistant director and director of USCCB Office of Child Protection
1948	Frank C. Walker	Postmaster General and Civic Leader	2021	Carla Harris	Finance executive, gospel artist, and motivational speaker
1949	Irene Dunne Griffin	Actress	2022	Sharon Lavigne	Environmental justice activist and founder of RISE St. James
1950	General Joseph L. Collins	Soldier	2023	Sister Rosemary Connelly, R.S.M.	former executive director of Misericordia Home
1951	John Henry Phelan	Philanthropist	2024	Claire Babineaux-Fontenot	CEO of Feeding America
1952	Thomas E. Murray	Member of the U.S. Atomic Energy Commission	2025	Kerry Alys Robinson	President of Catholic Charities, USA
1953	I.A. O'Shaughnessy	Philanthropist	2026	Timothy Shriver	Chairman of the Special Olympics
1954	Jefferson Caffery	Diplomat	2027		
1955	George Meany	Labor Leader	2028		

== See also ==
- List of ecclesiastical decorations
