= William Thomas Walsh =

American Catholic historian and author (1891–1949)

- Born: September 11, 1891; Waterbury, Connecticut, U.S.
- Died: January 22, 1949 (aged 57); White Plains, New York, U.S.
- Education: Yale University (B.A., 1913)
- Occupations: Historian, author, educator
- Spouse: Helen Gerard Sherwood (m. 1914)
- Children: 6

William Thomas Walsh (September 11, 1891 – January 22, 1949) was an American Catholic historian, author, educator, and violinist. He is best known for popular biographies of Spanish Catholic historical figures and for his 1947 book Our Lady of Fatima, which significantly increased awareness of the Fatima apparitions among American Catholics. He received the Laetare Medal from the University of Notre Dame in 1941. Walsh wrote from a strongly Catholic perspective; his interpretations of Spanish history, particularly regarding the Inquisition and the expulsion of the Jews, have been both praised in Catholic circles and criticized by some historians for alleged antisemitic bias.

== Early life and education ==
Walsh was born on September 11, 1891, in Waterbury, Connecticut, to descendants of Irish immigrants. He earned a B.A. from Yale University in 1913, where he also studied violin and was active in musical life on campus. In 1914 he married Helen Gerard Sherwood, with whom he had six children.

Walsh began his career as a journalist, reporting for newspapers in Waterbury and Hartford, Connecticut, and for the Philadelphia Public Ledger, including a period covering the Mexican Border for the New York Daily during World War I. In 1918 he moved into education, teaching English at Hartford Public High School. From 1919 to 1933 he headed the English Department at the Roxbury School in Massachusetts, and he then joined the faculty of Manhattanville College of the Sacred Heart, where he served as Professor of English for fourteen years. Throughout his teaching career Walsh spent summers conducting archival research in Catholic churches and archives in Spain. In 1929, he attended the MacDowell Colony in New Hampshire, where he worked on completing Isabella of Spain. In 1933, Fordham University awarded him an honorary Doctorate of Literature.

== Career as a historian ==
Walsh's historical writing focused on figures and institutions of late medieval and early modern Spanish Catholicism. He drew on research in Spanish archives and presented his biographies as correctives, in his own framing, to what he characterized as Protestant-influenced historical narratives, a tradition of criticism associated with the concept of the Black Legend. His work attracted both recognition within Catholic intellectual circles and criticism from scholars who argued that his religious commitments shaped his interpretations.

=== Isabella of Spain (1930) ===
Walsh's biography of Isabella I of Spain, subtitled The Last Crusader and published by Robert M. McBride & Company in New York, was selected for the Catholic Book Club and translated into Spanish, French, and German.

==== Reception ====
Historian and critic Cecil Roth, while describing the book as "well written" and "on the whole abreast of the most recent researches," nonetheless accused Walsh in the October 1932 issue of the Dublin Review of resurrecting the blood libel. According to Roth, Walsh uncritically accepted the Spanish Inquisition's version of the La Guardia case, characterizing the approach as reading Spanish history "with the eyes of the wildest anti-Semite." Walsh's reply disputed the accusation, rejecting the term "anti-Semite" as inaccurate and stating that his initial sympathy toward Jews had "shrank considerably" during his archival research. He defended his examination of the La Guardia case as historically necessary, arguing that the historian was not obliged to make "wholesale vindication of all Jews accused of murder." He also wrote that Jewish miseries were "not the result, fundamentally, of the hatred and misunderstanding of others, but the consequence of their own stubborn rejection of Our Lord and Saviour Jesus Christ who predicted in unmistakable language exactly what has befallen them."

=== Philip II (1937) ===
Walsh's biography of Philip II of Spain, published by Sheed and Ward in London and New York, drew on archival research to present Philip as a defender of Catholicism against Protestant and Ottoman challenges.

=== Characters of the Inquisition (1940) ===
In this work, Walsh examined key figures of the Holy Office of the Inquisition, arguing that prevailing historical accounts leaned "with naive credulity" upon the work of Juan Antonio Llorente, whom he described as a discredited official who had burned documents that did not serve his purpose. The book has remained in print through traditionalist Catholic publishers including TAN Books. Walsh also expressed theological views on the Jewish people in the book, writing that there is "a quality in the Jews which does not exist in any other race" and linking their historical suffering to a spiritual rejection of Christianity.

=== Saint Teresa of Avila (1943) ===
Walsh's biography of Teresa of Ávila was published in 1943.

=== Saint Peter the Apostle (1948) ===
Walsh's final completed biography examined the life of Saint Peter.

== Our Lady of Fatima (1947) ==
Walsh's most widely read work is Our Lady of Fatima, published by Doubleday in May 1947 and subsequently reissued in multiple editions including an Image Books paperback edition. The book draws on Walsh's personal research in Portugal, including a direct interview with the surviving Fatima visionary.

=== Research and the interview with Sister Lucia ===
Walsh traveled to Portugal to conduct primary research, interviewing witnesses and Church officials connected to the 1917 apparitions. On July 15, 1946, he interviewed Sister Lucia, then known as Sister Maria das Dores, at the convent of the Dorothean Sisters at Vilar, Portugal. The interview was published as an epilogue to the first edition. Walsh also drew on Lucia's written memoirs, composed at the direction of her bishop.

During the interview, Lucia corrected the wording of the prayer Our Lady had requested after each decade of the Rosary, which had circulated in inaccurate published versions. She gave the correct form as: "O my Jesus, pardon us, and save us from the fire of hell; draw all souls to heaven, especially those most in need."

=== The consecration of Russia ===
One of the most extensively cited portions of the book concerns the Fatima request for the Consecration of Russia. Walsh recorded Lucia stating that Our Lady had requested not a general consecration of the world but specifically the consecration of Russia to her Immaculate Heart. Lucia also indicated that the specific requirement for the consecration to be performed by the Pope together with all the world's bishops on a single designated day was communicated in 1927, ten years after the original 1917 apparitions.

=== Reception ===
Prior to publication of Our Lady of Fatima, awareness of the Fatima apparitions in the United States had been largely confined to Catholic periodicals and pamphlets. According to the introduction written by William C. McGrath for a subsequent edition, the book was more than any other single factor instrumental in bringing the Fatima apparitions to the attention of a broad American audience.

A contemporary review in Kirkus Reviews (May 1, 1947) noted that the book would appeal differently to general and Catholic readers. For a general audience, the reviewer found the narrative told "in oddly unemotional terms" and "wholly subjective, couched in phraseology that is unfamiliar to non-Catholics," lacking the broad spiritual appeal of comparable works such as The Song of Bernadette. A Catholic reader quoted in the same review, while affirming the soundness of the book's doctrine, similarly criticized its "pedestrian prose, saccharine comments and cliches" and its failure to arouse spiritual feeling.

== Awards and recognition ==
Walsh received the Laetare Medal from the University of Notre Dame in 1941. In 1943, he received the Cross of Commander of the Order of Alfonso X from the Spanish Minister of Education.

== Death ==
Walsh retired from teaching in 1947 due to deteriorating health and died in White Plains, New York, in January 1949. His wife, Helen Gerard Sherwood Walsh, died in January 1967 at the age of seventy-five. His papers are held in the Special Collections of the University Libraries at the Catholic University of America in Washington, D.C.

== Selected bibliography ==
- The Mirage of the Many (1910)
- Isabella of Spain: The Last Crusader (New York: Robert M. McBride & Company, 1930)
- Out of the Whirlwind (novel, 1935)
- Philip II (London and New York: Sheed and Ward, 1937)
- Shekels (blank-verse play, 1937)
- Lyric Poems (1939)
- Characters of the Inquisition (New York: P.J. Kenedy & Sons, 1940)
- Babies, not Bullets! (booklet, 1940)
- Thirty Pieces of Silver (a play in verse)
- Saint Teresa of Avila (1943)
- La actual situación de España (booklet, 1944)
- El casa crucial de España (booklet, 1946)
- Our Lady of Fatima (New York: Doubleday, 1947) ISBN 978-0-385-02869-1
- The Carmelites of Compiègne (a play in verse)
- Saint Peter the Apostle (1948)
