= Notre Dame Stadium =

Stadium in South Bend, Indiana

- "The House That Rockne Built"
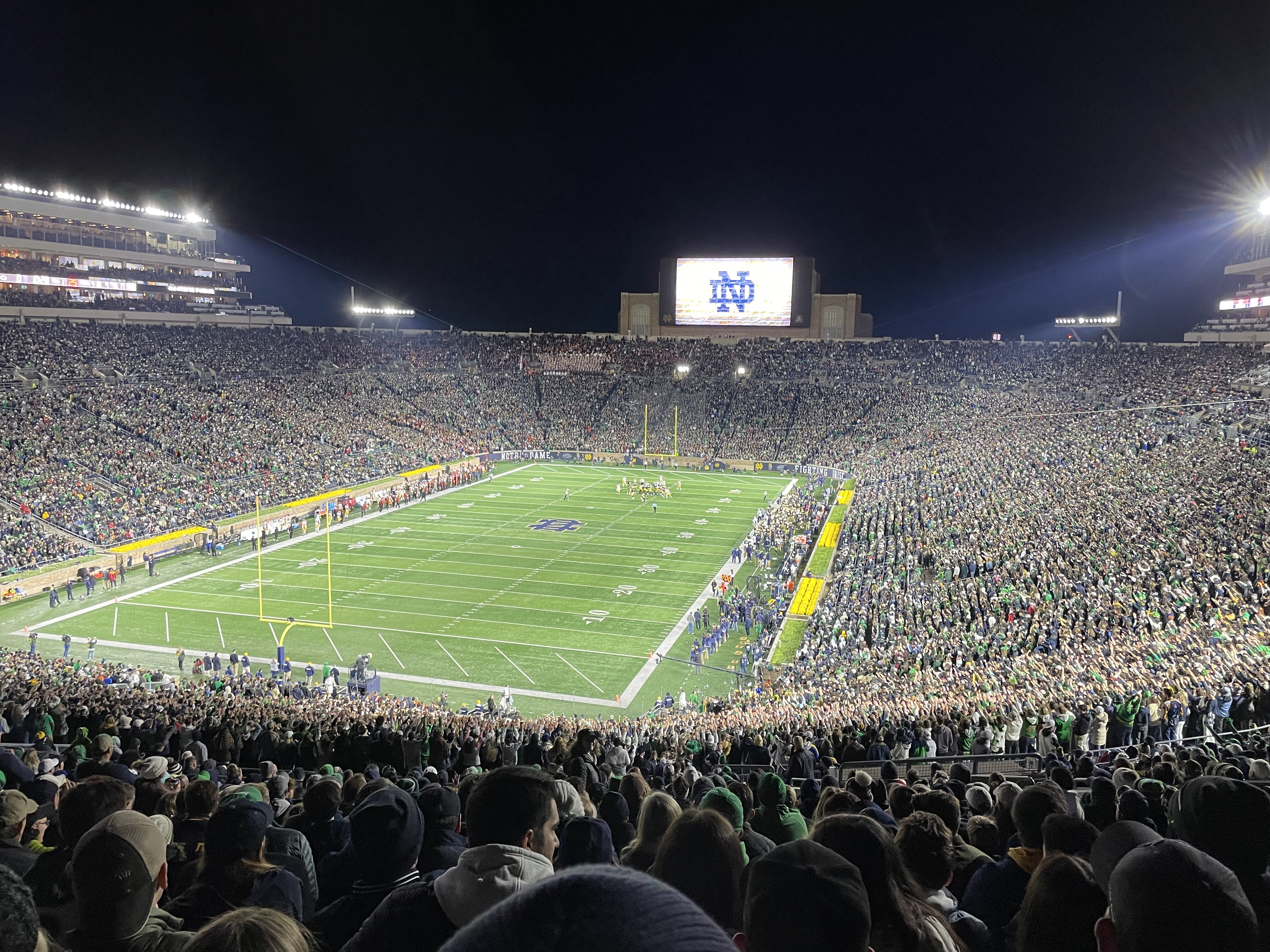
- Notre Dame Stadium night game in October 2021

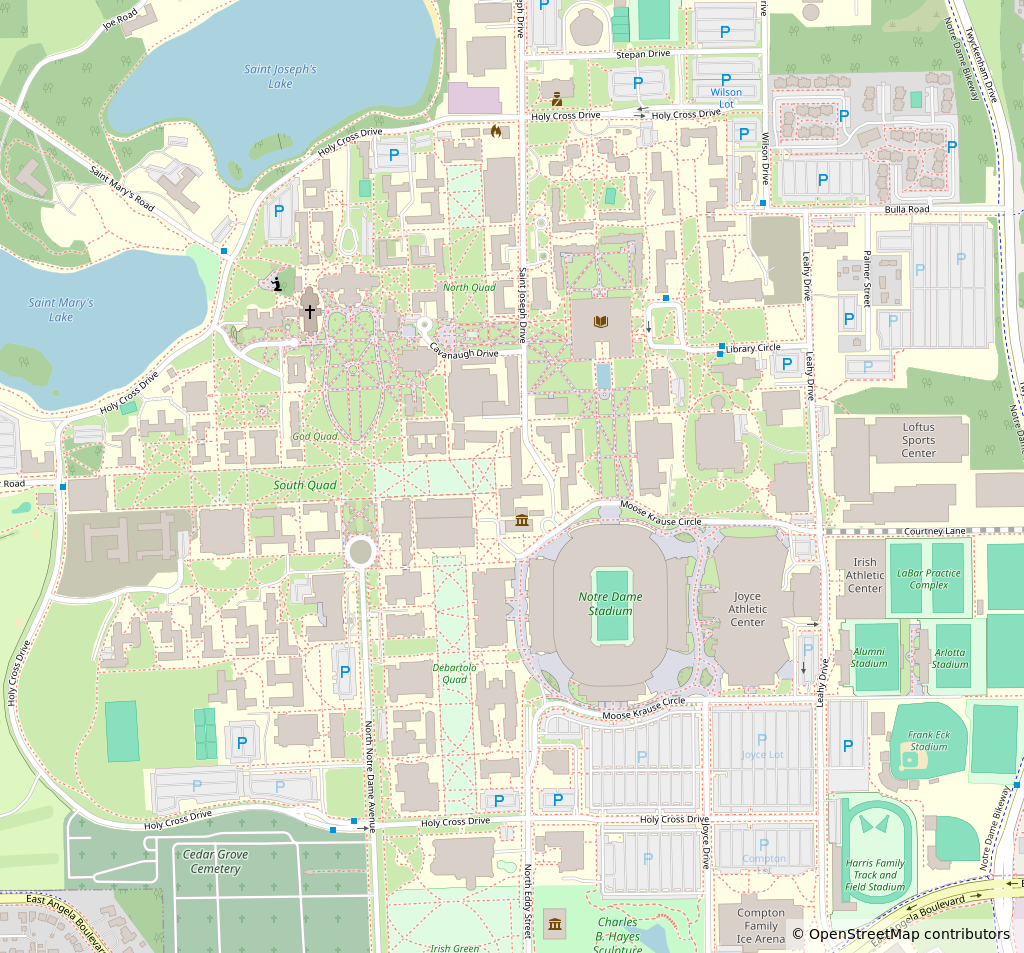
- Location on the Notre Dame campus
- Address: 2010 Moose Krause Circle; South Bend, Indiana; U.S.
- Coordinates: 41°41′54″N 86°14′02″W
- Elevation: 732 ft (223 m)
- Owner: University of Notre Dame
- Operator: University of Notre Dame
- Capacity: 77,622 (2017–present) Former List: 54,000 (1930–1965); 59,075 (1966–1996); 80,225 (1997); 80,012 (1998–1999); 80,232 (2000); 80,795 (2001–2016)
- Type: Stadium
- Surface: Artificial turf (2014–present); Natural grass (1930–2013)
- Current use: Football

Construction
- Groundbreaking: 1929; 97 years ago
- Opened: October 4, 1930; 96 years ago
- Renovated: 1994-1997, 2014-2017
- Cost: $750,000
- Architect: Osborn Engineering
- General contractor: Sollitt Construction Company

Tenants
- Notre Dame Fighting Irish (NCAA) (1930–present)

Website
- tour.nd.edu/notre-dame-stadium

Notre Dame Stadium is an outdoor football stadium in South Bend, Indiana, the home field of the University of Notre Dame Fighting Irish football team.

It was built in 1930 under the guidance of Knute Rockne, regarded as one of the greatest coaches in college football history, which gave rise to the stadium's nickname, "The House that Rockne Built." Prior to the stadium's construction, the Fighting Irish played in Cartier Field. The stadium seating capacity was nearly 60,000 for decades, until a major renovation between 1994 and 1997 added an upper bowl and more than 20,000 additional seats, which increased the capacity to over 80,000. In 2014, the Campus Crossroads renovation decreased the seats to 77,622. The stadium has been regularly sold out for home games since 1964.

It is one of the oldest, most recognizable venues in college football. It is also famous for its view of the Touchdown Jesus mural. The playing surface was changed to artificial turf in 2014, after 84 seasons on natural grass. The playing field has a conventional north–south alignment at an approximate elevation of 732 feet (223 m) above sea level.

In 2014, the $400 million Campus Crossroads expansion renovated the structure and added three buildings onto the stadium: the Duncan Student Center, which hosts student recreational and dining facilities; O'Neill Hall, which houses the university's music department; and Corbett Family Hall, which hosts the psychology and anthropology departments. In addition, the three buildings house premium stadium seating, press boxes, and event spaces.

The stadium also hosts the university's commencement and has been a venue for concerts, the 2019 NHL Winter Classic, and hockey, soccer, and rugby matches.

== History ==
=== Construction ===
The stadium was built in 1930 to replace the outdated Cartier Field. The construction of the stadium project was brought to a head by the actions of Rockne. The 1928 season had not been a stellar one at 5–4, but the net profits for that football season approached $500,000. Rockne was frustrated with the slow and cautious Holy Cross priests and their decision-making process about spending money on the new stadium. He could not believe that a decision could not be made when there was such a large amount of money in the bank. Because of this and a number of other issues, Rockne submitted his resignation to Father Charles O’Donnell, the president of the university. O’Donnell knew of Rockne's history of submitting his resignations, and he also suspected that nothing would fully satisfy Rockne.

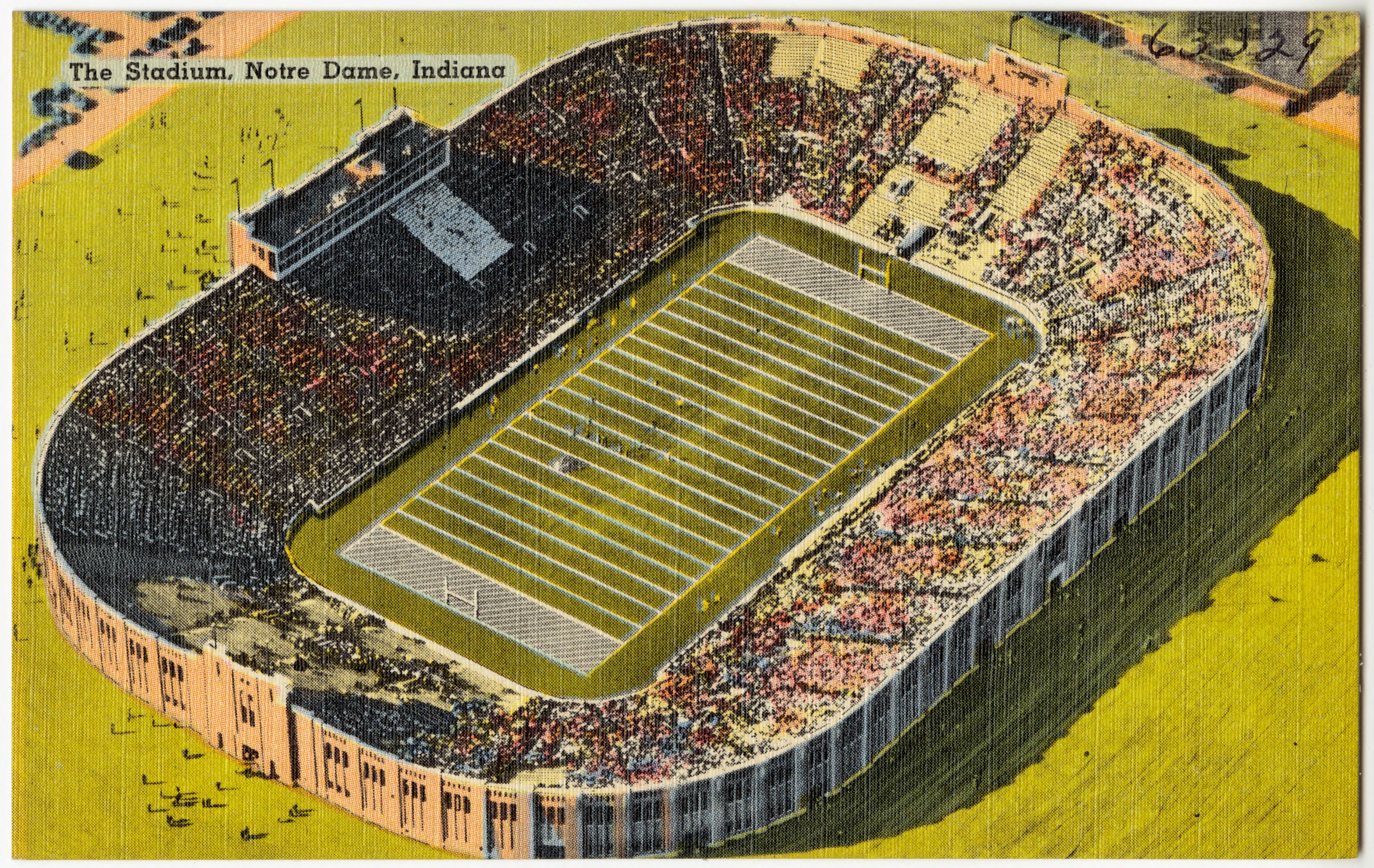
Postcard of Notre Dame stadium between circa 1930 and 1945.

O’Donnell was willing to find a compromise but was also unwilling to put the university in debt to finance the stadium. He knew that the excess receipts from the 1928 season and the projected receipts from playing all the away games in 1929 on neutral fields would bring adequate cash into the university to finance the construction of the stadium. O’Donnell also devised the scheme to finance 240 six-person “reserved box seats." This precursor of the personal seat license would allow the buyer to purchase tickets at face value and guarantee the same prime location for ten years for an investment of $3,000 between the 45-yard lines, $2,500 between the 45 and 35-yard lines, and $2,000 between the 35 and the 25-yard lines. The university raised over $150,000 on this idea alone.

The total cost of construction exceeded $750,000, and the original seating capacity was 54,000. Head coach Knute Rockne played a key role in its design, keeping the space between the playing field and the stands to a minimum. It is patterned, on a smaller scale but in better fashion, after Michigan Stadium, the main difference being the tunnel location. In 1929, plans were started by Osborn Engineering of Cleveland, selected for their experience in designing Yankee Stadium and Fenway Park. Sollitt Construction Company of South Bend was the general contractor, and earth preparation began in the fall of 1929. Due to an unusually cold fall and winter, above-ground construction did not begin until April 2, 1930, with the stadium effectively being built in just six months. Over two million bricks were used in the construction of the walls, and the concrete was placed in a monolithic continuous placement by section. There were over 300 workers on the site at most times, and they worked five 10-hour days and one six-hour day on Saturdays. The average worker was paid $1 a day plus lunch, with the more skilled workers earning up to $5 a day.

The original stadium seated 59,075, measured a half-mile (800 m) in circumference, stood 45 feet (14 m) high, and featured a glass-enclosed press box rising 60 feet (18 m) above ground level. Initial stands reached 55 rows.

The Irish played their first game in the new stadium in 1930 on October 4 and defeated SMU 20–14. The first Notre Dame touchdown in the stadium was scored by "Jumping Joe" Savoldi on a 98-yard kickoff return. The official dedication was a week later, on October 11 against Navy, and Savoldi scored three touchdowns and was cited as "the first hero in the lore of Notre Dame Stadium." G.K. Chesterton was present as a spectator for the game and wrote the poem The Arena to commemorate the occasion. Frank E. Hering, captain of the 1898 team, coach from 1896 to 1898, and president of the Alumni Association, delivered the major speech during the dedication. The stadium witnessed its first game at capacity in 1931, with 50,731 spectators for the USC game.

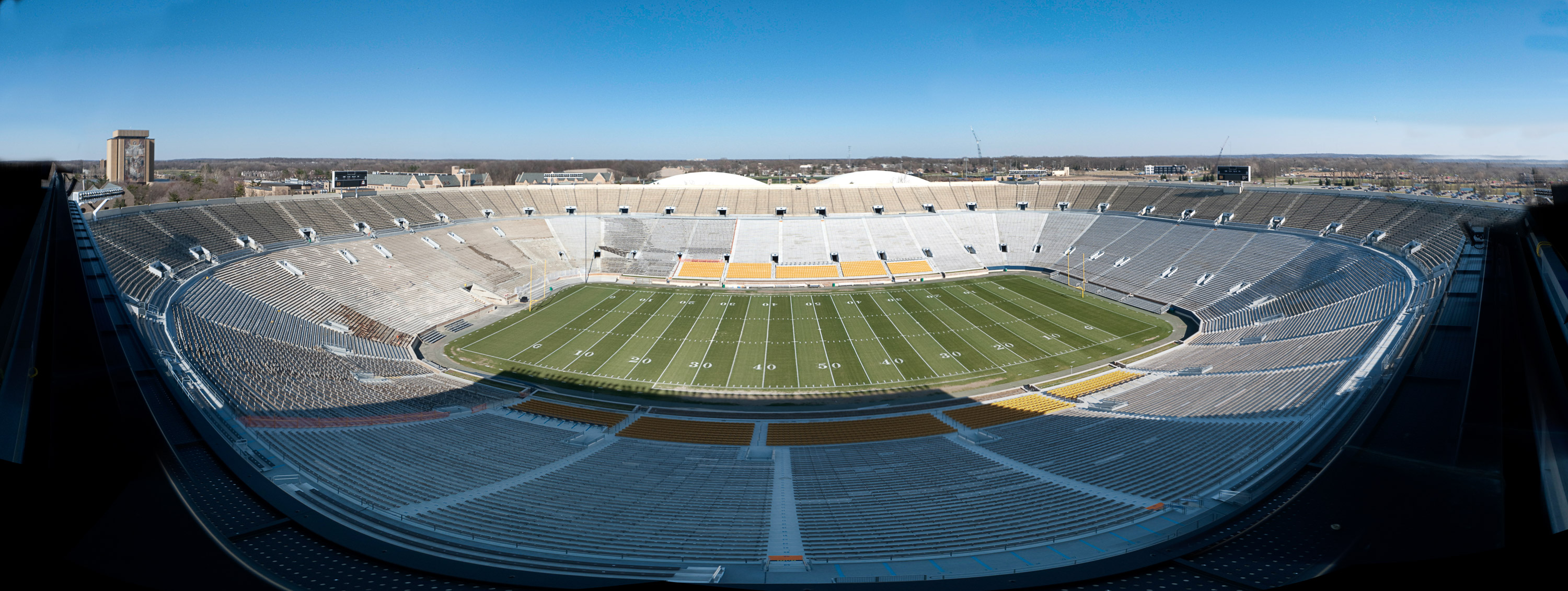
Notre Dame Stadium circa 2009.

=== Modern era ===
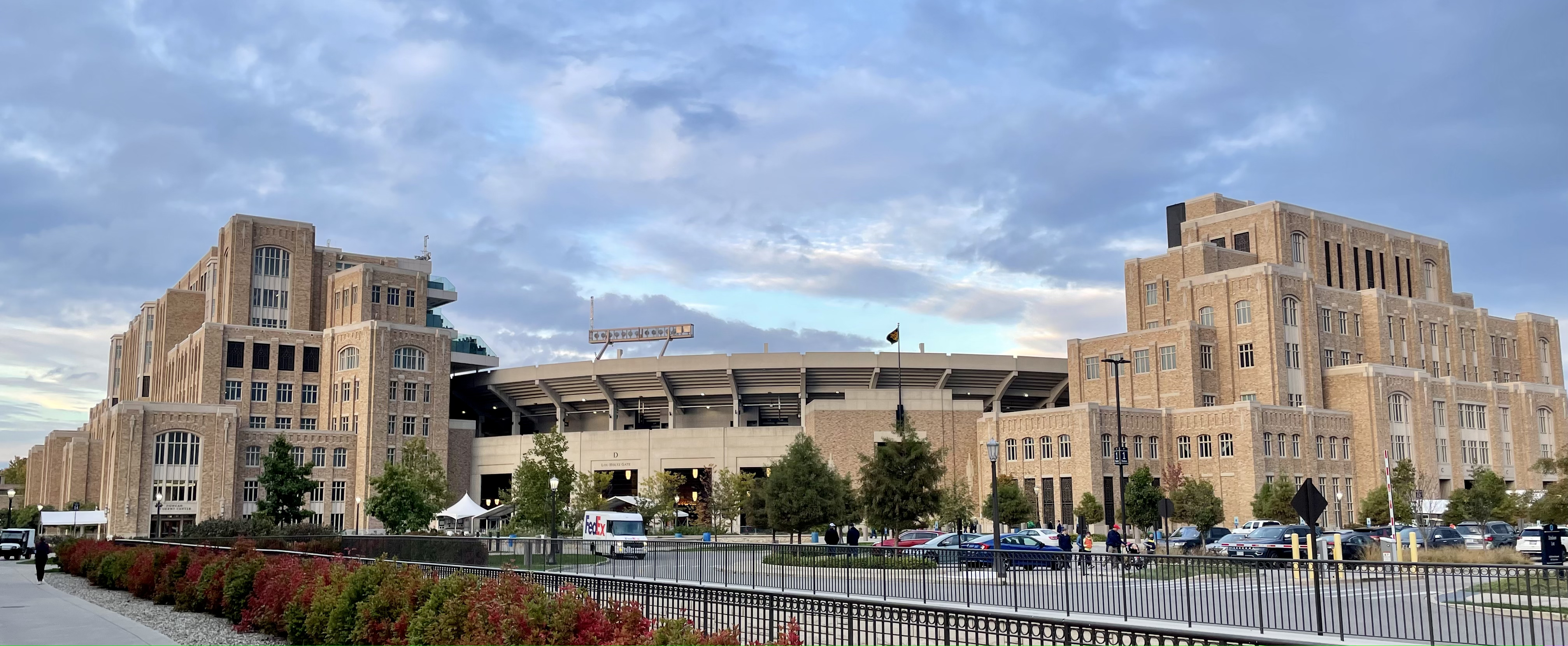
Duncan Student Center and O'Neill Hall as part of the Campus Crossroads addition to the stadium.

The first televised game in the stadium occurred on November 8, 1952, and the Irish beat Oklahoma 27–21. The attendance record of the stadium pre-renovation was 60,128 spectators and was set for the ND vs. Oklahoma game on Oct. 27, 1956, with Oklahoma winning, 40–0. In 1979, the 50th anniversary of the stadium was celebrated during the Navy game, with commemorative tickets that were reproductions of the original 1930 dedication game. The stadium was featured in the movie Rudy in 1993. The 1991 game against Tennessee was the 100th straight sold-out game and the 300th game played in the stadium.

The stadium was renovated and expanded between November 1994 and the summer of 1997, during which home games were still played in the stadium. The $53 million expansion project featured increasing the seating to 80,795 and installing permanent lighting. The renovation featured the construction of an upper bowl (which contributed to more than 20,000 additional seats), an expansion of the press box with 300 new spots for reporters and additional TV and radio broadcasting booths, doubling in size of both the home and away team locker rooms, two new scoreboards, and in addition, a new field and drainage system. The stadium went from 15th to 8th largest in college football. The dedication game for the renovated stadium occurred on September 6, 1997, with a game against Georgia Tech that saw the Irish prevail 17–13.

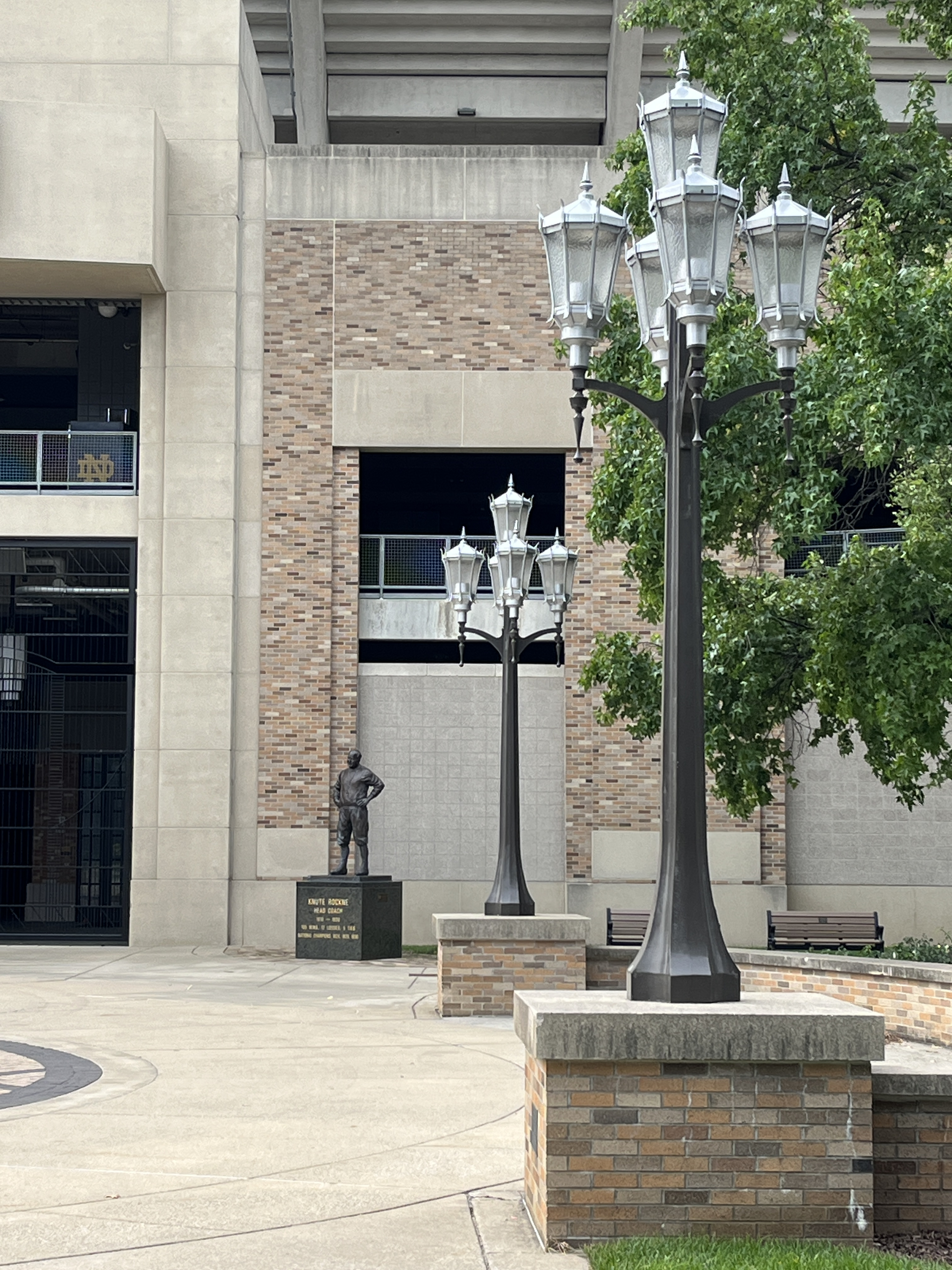
Knute Rockne statue

In October 2009, a statue of Knute Rockne was unveiled near the north gate of the stadium.

On September 3, 2011, the stadium witnessed its first ever evacuation. During a game against South Florida, severe weather and a lightning storm forced a successful and smooth evacuation at halftime.

On January 29, 2014, the university announced plans to attach three new buildings to the stadium, totaling more than 750,000 square feet (70,000 m^{2}) in expansions and costing about $400 million, with a timetable of 33 months for completion. After the completion of the Campus Crossroads Project, the official seating capacity of the stadium was listed at 77,622. The renovation also included the addition of a Jumbotron in the south end zone.

The project was completed in January 2018. The first game in the newly renovated stadium took place on September 2, 2017, when the Irish beat the Temple Owls 49–16.

On December 20, 2024, Notre Dame hosted in-state foe Indiana in the first College Football Playoff game played in an on-campus stadium, defeating the Hoosiers 27–17. The Irish went on to the national championship game that season. It was also the first home game not televised by NBC since November 17, 1990 (due to it being a playoff game and therefore unaffiliated with Notre Dame's sponsors), when ESPN broadcast the Irish' 24–21 loss to Penn State.

=== Traditions ===
A yellow sign with blue lettering reading "Play Like a Champion Today" is displayed in a stairwell between the home team's locker room and the tunnel leading to the field.

This sign dates back to 1986, when Lou Holtz came across a photo in a Notre Dame book with the sign “Play Like A Champion Today.” After asking around and coming up with no one remembering the sign and what had happened to it, he had a new sign painted and placed. This original sign was painted by Laurie Wenger in the fall of 1986. In 1991, NBC, which had just given the university its own marquee TV deal, showcased the sign by filming the players hitting it as they entered the field. Today, it is a tradition by players to touch it on their way out of the locker room. Above the sign is a listing of Notre Dame's eleven national championships.

For 39 seasons from 1982 to 2020, Michael Collins served as the Public Address Announcer for Notre Dame football and the voice of Notre Dame Stadium. Collins is a 1967 graduate of Notre Dame and had a nearly 40-year career as a reporter, producer, news director and news anchor for WNDU-TV and WSBT-TV in South Bend. During his tenure, Collins coined and popularized the phrase "Here Come the Irish!" as the football team ran out of the tunnel before each game. Today, the phrase is used widely by announcers and fans in a variety of sports. Collins announced 233 consecutive Notre Dame football games at the stadium before retiring after the 2020 season.

One of the most popular stadium traditions is the traffic safety messages delivered on the P.A. by Indiana State Police Sgt. Tim McCarthy at the end of the 3rd quarter of each game. Starting each message with "May I Have Your Attention Please?" McCarthy began reading the safety messages during the 1960 season. In order to grab the crowds' attention more easily, McCarthy began adding humorous driving-related quips and puns at the end of each message. These puns quickly became a fan favorite and a staple on game days. Examples of these quips included, “The trip home will be heavenly … if you drive like an angel” and “Keep your driving well-polished to avoid having a bad finish.” McCarthy would deliver these messages live at the stadium for 55 years until his retirement in 2015. Recordings from past messages are still replayed at Notre Dame Stadium to this day. McCarthy would pass away in 2020 at age 89.

== Structure and architecture ==
As originally built, the seating capacity was 54,000 but could hold as many as 61,000 with additional temporary bleachers. By 1966, its capacity increased to 59,075, mainly by reducing the average seat width from 18 to 17 inches (45.7 to 43.2 cm). In 1997, 21,000 new seats were added to the stadium, bringing the seating capacity to 80,795. After the 2014-2017 Campus Crossroads renovation, the seating decreased to 77,622.

There has never been any advertising or corporate signage allowed in the stadium, and the decorations are simple and traditional. Notre Dame explicitly tried to maintain the look and feel of the stadium in line with the original stadium built by Rockne in the 1930s.

=== Field ===
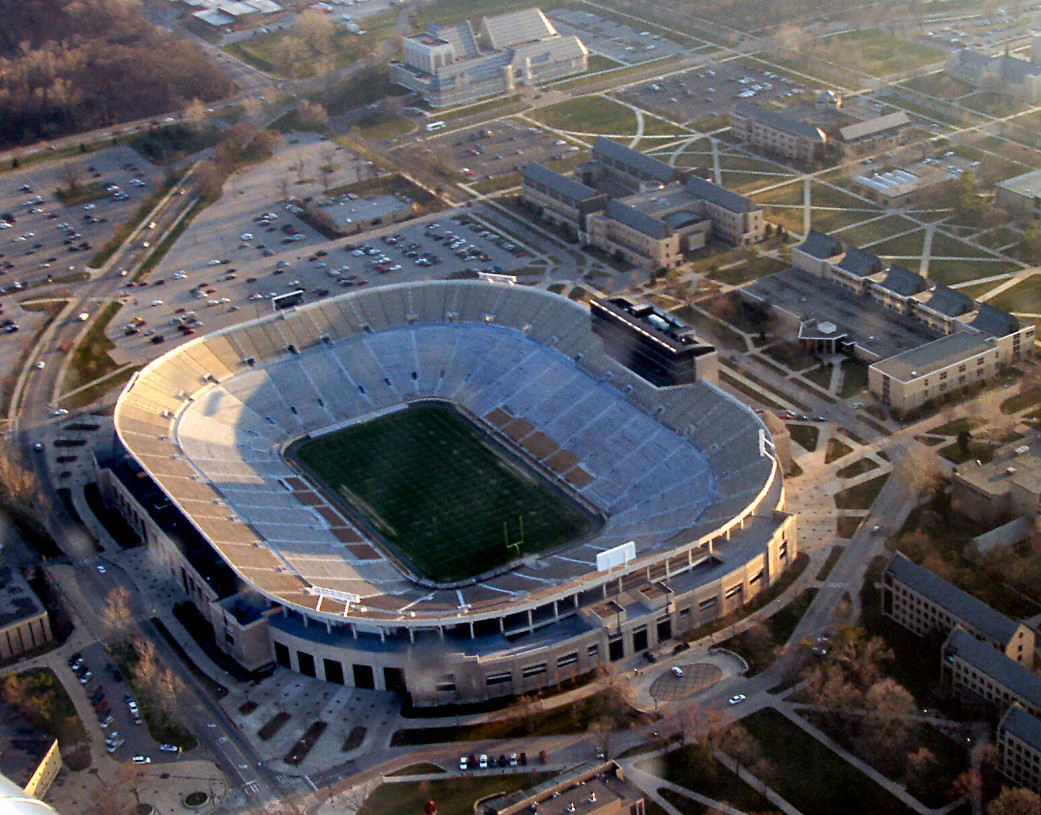
Aerial view of the stadium in 2005, before the Campus Crossroads expansion.

The playing surface had always been natural grass through 2013, but it was announced on April 12, 2014, that after the commencement weekend, the playing field would be replaced with an infilled artificial turf. Notre Dame athletic director Jack Swarbrick, in making the announcement, cited recent difficulties with maintaining an acceptable grass surface and added that the change would allow the stadium to be used for football practices and non-football events. During 2013, the university replaced the grass surface four times, including twice during the football season. The artificial turf installation, as scheduled, began after Commencement Weekend on May 16–18, 2014, and the university sold 2-by-5-foot (61 by 152 cm) sections of the old turf to the public for $150 each.

The decoration of the field is minimalist and traditional and has changed little since 1930 and the times of Knute Rockne. Unlike most football stadiums, the end zones do not feature the name of the school or team. Each end zone features nine diagonal white lines, for a total of eighteen, each at a 42º angle and pointing towards the Golden Dome. Both combine to symbolize the year 1842, when the school was first established. This design was used in 2014 when FieldTurf was installed (where the lines were impregnated into the turf directly), but a similar design has been used since 1930, when each end zone featured 30 diagonal white lines. The renovation in 2014 also saw the addition of the ND monogram, symbol of the athletics program, at the midfield, and small green shamrocks at the 35-yard. No other decoration is present on the field, except for occasional logos denoting events such as the 150th anniversary of the university in 1992.

=== Lighting ===
Prior to the 1997 expansion, Notre Dame Stadium lacked permanent field lights. In 1982, portable lighting by Musco Lighting was used for the first night game in the stadium's history on September 18 versus Michigan. Permanent lights were installed as part of the expansion. The lights were paid for by NBC, which has held the exclusive television rights to all home games since 1991. The permanent lights were added primarily to ensure sufficient lighting for mid-afternoon games in November; the university's agreements with NBC from 1991 to 2010 stipulated that there be no home night games. However, the stadium hosted its first night game in 21 years on October 22, 2011, when the Irish hosted USC. It was announced in 2015 that Musco would be installing a LED field lighting system as part of the 2014–2017 stadium renovation and expansion project.

=== Touchdown Jesus ===
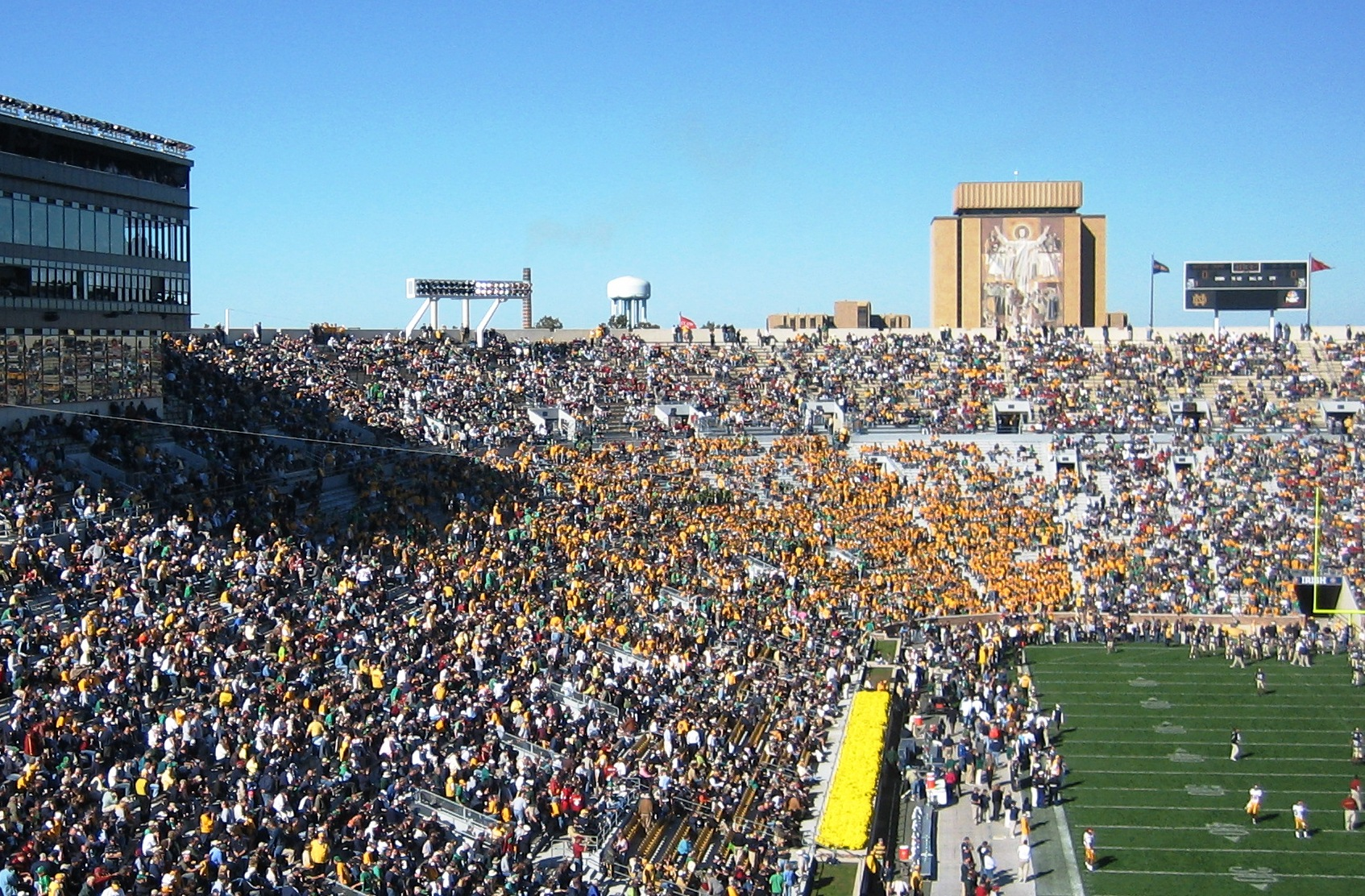
The Word of Life mural, commonly known as Touchdown Jesus, is visible from inside the stadium.

The stadium is known for its view to the north of Touchdown Jesus, a nickname given to the large mural entitled The Word of Life by Millard Sheets of the resurrected Jesus. Installed in 1964 on the Hesburgh Library, the mosaic wall looms over the stadium. The mural's nickname is derived from Jesus' upraised arms, which are similar in appearance to the raised arms of a referee signifying a touchdown. The expansion of the stadium in the late 1990s partially obscured the view of the mural from the playing field. The Word of Life mural was a gift of Mr. and Mrs. Howard V. Phalin of Winnetka, Illinois.

== Campus Crossroads ==
In January 2014, the university announced a $400 million enhancement of the stadium, the Campus Crossroads project. This expansion features three 8-story buildings on the west, south, and east sides of the stadium. The expansion added more than 750,000 square feet (70,000 m^{2}) of teaching, research, and performance space. The enhancement added new premium stadium seats. The three buildings are called the Duncan Student Center on the west, O'Neill Hall on the south, and Corbett Family Hall on the east. The project was completed in January 2018. The project was designed by the SLAM collective, with the HOK design firm as a consultant. Barton Malow served as the design-build contractor.

=== Duncan Student Center ===
The Duncan Student Center serves as a student center hosting a gym and climbing wall, meeting and event spaces, several dining and food options, student media and club offices, and the career center. Duncan is a 404,331-square-foot building and is located on the West side of the stadium, between the Lou Holtz (Gate D) and Gate E gates, facing DeBartolo Hall.

The ninth floor hosts a terrace overlooking the stadium with premium seating, booths for football coaches and game management staff, university seating boxes and a hospitality club for football games. The eight floors host seating and Rasmus Family Club, an event space that includes a terrace overlooking the ballroom below, in addition to hosting premium stadium seating. The seventh floor hosts the Dahnke Ballroom, a large two-story event and reception area with windows overlooking the field. The ballroom is used often for student events and dances throughout the year. Overlooking the stadium, the seventh floor also hosts seating and the new broadcast position for NBC Sports. The sixth floor is mechanical space. The fifth floor hosts the Meruelo Family Career Center for Career Development, which serves both the undergraduate and graduate student bodies. The center has more than 40 interview rooms and also hosts the Undergraduate Career Services, Graduate Career Services, Mendoza Graduate Business Career Services, and an employer engagement team for alumni and recruiters.

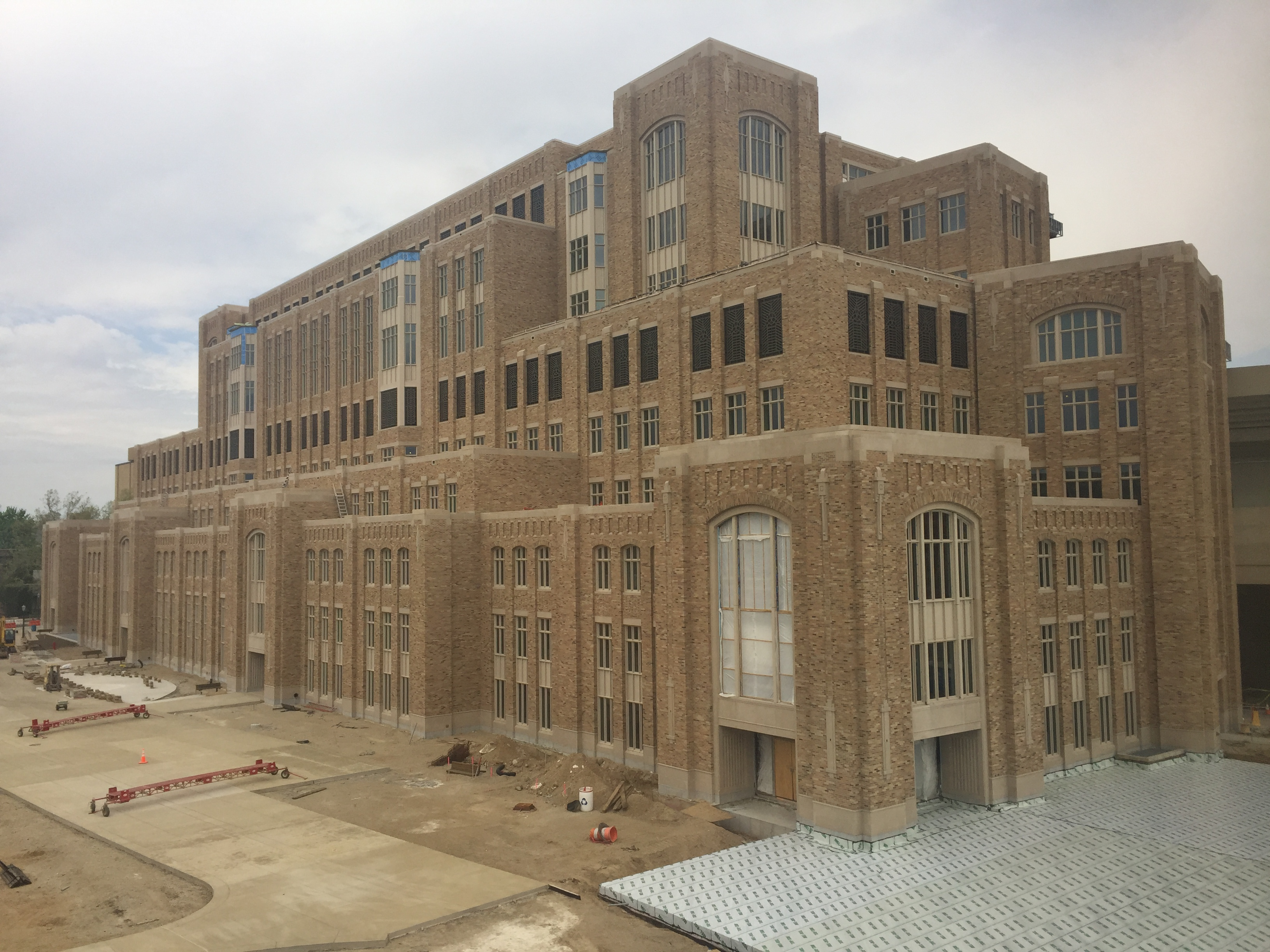
Duncan Student Center under construction in 2017, part of the Campus Crossroads project.

The third and fourth floors host the Tripp and Sheila Smith Center for Recreational Sports, an 80,000-square-foot recreational center and student gym. It features a basketball court with bleachers, a 13,000-square-foot cardio and free-weight area, an open area modular exercise space, three studios for yoga, dance, martial arts, and group fitness instruction, office space for staff and personal trainers, a student lounge, a spin center, and men's and women's locker rooms, a 260-meter three-lane indoor running track, two boxing rings, over 1,500 square feet of open space for individual exercise, and a four-story rock-climbing wall (which is also in part located on the second floor). The second floor hosts the student media center and climbing wall. This includes the media laboratory, newsrooms and radio studios, an open television studio and all student media operations such as NDTV, The Voice of the Fighting Irish (WVFI) internet radio, WSND-FM, the Dome yearbook, Scholastic magazine and The Juggler. The floor also includes the Offices of Residential Life, the Grojean Family Loft (a study and lounge space open to all students,) and a graduate student-only study and lounge space, as well as the offices of the Graduate Student Life and the Graduate Student Union. The first floor hosts student center spaces, including the Midfield Commons, a lounge and socializing space, the Innovation Lounge, study spaces and offices. Dining spaces on the first floor include Hagerty Family Café, Modern Market, and Star Ginger Asian Grill and Noodle Bar, a Vietnamese micro-restaurant.

The Duncan Student Center hosts several pieces of artwork. Sculptor Ralph Helmick's work Edifice hangs on the second floor, above the dining area. The work consists of a reproduction of the campus landmark of the Main Building, made up of 4,100 small pewter heads hung on 2,221 cables suspended from the ceiling. The pewter heads, which are silver except for the golden ones making up the dome, were created by scanning the likeness of students, staff and faculty members. The scans were conducted in November 2017, and the work was installed in October 2018. The Midfield Commons hosts the work Prevalence: Sacred Traces by Juan Sanchez. The work, which was created to celebrate diversity in the community, is composed of a mural in the shape of stained glass windows (inspired by those of the Basilica of the Sacred Heart) decorated with many images and symbols from across different cultures and traditions. The decorated bronze door pulls of the building were designed by artist Gail Folwell and are inspired by the visual style of the Word of Life mural and depict students engaged in sports, leisure, academics, arts, prayer and more.

Funding for the center was provided by entrepreneur Raymond Duncan, a Notre Dame alumnus who was the chairman and chief executive officer of Duncan Oil in Denver, Colorado. He was also the founder of Silver Oak Cellars and Twomey Cellars, as well as of Purgatory Resort in Colorado. A 1952 Notre Dame graduate, Duncan was a former member of the College of Arts and Letters and the Snite Museum of Art Advisory Councils. In 2007 the Duncan family provided the funding to build the men's dorm, Duncan Hall and the establishment of the Duncan Endowment for Excellence in American Art, in addition to supporting the Institute for Scholarship in Liberal Arts, Monogram Club, Department of Athletics and McCormack Scholarship.

=== O'Neill Hall ===
O'Neill Hall hosts the Department of Music and Sacred Music, including a 174-seat recital and performance hall, the music library, lecture halls, classrooms, rehearsal and seminar rooms, offices, faculty offices, a music lab for studio production, and practice rooms. It also houses stadium and sport-related spaces and a club lounge. O'Neill Hall is built around the Frank Leahy Gate, which is the grand entrance to the stadium, and has 106,809 square footage.

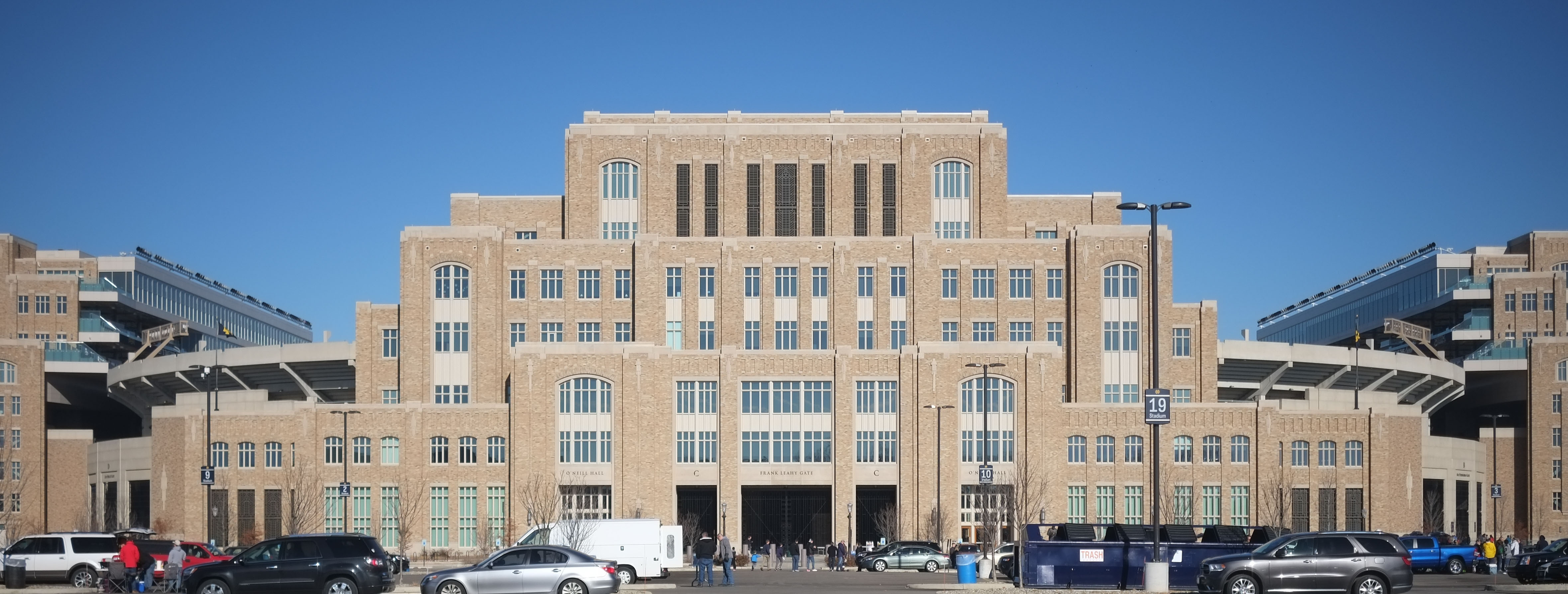
O'Neill Hall and the main entrance of the stadium after completion of the Campus Crossroads project.

The seventh floor is dedicated to mechanical space, mainly for the support of the new large scoreboard on the exterior, which is 54.1 feet high and 95.5 feet wide. Its large LED display screen contains 4,798,976 pixels, the most of any NCAA outdoor arena. The scoreboard is lined by 16 mm sideline ribbon boards, 3.78 feet high and 393 feet long, which display game statistics. The fifth and sixth floors are dedicated to the Sacred Music Program and house music departmental offices, teaching studios and practice rooms. The fourth floor houses Foley's, a high-end sports bar and restaurant. It is an 8,200-square-foot club, a highly themed area decorated with old Notre Dame memorabilia, including wooden seating from the old stadium. The club features Harper's Bar, named in honor of Jesse Harper, Notre Dame football coach from 1913 to 1917. The club is open only to members and during home games, but it also hosts private events. The third floor hosts the Michuda Family Visiting Artist Rehearsal Hall as well as seminar rooms, two mid-sized classrooms, a large lecture hall, and the music library, which was relocated from the Hesburgh Library. The first and second houses are the Frank Leahy Gate, which is the grand entrance to the stadium. The first floor also hosts LaBar Family Performance and Rehearsal Hall, both 2,200-square-feet. The recital hall has 175 seats, offering a more intimate atmosphere than other spaces on campus. It features a traditional stage, fixed seating, and a formal atmosphere for classical concert music. The Performance Hall instead is more an interdisciplinary performance space, accommodating alternative types of musical events in combination with other media, such as projected text visual images, acting, lighting, and dance. It has flexible seating and staging options in a “black box” style setting that can host avant-garde performance and experimentation.

The building was constructed in part thanks to a $25 million donation from Helen and Charles Schwab in honor of her brother, Notre Dame alumnus and trustee Joseph O’Neill III. The O’Neill family had previously also provided donations for the construction of a men's residence hall, O’Neill Family Hall, and a sundial on the south side of Jordan Hall of Science.

=== Corbett Family Hall ===
Corbett Family Hall houses the Departments of Anthropology and Psychology. It also houses the Rex and Alice A. Martin Media Center, with a 2,000-square-foot studio, and teaching space for the Department of Film, Television and Theatre. It also houses the stadium and sports-related spaces, including the press box. Corbett is a 280,000-square-foot building and is located on the East side of the stadium, between the Dan Devine (Gate A) and Ara Parseghian (Gate B) gates, facing the Edmund P. Joyce Center.

The first floor hosts the Martin Digital Media Center and Notre Dame Studios. The Martin Media Center is an 18,000-square-foot production facility for live and recorded events that houses two state-of-the-art control rooms of equal capability with seating for nine crew members. The center is used for student classes and productions and for stadium media production on game days. Also housed on the floor are Notre Dame Studios, with four control rooms equipped for multi-camera live and recorded production, and The Fighting Irish Media Center, with two control rooms. The innovation center on the floor is a 1,300-square-foot flexible space for new and emerging media that can accommodate 50 participants. The second floor houses the Department of Anthropology, with research laboratories, offices, study and meeting rooms, classrooms, and social event spaces. The third, fourth, and fifth floors house the Department of Psychology's offices, more than 30 research labs, and classrooms. The third floor is mostly cognitive psychology, the fourth floor is mainly behavioral psychology, and the fifth floor is mainly a mixture of relationship psychology and others. The anthropology and psychology departments, both in the College of Arts and Letters, were scattered around campus and without a single location before the opening of Corbett. Similarly to the Duncan Student Center, the sixth floor is dedicated to mechanical storage space. The seventh floor hosts the Downes Club, a large ballroom and hospitality space that is used for events and receptions and becomes a 100-seat classroom on non-game days. The eighth floor houses the Hank Family Forum, which is similar to the Rasmus in Duncan, with the exception that it does not have an indoor premium seating area and offers socializing and event space and a terrace overlooking the Downes Club. The ninth floor houses the press boxes, print media and radio facilities, as well as the game-day hospitality space. Seven on Nine is a premium seating area and reception space overlooking the field and is named after the team's seven Heisman Trophy winners. The north side of the ninth floor has premium seating and boxes for the visiting team.

Alumnus Richard Corbett donated $25 million towards construction of the building. He received a bachelor's degree in history from Notre Dame in 1960 and later a business degree from Harvard. He worked on John F. Kennedy's presidential election campaign, served in the White House, and as a financial manager for the Kennedy family, followed by a role as business manager for Robert F. Kennedy's presidential campaign. He currently is the CEO and president of Concorde Companies, a Florida real estate business.

== Attendance ==
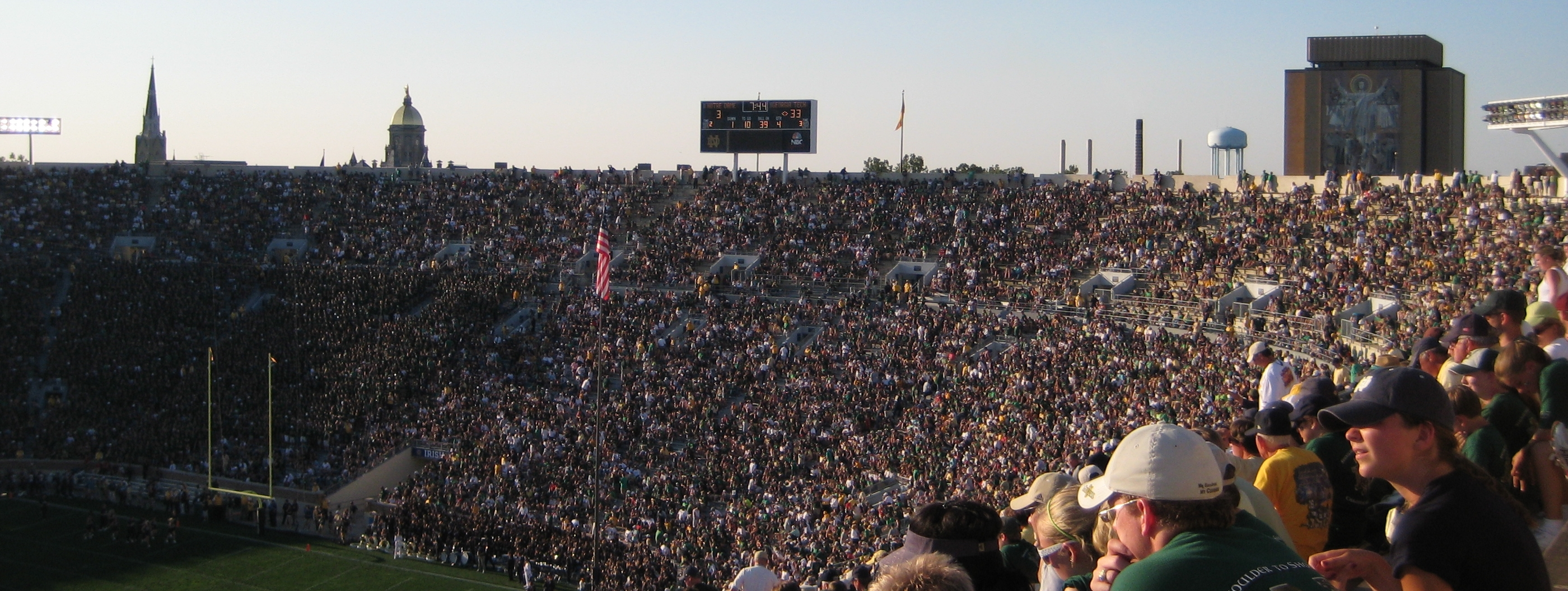
A view from the east side of the Notre Dame Stadium showing (from left to right) the Basilica of the Sacred Heart, the Golden Dome atop the Administration Building and the Hesburgh Library with the mural of Touchdown Jesus.

Prior to 1966, attendance figures were based on an actual count of patrons through the gates. The largest crowd to attend a home game prior to expansion was 61,296 in 1962, against Purdue on October 6. Since 1966, attendance figures have been based on paid admissions with a fixed number of tickets available, accounting for the familiar 59,075 figure through the 1996 season. Until Ara Parseghian arrived as coach at Notre Dame in 1964, sellouts were not the norm. Since then, tickets for Notre Dame football have been notoriously hard to come by. As of the end of the 2015 season, there have been 249 consecutive sellouts at Notre Dame Stadium and 294 sellouts in the past 295 games dating back to 1964. The lone exception was a 1973 game against Air Force which had been moved midseason by ABC to Thanksgiving Day and was played with the students absent. The announced attendance was 57,235. Attendance at all five home games in 1965 exceeded 59,000 as well. It is expected that this streak will end at the Navy game on November 16, 2019. The university cites an unusual schedule of 3 home games in November as a factor.

The official capacity was listed at 80,225 when the stadium was first expanded. A subsequent computer revision put it at 80,012 in 1998 and 80,232 in 2000. Sideline bleachers, which had been removed during expansion, were put back in after a few years, bringing the figure to 80,795 in 2001. In January 2014, the University of Notre Dame announced the campus crossroads project. A $400 million renovation would add luxury boxes and increase the stadium's capacity to around 85,000, but after the project was completed in 2017, the seats were made wider, and the number decreased to 77,622, which is the present capacity of the stadium. The project began after the conclusion of the 2014 football season and finished in time for the 2017 season.

== Other events ==
=== Concerts ===
The stadium had never hosted a music concert until 2018, with Garth Brooks being the first artist to hold a concert to be held at the stadium.

Date	Artist	Opening act(s)	Tour / Concert name	Attendance	Revenue	Notes
October 20, 2018	Garth Brooks	—N/a	Garth: Live at Notre Dame	84,000	—N/a	First concert at the stadium
May 7, 2022	Garth Brooks	Mitch Rossell	The Garth Brooks Stadium Tour	80,000	—N/a	
June 25, 2022	Billy Joel	Andrew McMahon In the Wilderness	Billy Joel in Concert	45,000	—N/a	
September 6, 2025	Zach Bryan	Shane Gillis; Dermot Kennedy	2025 World Tour	81,000		
April 18, 2026	Luke Combs	Dierks Bentley; Ty Myers; Jake Worthington; Thelma & James	My Kind of Saturday Night World Tour			
September 4, 2026	AC/DC	The Pretty Reckless	Power Up Tour			
October 2, 2027	Bon Jovi		Forever Tour			

=== Ice hockey ===
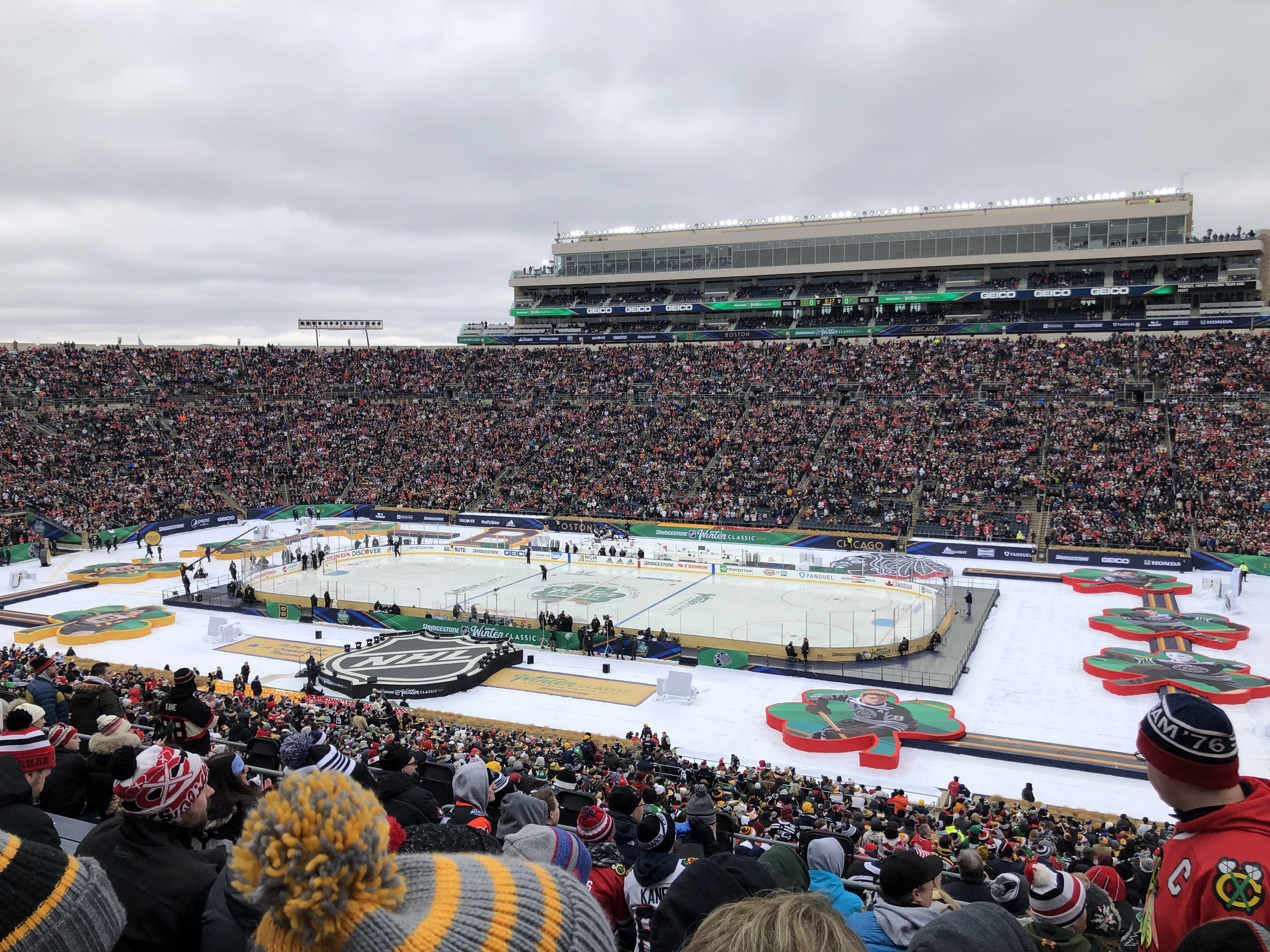
The 2019 NHL Winter Classic at Notre Dame Stadium.

The stadium hosted the 2019 NHL Winter Classic on New Year's Day between the Chicago Blackhawks and Boston Bruins, and four days later longtime rivals Michigan and Notre Dame clashed on the same ice, with the nickname "Let's Take This Outside" being applied to the game.

Date	Away Team	Score	Home Team	Attendance
January 1, 2019	Boston Bruins	4–2	Chicago Blackhawks	76,126
January 5, 2019	Michigan Wolverines	4–2	Notre Dame Fighting Irish	23,422

=== Rugby ===
Date	Away Team	Score	Home Team	Attendance
June 9, 1984	Canada	1–21	United States	-
July 13, 2002	Canada	36–13	United States	2,500

=== Soccer ===
Date	Away Team	Score	Home Team	Attendance
July 19, 2019	(Germany) Borussia Dortmund	3–2	(England) Liverpool	40,361
July 27, 2024	(Scotland) Celtic	4–1	(England) Chelsea	

== See also ==
- List of NCAA Division I FBS football stadiums
- Lists of stadiums

Events and tenants
Preceded by Citi Field	Host of the NHL Winter Classic; 2019	Succeeded by Cotton Bowl
