= Misericordia Home =

Charitable home in Chicago, Illinois

Misericordia
- Formation: 1921; 104 years ago
- Type: 501(c)(3) non-profit organization
- Headquarters: Chicago, Illinois, U.S.
- Website: misericordia.com

Misericordia Home is a not-for-profit developmental home for persons with mild to profound developmental disabilities in Chicago, Illinois. It is run by the Sisters of Mercy and operated under the auspices of the Archdiocese of Chicago.

== History ==
It began as a maternity hospital for women of meager means in 1921, and expanded to serve young children with developmental disabilities by 1954. In 1976 the Angel Guardian Orphanage on 2001 Devon Avenue closed, and a portion of that land was given to Misericordia Home. In 2016 the organization opened up for care of elderly people with disabilities. In 2022, the organization opened a bakery and cafe which employs its residents. The following year, in 2023, Misericordia House's former executive director Sister Rosemary Connelly, R.S.M. was awarded the Laetare Medal by the University of Notre Dame. It currently supports more than 600 children and adults with developmental disabilities.
