= List of Fordham University commencement speakers =

The following is a list of keynote speakers at the commencement of Fordham University, 1941–present.

Year	Speaker(s)	Notes	Ref.
1941	Bp. J. Francis McIntyre		
1942	Rev. Robert Gannon	President of Fordham	
1943	Rev. Robert Gannon	President of Fordham	
1944	Rev. Robert Gannon	President of Fordham	
1945	Maj. Gen. Sir Walter Maxwell Scott		
1946	Gov. Thomas Dewey	President Truman also received an honorary degree and gave an address, but this was not at June commencement; it was in May.	
1947	Msgr. Ferdinand Vandry	Director of Laval University	
1948	Rev. Robert Gannon	President of Fordham	
1949	Rev. Laurence McGinley	President of Fordham	
1950	Rev. Laurence McGinley	President of Fordham	
1951	Rev. Laurence McGinley	President of Fordham	
1952	Msgr. John Middleton	Education secretary, Archdioscese of New York	
1953	Rev. Laurence McGinley	President of Fordham	
1954	Robert D. Murphy	Deputy under secretary of state	
1955	Rev. Laurence McGinley	President of Fordham	
1956	Rev. Laurence McGinley	President of Fordham	
1957	Rev. Laurence McGinley	President of Fordham	
1958	Gov. W. Averell Harriman	Governor of New York	
1959	Richard Cardinal Cushing	Archbishop of Boston	
1960	Dr. Charles H. Malik	President of United Nations General Assembly	
1961	Joseph W. McGovern	Fordham law professor and member of NYS Board of Regents	
1962	Teodoro Moscoso	Coordinator of the Alliance for Progress	
1963	Sargent Shriver	First director of the Peace Corps	
1964	Francis Cardinal Spellman	Archbishop of New York	
1965	Vice President Hubert H. Humphrey	Vice President of the United States	
1966	Rev. Vincent T O'Keefe	President of Fordham	
1967	Sen. Robert F. Kennedy	Former attorney general and United States senator	
1968	Leo McGlaughlin	Eulogy and mass for Robert F. Kennedy	
1969	Sen. Ted Kennedy	Former United States senator	
1970	Sen. Daniel Patrick Moynihan	US Senator from New York	
1971	James Hester	President of New York University	
1972	Kurt Waldheim	United Nations secretary general and former Wehrmacht spy	
1973	Dr. Ernest Boyer	Chancellor of State University of New York	
1974	Gov. Malcolm Wilson	Governor of New York	
1975	Hon. William Hughes Mulligan	Judge of the United States Court of Appeals for the Second Circuit	
1976	Gov. Hugh Carey	Governor of New York	
1977	Thomas A. Murphy	Chairman of General Motors	
1978	Alan Alda	Actor	
1979	Zbigniew Brzezinski	National Security advisor	
1980	Sec. Patricia Harris	United States secretary of Health and Human Services	
1981	Paulo Evaristo Cardinal Arns	Archbishop of São Paulo	
1982	Seamus Heaney	Irish poet	
1983	Felix G. Rohatyn	Investment banker and diplomat	
1984	Rev. James Finlay	Former president of Fordham	
1985	Gov. Mario Cuomo	Governor of New York	
1986	Robert Hayes	Founder of Coalition for the Homeless	
1987	Sen. Al D'Amato	US Senator from New York	
1988	Charles Osgood	Radio and television commentator and writer	
1989	Timothy Healy, S.J.	Former president of Georgetown University	
1990	William P. Ford, J.D.	Lawyer and bond trader	
1991	Marian Wright Edelman	Children's rights activist	
1992	Rep. Dr. John Brademas	US Congressman from Indiana	
1993	Peter Steinfels	Journalist specializing in religious topics	
1994	Jonathan Kozol	Writer best known for his works on American public education	
1995	Mary Robinson	President of Ireland	
1996	Rev. Joseph O'Hare	Jesuit priest, civic leader, and Fordham president	
1997	Mary Higgins Clark	Author of suspense novels	
1998	Hon. Joseph McLaughlin	Judge of the United States Court of Appeals for the Second Circuit	
1999	George Mitchell; David Copperfield	Former US Senator from Maine; magician	
2000	Vin Scully	Sportscaster	
2001	Bill Cosby	Comedian and actor	
2002	Gerald Levin	Mass-media businessman	
2003	Ted Koppel	Broadcast journalist	
2004	Tim Russert	Television journalist and lawyer	
2005	John Sexton, J.D.	Lawyer and former president of New York University	
2006	Chris Matthews	Political commentator, talk show host, and author	
2007	Willie Randolph	Major League Baseball player	
2008	Charlie Rose	Television journalist and talk show host	
2009	Tom Brokaw, Michael Bloomberg	Journalist and author, New York City mayor	
2010	Mary McAleese	President of Ireland	
2011	Brian Williams	NBC News journalist	
2012	John O. Brennan	Former director of the Central Intelligence Agency	
2013	Richard Engel	NBC News chief foreign correspondent	
2014	Tino Martinez	Professional baseball player	
2015	Lordina Dramani Mahama	First Lady of Ghana	
2016	David J. Skorton, M.D.	Physician, academic, and CEO of the Smithsonian Institution	
2017	Óscar Rodríguez Maradiaga, Sen. Chuck Schumer	Salesian and cardinal of the Catholic Church from Honduras; New York state senator	
2018	Dennis Walcott	President & CEO of the Queens Library and former New York City schools chancellor	
2019	Tim Shriver	Disability rights activist and chairman of the Special Olympics	
2020	Rev. James J. Martin	Jesuit priest and author	
2021	Adm. Michelle Howard	Former Vice Chief of Naval Operations	
2022	Calvin O. Butts	American pastor of Abyssinian Baptist Church	
2023	Stevie Wonder	Singer-songwriter, musician, and record producer	
2024	Joseph P. Kennedy III	United States special envoy to Northern Ireland for Economic Affairs	
2025	Regina Hall	Actress	
2026	Hoda Kotb	Journalist, author, and co-anchor of Today	
