= History of the Goddard Space Flight Center =

NASA Goddard Space Flight Center

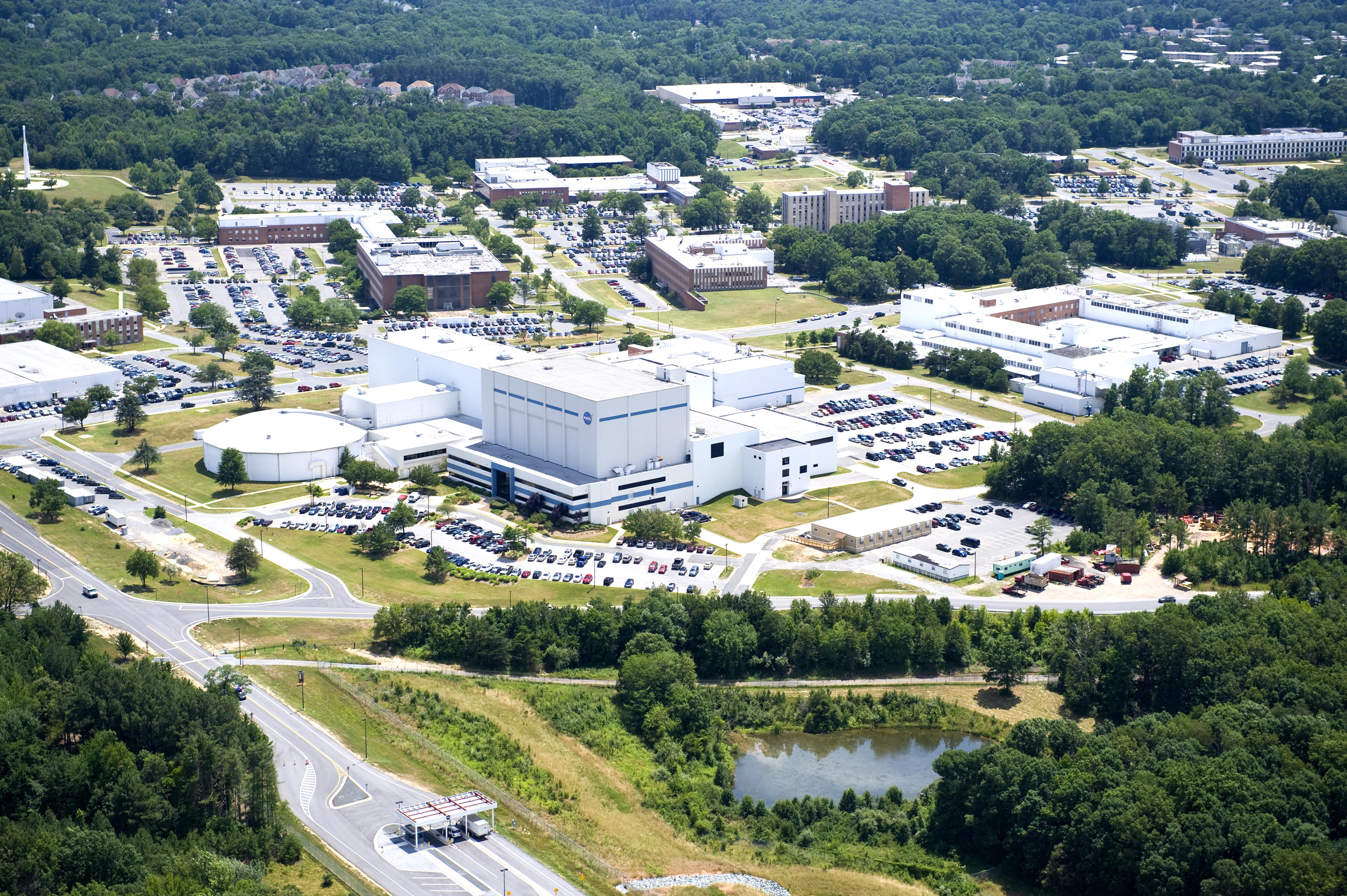
- Aerial view of the Goddard Space Flight Center

Agency overview
- Formed: May 1, 1959
- Jurisdiction: Federal government of the United States
- Headquarters: Greenbelt, MD

Goddard Space Flight Center (GSFC) is NASA's first, and oldest, space center. It is named after Robert H. Goddard, the father of modern rocketry. Throughout its history, the center has managed, developed, and operated many notable missions, including the Cosmic Background Explorer, the Hubble Space Telescope, the Tracking and Data Relay Satellite System (TDRSS), the Lunar Reconnaissance Orbiter, and the Solar Dynamics Observatory.

== Origin of GSFC ==
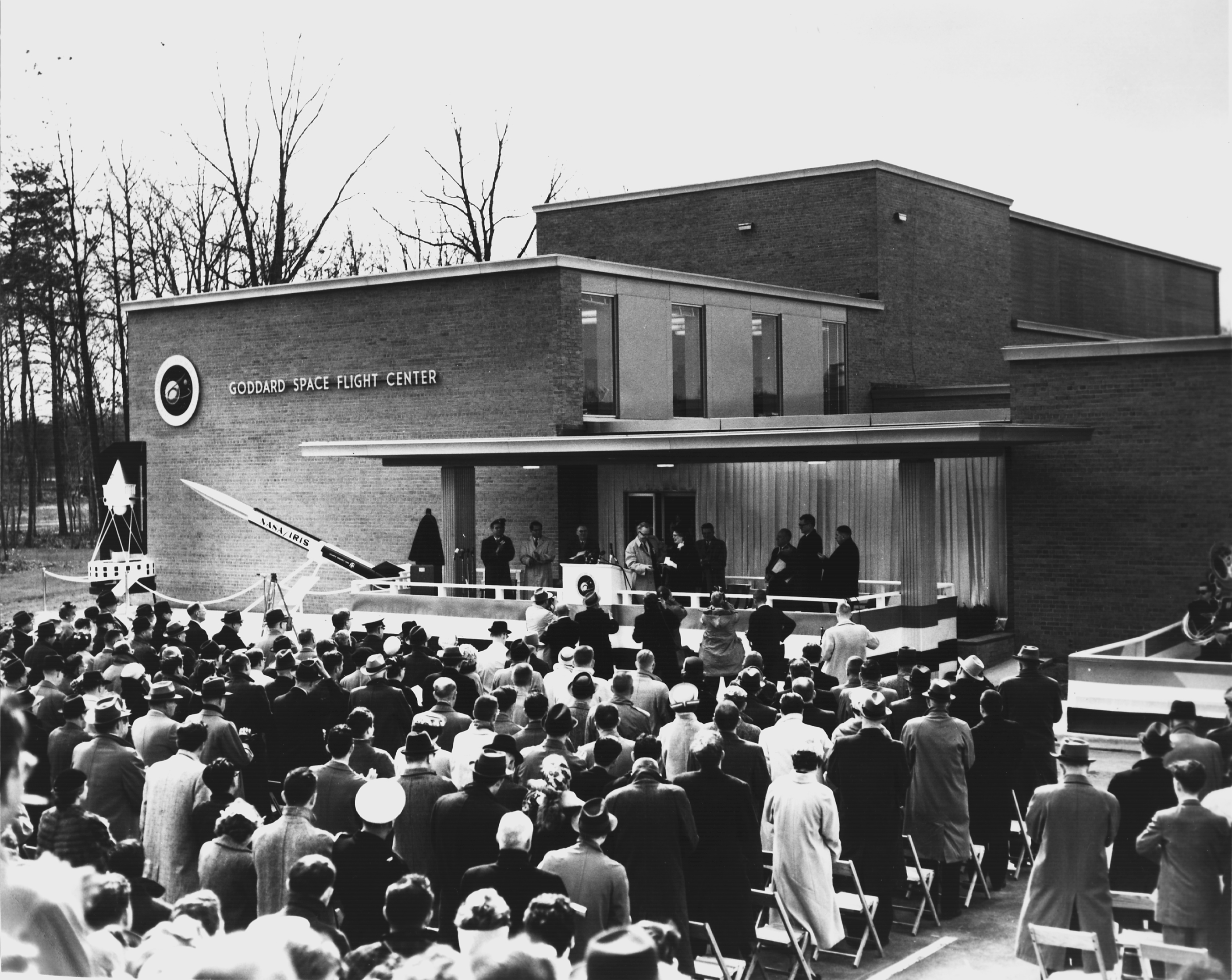
Photo from the opening day ceremony of the Goddard Space Flight Center on March 16, 1961.

On July 29, 1958, President Dwight D. Eisenhower signed the National Aeronautics and Space Act, establishing the National Aeronautics and Space Administration (NASA). When it began operations on October 1, 1958, NASA consisted mainly of the four laboratories and some 80 employees of the government's 46-year-old research agency, the National Advisory Committee for Aeronautics (NACA).

GSFC was established on May 1, 1959, as NASA's first space flight center.

Its original charter was to perform five major functions on behalf of NASA: technology development and fabrication, planning, scientific research, technical operations, and project management. Even today, the center is organized into several Directorates, each charged with one of these key functions.

== Role of GSFC ==
Until May 1, 1959, NASA's presence in Greenbelt, Maryland, was known as the Beltsville Space Center. It was then renamed the Goddard Space Flight Center (GSFC), after Robert H. Goddard, the father of modern rocketry. Its first 157 employees transferred from the United States Navy's Project Vanguard missile program, but continued their work at the Naval Research Laboratory in Washington, D.C. while the center was under construction.

On August 1, 1958, Senator J. Glenn Beall of Maryland announced in a press release that the new "outer space agency" (NASA) would establish a laboratory and plant at Greenbelt, Maryland. This was the first time public notice was drawn to what was to become Goddard Space Flight Center. Planning of the new Center continued through the rest of 1958 and by the end of the year events were ripening.

== History ==
=== 1959: The first year ===
On January 15, 1959, by action of the NASA Administrator, four divisions (Construction Division, Space Sciences Division, Theoretical Division, and the Vanguard Division) of NASA were designated as the new Beltsville Space Center. In a meeting held on February 12, 1959, for the purpose of surveying the organization and functions of the Beltsville Space Center, it was generally agreed that the Center probably would perform five major interrelated space science functions on behalf of NASA: Project Management, Research, Development and fabrication, Advanced planning, and Operations. On May 1, 1959, NASA Administrator T. Keith Glennan, in a public release, formally announced that the Beltsville Space Center would be re-designated the Goddard Space Flight Center "in commemoration of Dr. Robert H. Goddard, American pioneer in rocket research". In May 1959, Leopold Winkler, who had transferred to NASA with the Vanguard program, was appointed Chief, Technical Services for Goddard. In September 1959, Harry J. Goett was named Director of Goddard Space Flight Center. Goett came from Ames Research Center, where he had been Chief of the Full Scale and Flight Research Division.

On April 24, 1959, construction of the new space laboratory began on a site located on a 550-acre tract formerly part of the U.S. Department of Agriculture's Agricultural Research Center at Beltsville, Maryland. By September 1960, Building 1 was fully occupied and other buildings were well underway. Although much of the occupancy was on a temporary basis and the personnel complement was widely scattered from Anacostia, D.C., to Silver Spring, Maryland, and points between, the Goddard Space Flight Center had become a physical reality.

=== 1960–1969 ===
Goddard Space Flight Center contributed to Project Mercury, America's first human space flight program. The Center assumed a lead role for the project in its early days and managed the first 250 employees involved in the effort, who were stationed at Langley Research Center in Hampton, Virginia. However, the size and scope of Project Mercury soon prompted NASA to build a new "Manned Spacecraft Center", now the Johnson Space Center, in Houston, Texas. Project Mercury's personnel and activities were transferred there in 1961.

During the early crewed space flight years, including the missions of Project Mercury, Project Gemini and the Apollo program, GSFC was responsible for the management and operations of the communication networks. In 1961, Goddard tracking and data engineers were given responsibility for designing and managing the Mercury Space Flight Network (MSFN), the first consolidated communication network to support crewed space flight. Later, GSFC was responsible for the design, management, and operation of the Manned Space Flight Network (MSFN), Spacecraft Tracking and Data Acquisition Network (STADAN), and finally the Spaceflight Tracking and Data Network (STDN).

In April 1962, NASA launched Ariel 1 - a joint effort between Goddard and the United Kingdom and the first international satellite. Researchers in the U.K. developed the instruments for the satellite, and Goddard managed development of the satellite and the overall project.

=== 1970 - 1979 ===
The ending of the Apollo program brought a new era to Goddard. The drive to the Moon had unified NASA and garnered tremendous support for space efforts from Congress and the country in general. But once that goal was achieved, NASA's role, mission and funding became a little less clear. In some ways, Goddard's focus on scientific missions and a diversity of projects helped protect it from some of the cutbacks that accompanied the end of the Apollo program in 1972. Yet despite the cutbacks, the work at Goddard was still expanding into new areas, such as technology development and leveraging satellites to take advantage of the Space Shuttle.

=== 1980–1989 ===
Goddard Space Flight Center remained involved in the crewed space flight program, providing computer support and radar tracking of flights through a worldwide network of ground stations called the Spacecraft Tracking and Data Acquisition Network (STDN). However, the Center focused primarily on designing uncrewed satellites and spacecraft for scientific research missions. Goddard pioneered several fields of spacecraft development, including modular spacecraft design, which reduced costs and made it possible to repair satellites in orbit. Goddard's Solar Max satellite, launched in 1980, was repaired by astronauts on the Space Shuttle Challenger in 1984.

=== 1990–1999 ===
The Hubble Space Telescope, launched in 1990, remains in service and continues to grow in capability thanks to its modular design and multiple servicing missions by the Space Shuttle. Early this decade, another mission Goddard managed, the Compton Gamma Ray Observatory launched, which observed 2,700 gammy ray-bursts and definitively showed that the majority of gamma-ray bursts must originate in distant galaxies and therefore must be enormously energetic. A quote from the official history of Goddard states:

In short, Goddard's work in the early 1990s helped bring NASA out of the dark post-Challenger era and helped create in a new energy, enthusiasm and curiosity about both planet Earth and other bodies in the universe. We now had the technology to reach back to the very beginning of time and the outer reaches of the universe.

The Land Analysis System (LAS) was also a project developed at Goddard in the 90's. LAS is a software system that analyzes, displays, and manages multispectral and other image data types and was developed in Goddard. The software was used by the U.S. Department of Agriculture Hydrology and Remote Sensing Laboratory in 1994, and was also used in Hawaii in volcanology investigation in 1993. LAS was installed on Goddard computers to aid in earth science research as well. The software was in development up until the termination of the LAS project in 1991 after NASA headquarters ceased funding in favor of the newer Earth Observing System (EOS).

=== 2000–present ===
Today, the Center remains involved in each of NASA's key programs. Goddard has developed more instruments for planetary exploration than any other organization, among them scientific instruments sent to every planet in the Solar System. The center's contribution to the Earth Science Enterprise includes several spacecraft in the Earth Observing System fleet as well as EOSDIS, a science data collection, processing, and distribution system. For the crewed space flight program, Goddard develops tools for use by astronauts during extra-vehicular activity, and built and operates the Lunar Reconnaissance Orbiter and the Solar Dynamics Observatory.

== People ==
Notable scientists and engineers from GSFC include:

- Carrie Anderson - an American planetary scientist, best known for her work on Titan astrochemistry
- Robert Bindschadler
- Beth A. Brown - astrophysicist
- Fred Espenak - an American astrophysicist, best known for his work on eclipse predictions
- Gene Carl Feldman
- Orlando Figueroa - formerly, the Director, Applied Engineering & Technology at the NASA GSFC (as the "Director of Engineering" he manages the full scope of engineering activities at Goddard), previously the NASA Mars Czar Director for Mars Exploration and the Director for the Solar System Division in the Office of Space Science at NASA Headquarters.
- James E. Hansen - The head the NASA Goddard Institute for Space Studies, an adjunct professor in the Department of Earth and Environmental Sciences at Columbia University. He is best known for his research in the field of climatology, his testimony on climate change to congressional committees in 1988 that helped raise broad awareness of global warming, and his advocacy of action to limit the impacts of climate change.
- Marc Kuchner
- Adena Williams Loston - formerly, Chief Education Officer at NASA Headquarters in Washington, DC, and Director of Education and Special Assistant for Suborbital and Special Orbital Projects Directorate for the NASA GSFC. She was recognized with several NASA awards, including the Outstanding Leadership Medal and the Exceptional Achievement Medal from the Goddard Space Flight Center. She is now the President of St. Philip's College, in San Antonio, Texas.
- Lissette Martinez
- John C. Mather - an American astrophysicist, cosmologist and Nobel Prize in Physics laureate for his work on COBE with George Smoot.
- Judith Racusin - an American astrophysicist, research aerospace technologist
- Aki Roberge - an American astrophysicist and Study Scientist for the LUVOIR mission.
- Gerald Soffen - formerly, a Viking Project scientist at NASA Langley Research Center. He held numerous leadership positions in both Earth and Life Sciences at NASA GSFC and HQ respectively. He also established the Office of University Programs while at GSFC and set up numerous educational programs including the NASA Academy. Later, he also helped establish NASA's Astrobiology Institute.

=== Center Directors ===
The following persons had served as a director of the Goddard Space Flight Center:

No.	Image	Director	Start	End	Notes
1		Harry J. Goett	September 1, 1959	July 1965	
Acting		John F. Clark	July 1965	May 4, 1966	
2		John F. Clark	May 5, 1966	July 1, 1976	
3		Robert S. Cooper	July 1, 1976	June 1, 1979	
Acting		Robert "Ed" Smylie	June 2, 1979	January 31, 1980	
4		A. Thomas Young	February 1, 1980	March 22, 1982	
5		Noel Hinners	June 14, 1982	June 22, 1987	
6		John W. Townsend Jr.	June 22, 1987	June 30, 1990	
7		John M. Klineberg	July 1, 1990	April 29, 1995	
Acting		Joseph H. Rothenberg	April 30, 1995	October 4, 1995	
8		Joseph H. Rothenberg	October 4, 1995	January 12, 1998	
9		Alphonso V. Diaz	January 12, 1998	August 2, 2004	
10		Edward J. Weiler	August 2, 2004	May 6, 2008	
Acting		Arthur F. "Rick" Obenschain	May 7, 2008	August 3, 2008	
11		Robert Strain	August 4, 2008	March 4, 2012	
12		Christopher J. Scolese	March 5, 2012	July 31, 2019	
Acting		George W. Morrow	August 1, 2019	December 31, 2019	
13		Dennis Andrucyk	January 1, 2020	December 31, 2022	
Acting		David Mitchell	January 1, 2023	April 5, 2023	
14		Makenzie Lystrup	April 6, 2023	July 31, 2025	
Acting		Cynthia Simmons	August 1, 2025	June 22, 2026	
15		Jamie Dunn	June 22, 2026	Present	
