= American Rocketry Challenge =

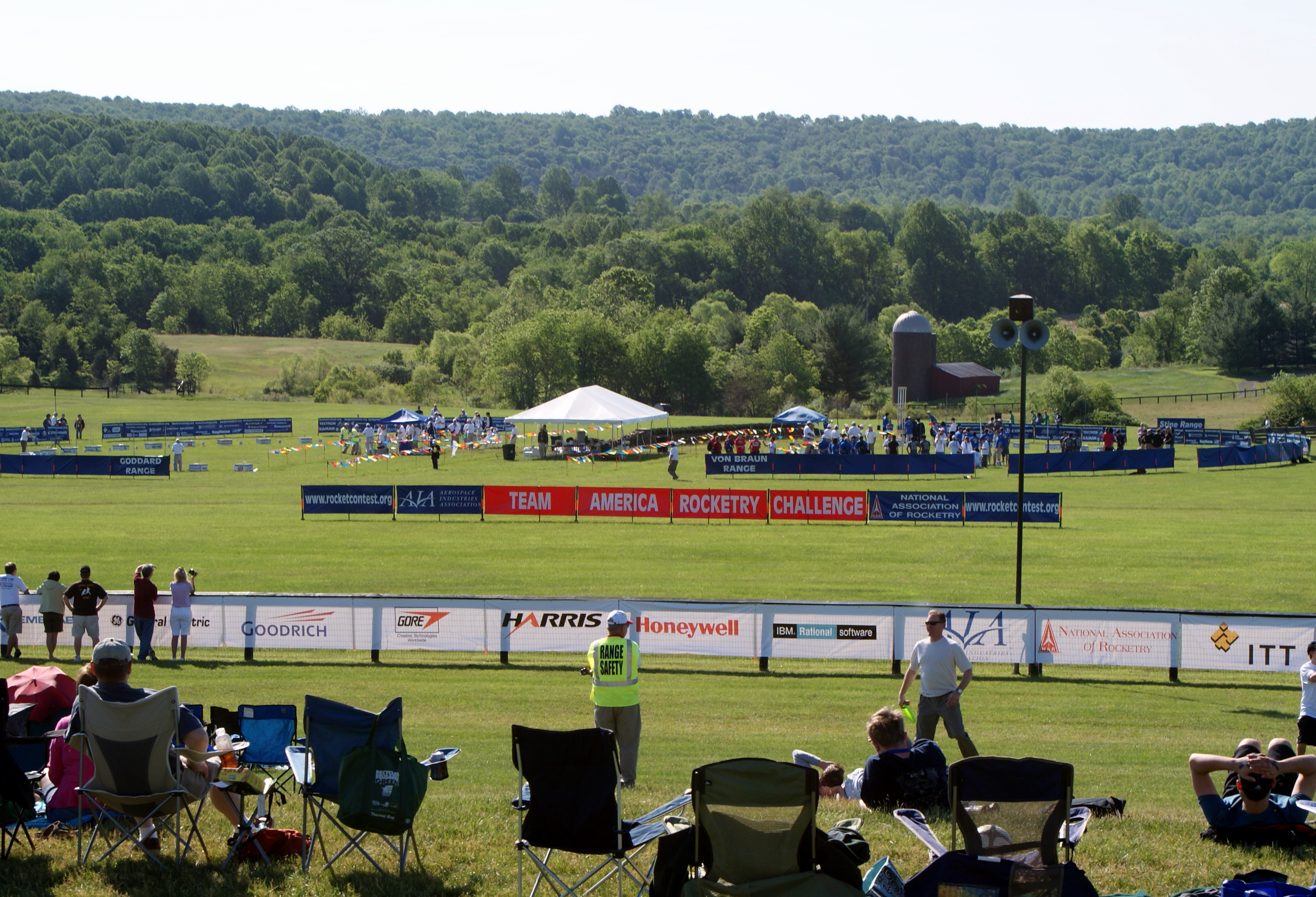
American Rocketry Challenge Finals Range in 2010.

The American Rocketry Challenge is an annual American model rocketry competition for students in grades six to 12 sponsored by the Aerospace Industries Association and the National Association of Rocketry. Co-sponsors include NASA, United States Department of Defense, the American Association of Physics Teachers and the Civil Air Patrol. Previously known as the "Team America Rocketry Challenge," the name was changed following the 2019 event.

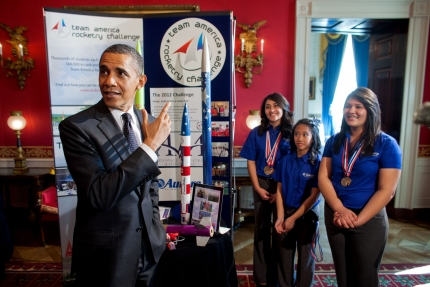
President Obama meets with Team America Rocketry Challenge team members from Presidio, Texas in 2012 White House Science Fair.

The event receives local and national media coverage and usually draws well-known representatives of the Defense Department, NASA, the FAA, and other government agencies. Past National Fly-Offs have been attended by United States Secretary of Defense Robert Gates, Apollo 11 astronaut Buzz Aldrin, Rocket Boys author Homer Hickam, former NASA Administrator Sean O'Keefe, U.S. Senator Mike Enzi, and former NASA Administrator, Charles Bolden.

The 2010, 2011, 2013, 2015, 2016, and 2017 International Fly-Offs were won by the American winners of TARC.

== History ==
The competition began in 2002 celebration of 100th anniversary of the flight, but due to a high level of interest became an annual occurrence. ARC fosters interest in aerospace engineering careers among its participants, and the National Fly-Off in May is an opportunity for corporations, universities, and the armed services to attract students. The program rebranded in 2019 to the American Rocketry Challenge.

== Requirements ==
The requirements for each year's challenge are announced during the summer. Teams generally meet early in the school year, and must make official qualifying flights by early April. A team only has three chances to fly an official qualification attempt; only scores from flights that meet the contest requirements, are safe, and don't break the egg can be submitted. Typically, about 60 percent of participating teams submit at least one qualification score. The teams with the top 100 qualifying scores submitted in April compete in the National Fly-off that is held during May at Great Meadow in The Plains, Virginia.

ARC challenges students to design, build and launch rockets that can safely carry one, two, or three raw hen eggs (depending on the year's challenge) and consistently come very close to a specified flight altitude and duration. Success requires excellent design, workmanship, and altitude prediction, which means students can learn about engineering, aerodynamics, meteorology, and computer simulation through the program. Scores are calculated as deductions from the perfect flight; the lower the score, the better. It's calculated as the sum of distance from the target altitude and four times the "distance" from target duration. Many teams consistently achieve scores less than 10.

== Awards to winning teams ==
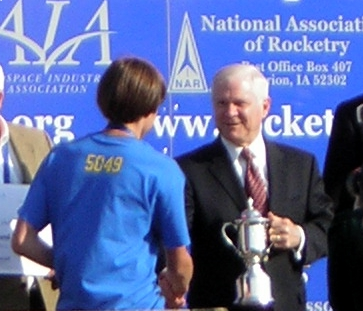
Defense Secretary Robert Gates shaking hands with a 2007 participant

The top 10 teams receive a share of $100,000 in scholarships and prizes, and the top 25 teams are invited to submit a proposal for one of 15 spots in NASA's Student Launch Initiative. There are additional awards sponsored by AIA member corporations in various categories.

Starting in 2008, the winners of the U.S. competition have been awarded a trip to either the Paris Air Show or the Farnborough Airshow, courtesy of Raytheon Company, to compete with the winners from other participating countries. The United Kingdom and France currently have similar competitions and compete in the international fly-offs; organizations from Germany, Canada and Japan are in the initial planning stages for starting their own competition.

== Awards to the program ==
The program has picked up the following awards:

In 2013, Marion C. Blakey, President and CEO of the Aerospace Industries Association, and Susan Lavrakas, AIA’s Director of Workforce, received Aviation Week & Space Technology’s Laureate Award in the workforce category for the association’s outstanding STEM education activities, including the Team America Rocketry Challenge.

In 2014, the National Aeronautic Association named AIA and the National Association of Rocketry (NAR) the 2014 recipients of the Frank G. Brewer Trophy. The award serves to recognize an individual, a group of individuals, or an organization for significant contributions of enduring value to aerospace education in the United States.

In 2015, the National Coalition for Aviation and Space Education (NCASE) selected the Aerospace Industries Association and the National Association of Rocketry to receive its Dr. Mervin K. Strickler Aerospace Education Award, in recognition of their outstanding achievements in the field of aerospace education.

In 2021, the National Aviation Hall of Fame awarded their Spirit of Flight Award to ARC. "The Spirit of Flight Award recognizes organizations that serve a special need of the nation and set high standards by the utilization of aerospace assets. One of the most applicable of the criteria met by the American Rocketry Challenge is the “creativity” that voters of the Spirit of Flight Award are charged to identify."

== Annual Contest Parameters and National Fly-Off Results ==
Contest Year	National Finals Launch Date	Participating Teams	Egg Count/Orientation	Altitude Goal	Duration Goal	Other Contest Parameters	Teams with Qualifying Flights	Finals Cutoff Score	National Finals Winner	Winning score	Winner Result at Int'l	Special Guests	Notes
2002-03	May 10, 2003	873	2	1,500 ft (460 m)	-	Rocket must have two stages.	275		Boonsboro High School, Boonsboro, MD	0		U.S. Senator Mike Enzi, Rocket Boys author Homer Hickam, NASA Administrator Sean O'Keefe	First annual TARC contest.
2003-04	May 15, 2004	610	2	1,250 ft (380 m)	-	Rocket must have two stages.	201		Penn Manor High School, Millersville, PA	0		U.S. Senator Mike Enzi, U.S. Astronauts Jay Apt and Charlie Walker, Estes Founder Vern Estes	Flyover by two USMC F/A-18s
2004-05	May 22, 2005	712	1 or 2	-	60 s	1 or 2 stages; bonus for more complex designs	271		Dakota County 4-H Federation, Farmington, MN	0.1		U.S. Astronaut Jay Apt, NASA Associate Administrator Adeena Loston	Full scale Goddard rocket launch, USMC Presidential Helicopter Squadron flyover
2005-06	May 20, 2006	678	1	800 ft (240 m)	45 s	-	393	21.15	Statesville Christian School, Statesville, NC	1.79		Apollo 11 astronaut Buzz Aldrin, Mars Exploration Rover Scientist Curt Niebur, Director of Defense Research and Engineering John Young, and NASA Associate Administrator Rex Geveden	Flyover by 2 USMC AV-8B Harriers
2006-07	May 19, 2007	691	1	850 ft (260 m)	45 s	-	301	19.25	Newark Memorial High School, Newark, CA	1.86		Secretary of Defense Robert Gates, Apollo 11 astronaut Buzz Aldrin, and Astronaut Jay Apt	F-117 Nighthawk flyover.
2007-08	May 17, 2008	643	2	750 ft (230 m)	45 s (Note: Duration errors are multiplied by two and added to altitude errors to get score)	Contest adopts new two round flyoff. Presentation competition introduced.	341	22.2	Enloe High School (Team 2), Raleigh, NC	(Flight 1) 17.64 (Flight 2) 6.3 (Total) 23.94		AIA President Marion Blakey, United States Secretary of the Air Force Michael Wynne	B-2 Spirit flyover.
2008-09	May 16, 2009	653	1 (sideways)	750 ft (230 m)	45 s		382	17.6	Madison West High School (Team 3), Madison, WI	(Flight 1) 11.94 (Flight 2) 8.6 (Total) 20.54		AIA President Marion Blakey, United States Secretary of the Air Force Michael B. Donley	Flyover by T-38s.
2009-10	May 15, 2010	669	1	825 ft (251 m)	45 s	Streamer recovery for egg.	335	29.5	Penn Manor High School (Team 1), Millersville, PA	(Flight 1) 3 (Flight 2) 23.32 (Total) 26.32		United States Secretary of the Air Force Michael B. Donley, Director of Defense Research and Engineering Zachary Lemnios, Textron CEO Scott Donnelly, Duff Goldman of Ace of Cakes.	Flyover by USAF Heritage Flight: P-51 Mustang, F-16 Falcon, and F-22 Raptor. High Power Rocket with Ace of Cakes payload.
2010-11	May 15, 2011	607	1	750 ft (230 m)	40-45 s (Note: Duration errors are multiplied by three and added to altitude errors to get score)	Portion of Rocket containing egg must return with 15in (38 cm) parachute.	318	15.87	Rockwall-Heath High School (Team 1), Heath, TX	(Flight 1) 14 (Flight 2) 2 (Total) 16		AIA President Marion Blakey	
2011-12	May 12, 2012	678	2	800 ft (240 m)	43-47 s	Starting now, rockets limited to 650 grams total liftoff weight; motors limited to a single stage 80 N·s (F impulse).	409	13.2.	Madison West High School (Team 1), Madison, WI	(Flight 1) 10 (Flight 2) 2 (Total) 12		AIA President Marion Blakey, FAA Associate Administrator for Aviation Safety Margaret Gilligan, Assistant Secretary of Defense for Research and Engineering Zachary J. Lemnios, Kaman Corporation Chairman, President & Chief Executive Officer Neal J. Keating.	
2012-13	May 11, 2013	735	1 (sideways)	750 ft (230 m)	48-50 s (Note: Duration errors are multiplied by four and added to altitude errors to get score)	Portion of Rocket containing egg must return with 15in (38 cm) parachute. External diameter of rocket must be no less than 60 mm.	470	16.12	Georgetown 4H, Georgetown, TX	(Flight 1) 5.36 (Flight 2) 23.88 (Total) 29.24		AIA President Marion Blakey, NASA Administrator Charles Bolden	
2013-14	May 10, 2014	707	2	825 ft (251 m)	48-50 s	Starting now, best two of three scores summed to determine Finals qualifiers. Rocket must descend with all pieces tethered to two parachutes of the same size.	413	54.12	Creekview High School (Team 1), Canton, GA	(Flight 1) 6 (Flight 2) 8.88 (Total) 14.88		AIA President Marion Blakey, Chief Scientist of the United States Air Force Dr. Mica Endsley	
2014-15	May 9, 2015	685	1	800 ft (240 m)	46-48 s	Starting now, rocket minimum length is 650 mm. Payload must descend separately with a single parachute. Second flight altitude goal at finals is 775 ft (236 m).		40	Russellville City School, Russellville, AL	16.16		CEO Aurora Flight Sciences John Langford, USAF Major General Martin Whelen, NASA Orion Program Executive Garth Henning, Lockheed Martin Vice President, Space & Missile Defense Programs Eric Thoemmes, Raytheon Vice President U.S. Business Development	
2015-16	May 14, 2016		2 (1 axial, 1 sideways)	850 ft (260 m)	44-46 s	Rocket recovers as 1 piece with a single recovery device of the team's choosing. Second flight altitude goal at finals is 825 ft (251 m); the duration goal is 43-45 s.			Odle Middle School, Bellevue WA	13.64	1		
2016-17	May 13, 2017	812	1	775 ft (236 m)	41-43 s	Must use body tubes of two different diameters. The smaller-diameter of the two must be used for the lower (motor and fin) end of the rocket and must not be greater than 42 mm. First flight altitude goal at finals is 775 ft (236 m); the duration goal is 41-43 s.	489	31.17	Festus High School, Festus MO	13.84	1 (USA, JPN, FRA, UK)	Brigadier General B. Chance “Salty” Saltzman, the Director of Future Operations, Deputy Chief of Staff for Operations of the U.S. Air Force, Rick Hunt, VADM (Ret.) Raytheon Vice President U.S. Business Development, Dave Machuga, Director and General Manager of Digital Receiver Technology, and William Van Order, LM Fellow at Lockheed Martin Enterprise Business Services.	
2017-18	May 12, 2018		2	800 ft (244 m)	41-43 s	Two body sections (BT-70 upper for eggs, BT-80 lower), recovering as one piece. Finals flight targets: Flight 1 800 ft in 41-43 s, then Flight 2 (either 775 ft in 40-42 s or 825 ft, in 42-44 s) by coin toss.			Creekview High School, Canton GA	21.2	1 (USA, FRA, JPN, UK)		
2018-19	May 18, 2019		3	856 ft (261 m)	43-46 s	Egg capsule recovers separately under at least 2 same-shape parachutes (of diameters no more than 2 in difference) from booster section. Finals includes separate non-scoring contest for which rocket most closely resembles the Saturn V. Finals flight targets: Flight 1 856 ft in 43-46 s, then Flight 2 (either 831 ft in 42-45 s or 881 ft, in 44-47 s) by coin toss.			Madison West High School (Team 2), Madison WI	10	2 (UK, USA, FRA/JPN tie)		Apollo 11 50th Anniversary competition. 856 ft because Armstrong set foot on the Moon at 8:56pm Houston time.
2019-20	May 16, 2020		1	800 ft (244 m)	40-43 s	Finals flight targets: 775 ft in 39-42 s and 825 ft in 41-44 s.			NONE- National Final Fly-Off postponed	None			COVID-19 lockdowns impacted most teams' ability to gather, build, and attempt qualifying flights, leading to cancelation of the Finals.
2020-21	See Notes		1	800 ft (244 m)	40-43 s	Finals flight targets: 810 ft in 40-43 s and 860 ft in 42-45 s.			Oregon Episcopal School, Portland OR	7.7			VIRTUAL FINALS: Birmingham, AL – June 12; Brighton, WI – June 12; Dayton, OH – June 12 & 13; Lucerne Valley, CA – June 11 & 13; Palm Beach, FL – June 12 & 13; Pasco, WA – June 13; Pueblo, CO – June 19; Reno, NV – June 12; Rockdale, TX – June 12; Syracuse, NY – June 12; The Plains, VA – June 12 & 13
2021-22	May 14, 2022	724	2 (sideways)	835 ft (254 m)	41-44 s	Body tubes of 2 different diameters, each no less than 6" long, recovering as one piece. Finals flight targets: 810 ft in 40-43 s and 860 ft in 42-45 s.		47.58	Newport High School - Team 2, Bellevue WA	13	2 (JPN, USA, FRA, UK)		
2022-23	May 20, 2023	798	1	850 ft (259 m)	42-45 s	Rocket recovers as two pieces (egg and altimeter in one, motor in the other), both under parachute. Finals flight targets: 825 ft in 41-44 s and 875 ft in 43-46 s.		35	Hardin Valley Academy Team 1, Knoxville TN	13.4	4 (UK, FRA, JPN, USA)	Astronaut Warren "Woody" Hoburg (addressed teams while aboard the International Space Station)	
2023-24	May 19, 2024	922	1	820 ft (250 m)	43-46 s	Starting now, Finals flights must finish in the same time range as qualifying flights. Rocket recovers as one piece. Finals flight targets: 800 ft in and 850 ft.		32.12	Tharptown High School, Russellville AL	4 (3 + 1)	2 (UK, USA, JPN, FRA)	Astronaut Warren "Woody" Hoburg	Jolly Logic Altimeter One and Altimeter Two added to approved altimeter list; PerfectFlite APRA dropped. Finals were delayed to Sunday due to weather for the first time.
2024-25	May 17, 2025	1001	2 (sideways)	790 ft (241 m)	41-44 s	Rockets recover as 2 pieces. Finals flight targets: 765 ft and 815 ft.		28.6	Boy Scout Troop 74, Montville NJ	31.84 (16 + 15.84)	1 (USA, UK, FRA, JPN)		
2025-26	May 16, 2026	1107	1 (axial)	750 ft (228.6 m)	36-39 s	Rocket airframe is 1 size (min. 47 mm / 1.85" diameter) and recovers as 1 piece. Two Finals flight targets are somewhere between 725 ft and 775 ft, to be announced at Finals Pre-flight Meeting.		23.28	The Bishop School, La Jolla, CA	11 (8+3)		NASA Administrator Jared Isaacman	
2026-27	May 15, 2027		2 (any)	800 ft (243.8 m)	37-40 s	Airframe: 2 tubes, one of which is 12"+ of BT-80 (66 mm diameter), other must be at least +/- 10 mm different diameter; recovers as 1 piece using 1 or more parachutes; Finals altitude target 775-825 ft.							AeroTech 24/40 RMS AP reload motors and Estes 24mm E12 motors removed from Approved Motors List
