= Victor H. Reis =

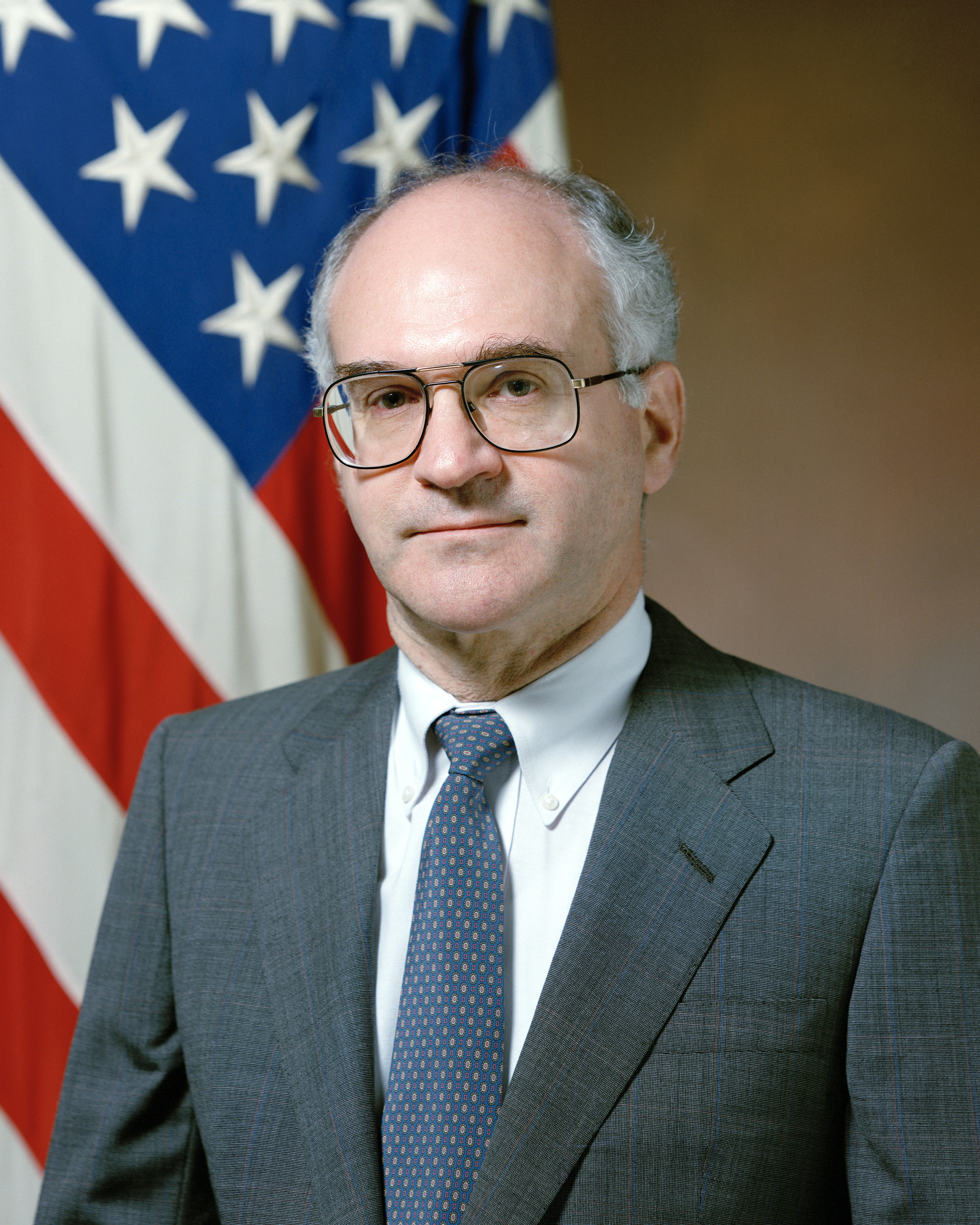
- Dr. Victor H. Reis in April 1990
- Born: Victor Herbert Reis; February 11, 1935 (age 91); New York City, U.S.
- Education: Brooklyn Technical High School; Rensselaer Polytechnic Institute (BS); Yale University (MS); Princeton University (PhD)
- Occupations: Technologist; former U.S. government official
- Political party: Republican

Victor Herbert Reis (born February 11, 1935) is a technologist and former U.S. government official, best known as the architect and original sponsor of the U.S. nuclear Stockpile Stewardship Program and its associated Accelerated Strategic Computing Initiative (ASCI), which resulted in the creation of several new generations of government-sponsored supercomputers.

== Early life and education ==
Born in New York City and raised in Jackson Heights, Queens, Reis attended Brooklyn Technical High School and graduated in 1953. He participated in Army ROTC at Rensselaer Polytechnic Institute and received a B.S. degree in mechanical engineering in 1957. Reis earned an M.S. degree in mechanical engineering at Yale University in 1958 and a Ph.D. in mechanical engineering from Princeton University in 1962. His doctoral thesis was entitled Free expansion of pure and mixed gases from small sonic nozzles.

== Career ==
Reis was called to active duty in the Army after completing his doctorate and assigned to the NASA Ames Research Center as a research scientist supporting the Apollo program until 1965. After completing his active duty commitment, he worked at the General Motors Defense Research Laboratories and the Avco-Everett Research Laboratory. From 1973 to 1981, Reis was a technical staff member at MIT's Lincoln Laboratory.

Reis was Assistant Director for National Security and Space in the Office of Science and Technology Policy in the Executive Office of the President, 1981–1983. Leaving government, he became senior vice president for strategic planning at the Science Applications International Corp., 1983–1989. He returned briefly to Lincoln Laboratory in 1989 as special assistant to the director, then returned to government as, first, Deputy Director of the Defense Advanced Research Projects Agency (DARPA), 1989–1990; then that agency's Director, 1990–1991; and subsequently Director of Defense Research and Engineering at the U.S. Department of Defense, where he succeeded Charles M. Herzfeld and served until 1993, when he was succeeded by Anita K. Jones.

Reis served as Assistant Secretary for Defense Programs in the U.S. Department of Energy from 1993 to 1999, where he led the development of the DOE's Stockpile Stewardship Program, which was formally established by the 1994 National Defense Authorization Act (Public Law 103-160). After the U.S. moratorium on nuclear testing in 1992, Reis was among the first to recognize the need for a new, formal program in maintaining the U.S. nuclear stockpile, replacing data formerly obtained by testing with data from supercomputer simulation and small-scale non-nuclear experiments. The Stockpile Stewardship Program, and its associated initiatives in supercomputing, modeling, and simulation, led to the creation of several new generations of supercomputers.

From 1999 to 2005, Reis was senior vice president of Hicks & Associates, Inc. In 2005, he became senior advisor in the Office of the Secretary, Department of Energy. Reis was also a member of the Strategic Advisory Group of the U.S. Strategic Command. He retired in March 2017.

In 2020, Reis, along with over 130 other former Republican national security officials, signed a statement that asserted that President Trump was unfit to serve another term, and "To that end, we are firmly convinced that it is in the best interest of our nation that Vice President Joe Biden be elected as the next President of the United States, and we will vote for him."

Reis' awards include two Department of Defense Distinguished Public Service Medals.

== See also ==
- Advanced Simulation and Computing Program
- Nuclear weapons testing
