= Ed Smylie =

American engineer (1929–2025)

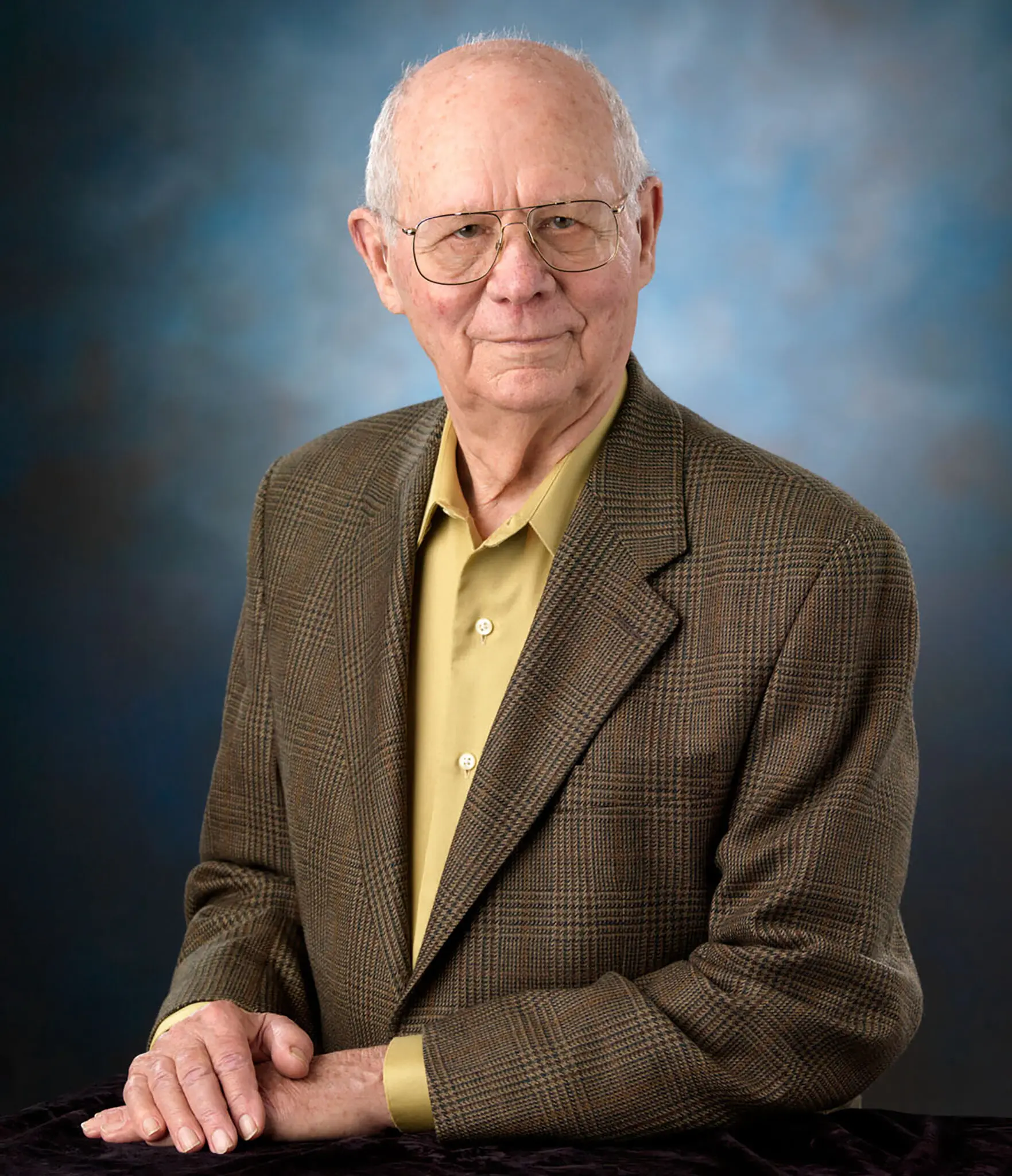
- Born: Robert Edwin Smylie; December 25, 1929; Lincoln County, Mississippi, U.S.
- Died: April 21, 2025 (aged 95); Crossville, Tennessee, U.S.
- Education: Mississippi State University
- Awards: Presidential Medal of Freedom

Robert Edwin Smylie (December 25, 1929 – April 21, 2025) was an American engineer and NASA official. In 1970, he oversaw NASA's Crew Systems Division and led the team of engineers that saved the crew of Apollo 13. In 2014, Time magazine called Smylie "an improvisational genius".

== Early life ==
Ed Smylie was born on his grandfather’s farm in Lincoln County, Mississippi. He graduated from Mississippi State University in 1952 with a bachelor’s degree in mechanical engineering, served in the Navy, and then returned to the university for a master’s degree in the same field. He worked for Douglas Aircraft on the DC-8 before joining NASA in 1962.

== NASA and Apollo 13 ==
In April 1970, during the infamous Apollo 13 mission, when an oxygen tank exploded and disabled the main module, he and a team of engineers used duct tape as the solution to the lunar module’s scrubbing system, which was starting to lose capacity to provide breathable air for the astronauts.

The mission operations team was awarded the Presidential Medal of Freedom by President Richard Nixon, who named Smylie and his deputy, James Correale, in his remarks.

Smylie later worked at NASA headquarters in Washington and served as the deputy director of the Goddard Space Flight Center in Maryland under Robert S. Cooper from June 2, 1979 to January 31, 1980, when he was succeeded by A. Thomas Young.

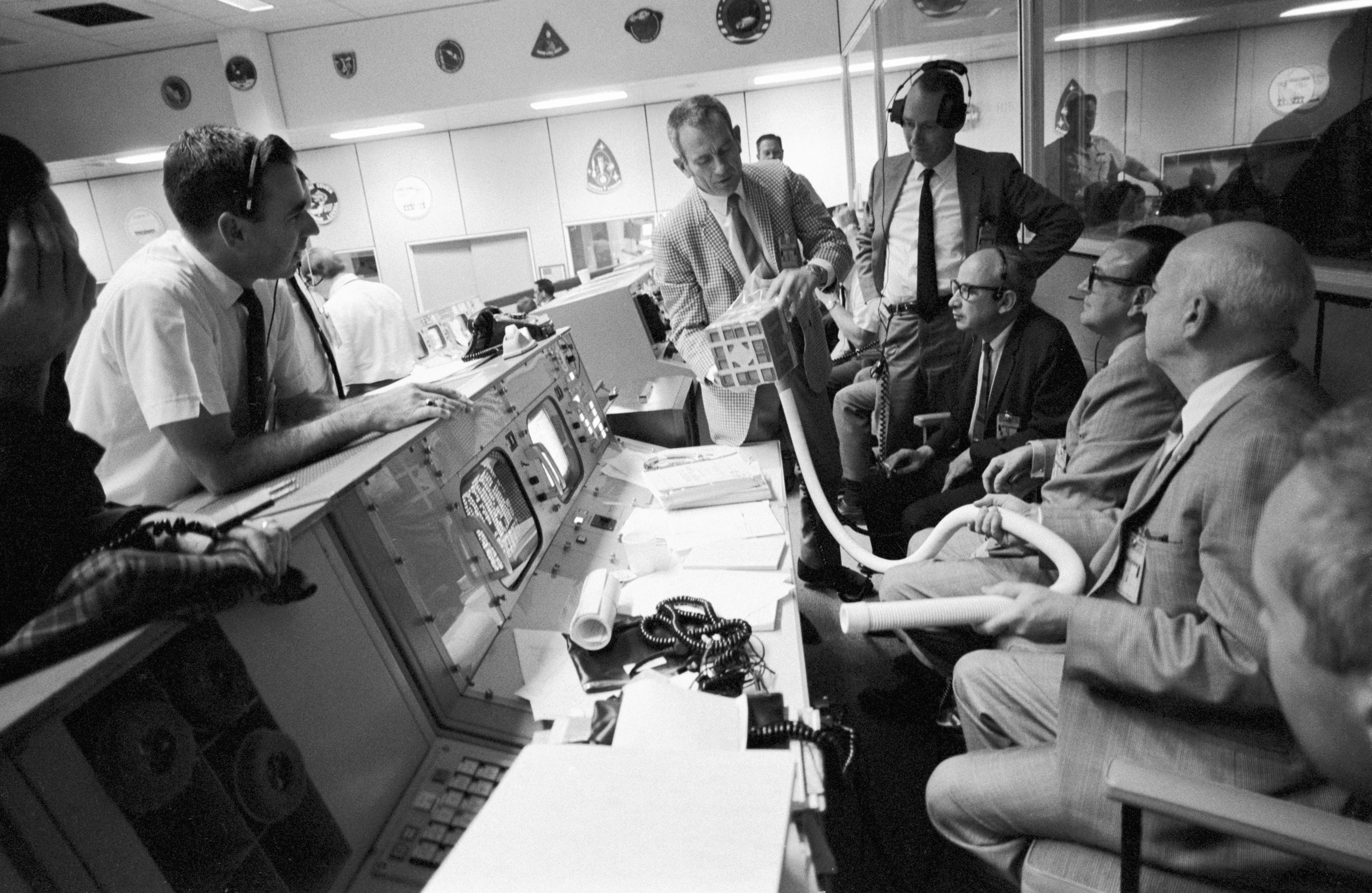
Deke Slayton (checked jacket) shows the adapter devised by Smylie to make use of square Command Module lithium hydroxide canisters to remove excess carbon dioxide from the Apollo 13 Lunar Module cabin.

== Post-NASA ==
After retiring from the agency in 1983, he held executive positions at RCA, the Mitre Corporation, and the Grumman Corporation. He died on April 21, 2025, at the age of 95.
