= Charles M. Herzfeld =

Austrian-American scientist (1925–2017)

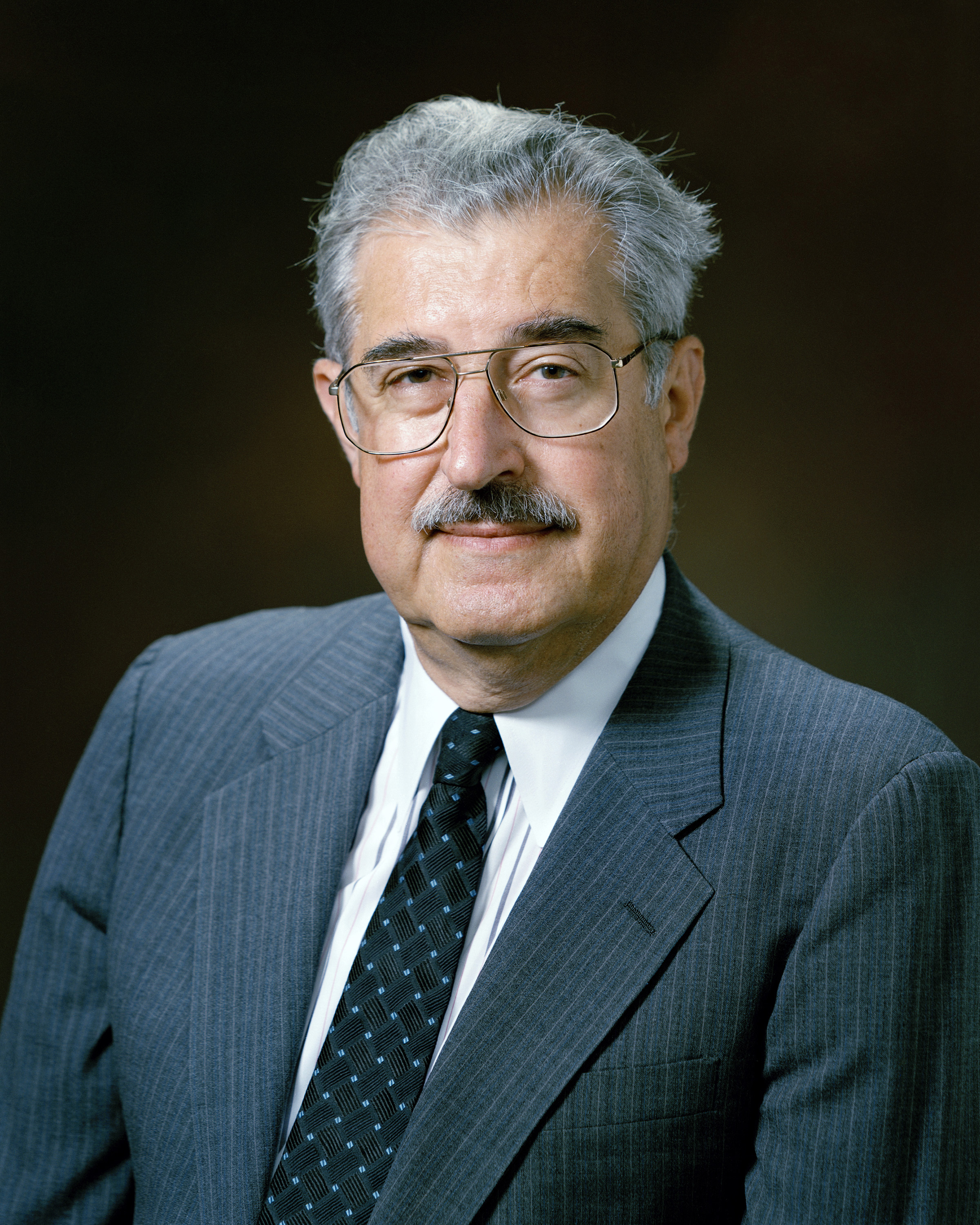
- Herzfeld in 1990

5th Director of DARPA
- In office June 1965 – March 1967

Personal details
- Born: Charles Maria Herzfeld; June 29, 1925 Vienna, Austria
- Died: February 23, 2017 (aged 91) Silver Spring, Maryland, U.S.
- Education: Catholic University of America (B.S.); University of Chicago (PhD)

Charles Maria Herzfeld (June 29, 1925 – February 23, 2017) was an Austrian-born American scientist and scientific manager, particularly for the US Government. He is best known for his time as Director of DARPA, during which, among other things, he personally made the decision to authorize the creation of the ARPANET, the predecessor of the Internet.

== Biography ==
Herzfeld was born in Vienna, Austria. He is the nephew of Karl Ferdinand Herzfeld, the accomplished physical chemist (brother of his father, August). After the Nazi takeover of Austria, since they were Catholic Monarchists, he and his mother fled Austria, criss-crossing Europe and two years later emigrated to the United States; he became an American citizen in the late 1940s.

He received a BS degree in chemical engineering from the Catholic University of America in Washington, D.C. (1945) and a PhD degree in physical chemistry from the University of Chicago (1951). While at Chicago, he attended a lecture by John von Neumann about von Neumann's early work on computers, a lecture which had a profound influence on him.

He first worked as a physicist; from 1951 to 1953 in the United States Army at the Ballistic Research Laboratory in Aberdeen, Maryland, and from 1953 to 1955 as a civilian employee at the Naval Research Laboratory in Washington, D.C. He then spent several years with the National Bureau of Standards.

== Later career ==
He moved to DARPA (or ARPA as it was called at that point) on September 29, 1961, to coordinate the Project Defender program, an early ballistic missile defense program.

One early experience at DARPA would leave a lasting impact on him: a lecture by the noted computer scientist J. C. R. Licklider, which converted him to Licklider's vision of computers as general information accessories; during his time at DARPA, Herzfeld would do much to set Licklider's vision on the road to achievement.

Herzfeld would stay at DARPA until 1967, directing the Ballistic Missile Defense Program from 1961 to 1963, then moving on to serve as assistant director from 1963 to 1965, and as director from June, 1965 to March, 1967.

After leaving ARPA, he worked for a number of different companies, including the ITT Corporation (as vice president and director of research and technology) from 1967 to 1985, and as vice chairman of Aetna, Jacobs, and Ramo Technology Ventures, a high-technology venture capital group, from 1985 until 1990.

He returned to the government in 1990, serving as Director of Defense Research and Engineering from March 12, 1990, to May 18, 1991. He chaired the Nuclear Weapons Council and the Intelligence R&D Council.

He was also a member of the Chief of Naval Operations Executive Panel (since its formation in 1970), the National Commission on Space (to which he was appointed in 1985), the Defense Science Board, the Defense Policy Board and the President's Information Advisory Council (PITAC) National Security Panel, among numerous other government advisory activities.

== Memberships ==
He was a member of the Council of Foreign Relations and the International Institute for Strategic Studies in London. He was also a fellow of the American Physical Society (elected in 1958), and of the American Association for the Advancement of Science. He was also a member of the Cosmos Club (in Washington D.C.), and of the Explorers Club (in New York).

In 2012, Herzfeld was inducted into the Internet Hall of Fame by the Internet Society.

Government offices
Preceded by Robert L. Sproull	Director of ARPA; 1965–1967	Succeeded by Eberhardt Rechtin
Preceded by Robert C. Duncan	Director of Defense Research and Engineering; 1990–1991	Succeeded by Victor H. Reis
