= Zachary J. Lemnios =

American scientist

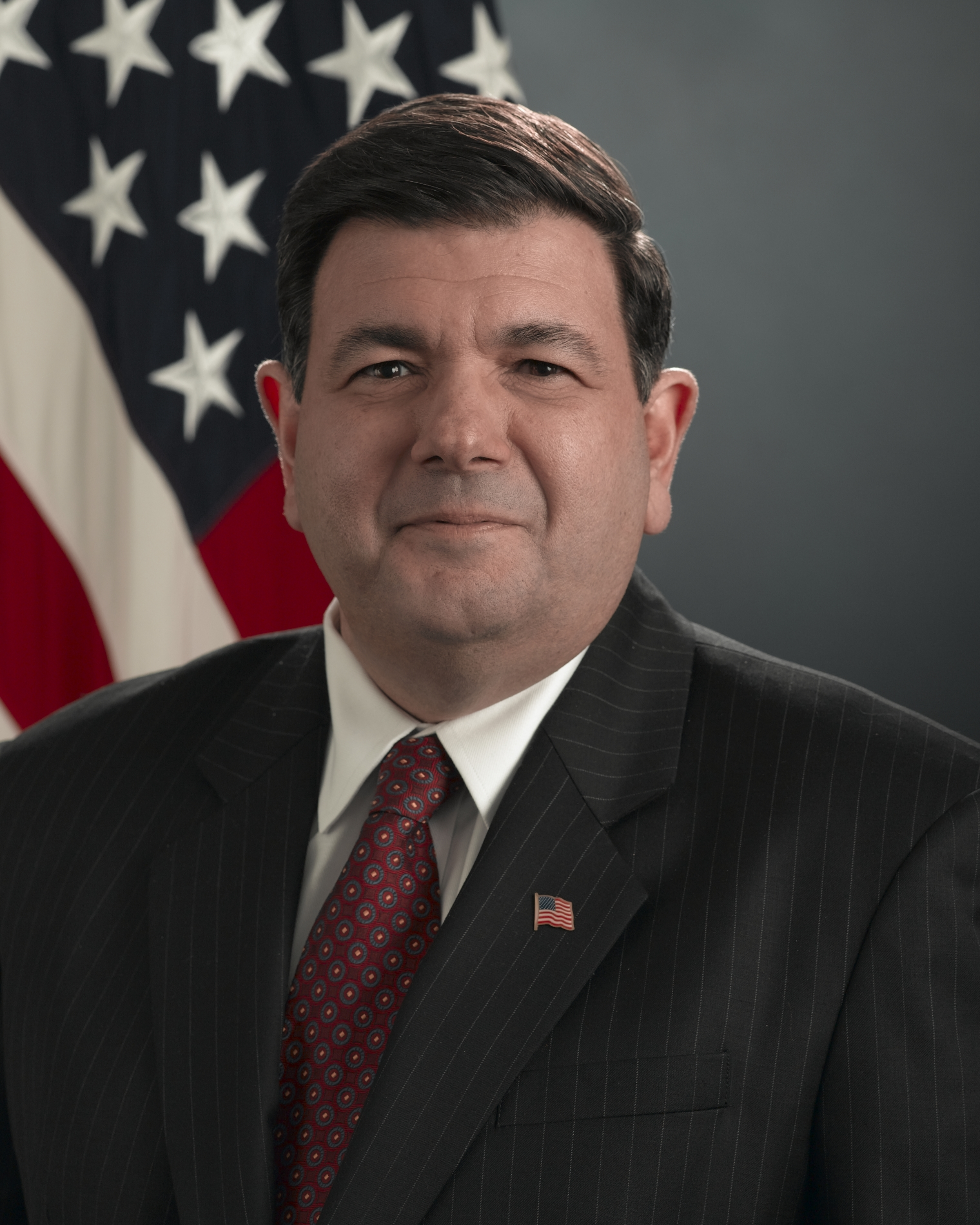
- Official portrait

Assistant Secretary of Defense for Research and Engineering
- In office July 2, 2009 – November 30, 2012
- President: Barack Obama
- Preceded by: John J. Young, Jr.
- Succeeded by: Stephen P. Welby (2015)

Personal details
- Born: February 21, 1955 (age 71) Cambridge, Massachusetts
- Party: Democratic
- Spouse: Stephanie Bicoulis
- Children: 4
- Education: University of Michigan (BSEE); Washington University in St. Louis (MSEE)

Zachary John Lemnios (born February 21, 1955) is an American scientist, executive, and engineer who has worked in government, industry, and academia. Most notably, he held the post of Assistant Secretary of Defense for Research and Engineering (currently known as Under Secretary of Defense for Research and Engineering) from 2009 to 2012, and he has served as the first Chief Technology Officer of MIT Lincoln Laboratory, and as Vice President of Research at IBM. Lemnios later founded ZJL Consulting, LLC.

== Early life ==
Zachary Lemnios was born on February 21, 1955, in Cambridge, Massachusetts, and he was raised in Lexington, Massachusetts. He attended the Lexington public schools and graduated from Lexington High School. He was an avid amateur radio operator (WA1LTA) and enjoyed building electronic projects.

== Education ==
Lemnios received his Bachelor of Science in Electrical Engineering (BSEE) from the University of Michigan in 1976 and his Master of Science in Electrical Engineering (MSEE) from the McKelvey School of Engineering at Washington University in St. Louis in 1979. His thesis was titled, "The Fabrication and Evaluation of Microwave Field Effect Transistors". He also completed post graduate courses, including the Harvard Kennedy School of Government Program for Senior Executives in National and International Security (NIS).

== Career ==
Lemnios held technical and leadership positions across industry at Hughes Aircraft, Westinghouse Electric, and Ford Microelectronics that led to the development of advanced microelectronic components.

Lemnios served as the first Chief Technology Officer of MIT Lincoln Laboratory. He joined the Information Processing Technology Office (IPTO) in April 2002, and was influential in the creation of the Personalized Assistant that Learns program.

Lemnios has served as chair and on the Technical Program Committee of GOMACTech and GaAs IC Symposium.

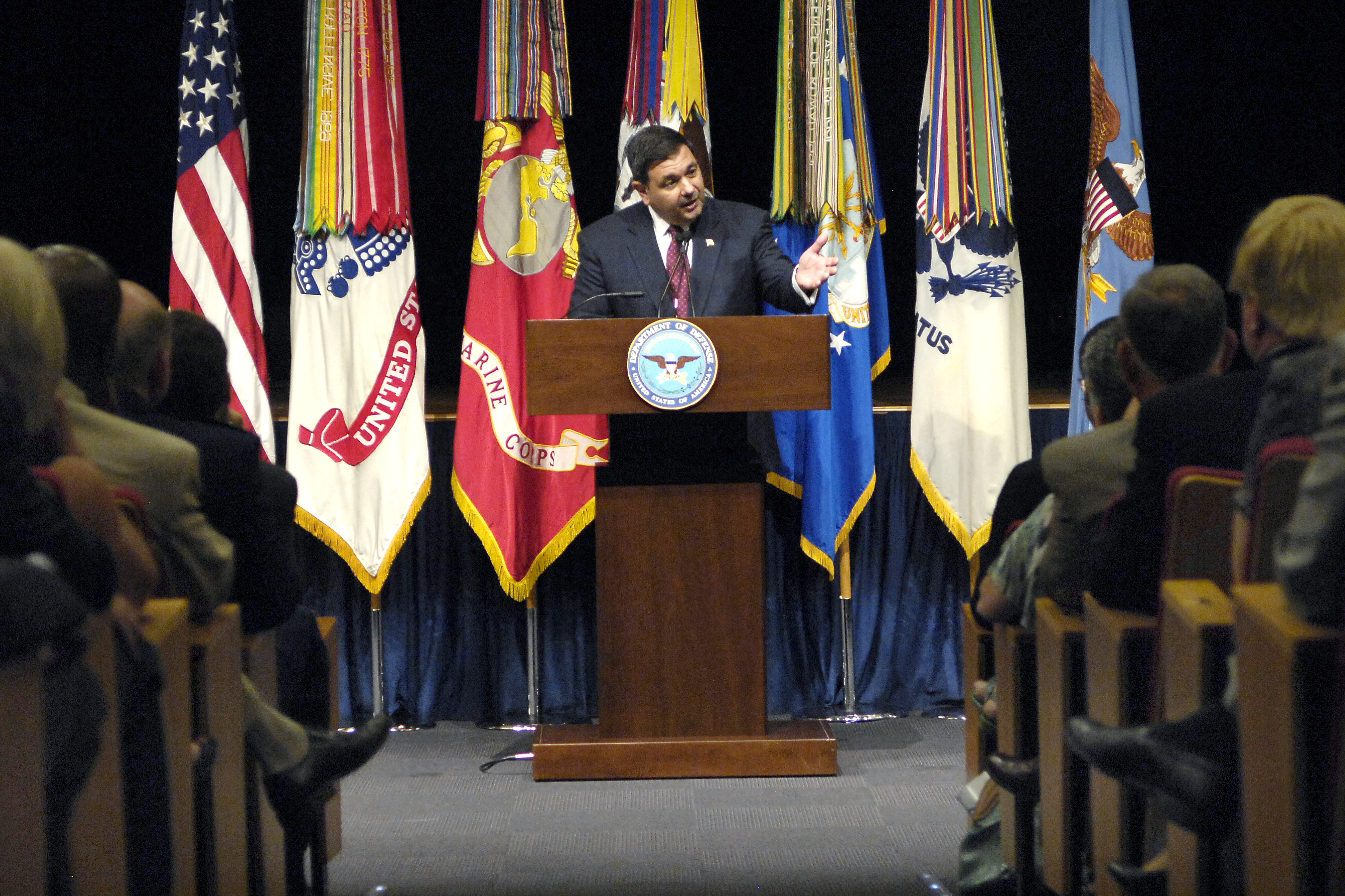
Lemnios addresses the audience during a welcoming ceremony hosted by Defense Secretary Robert M. Gates for three newly appointed officials, including Lemnios, at the Pentagon, c. August 10, 2009

Lemnios was confirmed as Assistant Secretary of Defense for Research and Engineering by the Senate on June 19, 2009, and he was sworn in on July 2, 2009. In this position, Lemnios was the Chief Technology Officer for Department of Defense.

Lemnios established the DoD Science and Technology Executive Committee.

Lemnios served as a Principal member, Committee on Technology of the National Science and Technology Council; Advisor, Defense Acquisition Board; Chairman, Radiation Hardened Oversight Council (RHOC); Chairman, Defense Science and Technology Advisory Group (DSTAG); Chairman, Armed Services Biomedical Research Evaluation and Management Committee; Chairman, DoD Combat Feeding Research and Engineering Board (CFREB); and chairman, DoD Biometrics Executive Committee.

He launched four imperatives for the Defense Science & Technology enterprise, which set the framework for how the Department of Defense prepares for future US national security needs:

- "Accelerate the delivery of technical capabilities to win the current fight and develop the skills and processes to rapidly field capabilities in any future fight".
- "Prepare for an uncertain future" by investing in key technologies such as cyber science and technology, electronic warfare and protection, data-to-decisions (to reduce cycle time and manpower for analysis), engineered resilient systems (for protection against infiltration and to develop agile manufacturing for trusted defense systems), countering WMDs, autonomous systems, and enhancing human systems (human-machine interfaces).
- "Reduce the cost, acquisition time, and risk of major defense acquisition programs".
- "Develop world class science, technology, engineering, and math capabilities for the DoD and the Nation".

Lemnios announced his resignation on November 20, 2012. He left the Pentagon and joined IBM where he served as Vice President for research strategy.

=== Awards ===
Lemnios has authored more than 40 papers and holds 4 patents in advanced Gallium arsenide device and MMIC technology.

Lemnios is a Life Fellow of the Institute of Electrical and Electronics Engineers.

In 2018, Lemnios received the University of Michigan Electrical and Computer Engineering Alumni Impact Award for "helping to shape the new Frontier in Electrical Engineering and Computer Science", the highest recognition granted by ECE to its alumni.

Lemnios received the Washington University in St. Louis Alumni Achievement Award.

=== Patents ===
- Three Metal Personalization Of Application Specific Monolithic Microwave Integrated Circuit
- Three Metal Personalization Of Application Specific Monolithic Microwave Integrated Circuit
- Sputtered Metallic Silicide Gate For GaAs Integrated Circuits
- Ion Implant Mask And Cap For Gallium Arsenide Structures

== Personal life ==
He was selected by the Department of Defense to be one of the USA Science and Engineering Festival's Nifty Fifty Speakers to speak about his work and career to middle and high school students in October 2010.

Lemnios was a special guest at the Team America Rocketry Challenge in 2010, delivered remarks to young students at the Real World Design Challenge in 2012, and was a special guest at the FIRST Robotics Competition in 2012.

Government offices
Preceded by John J. Young, Jr.	Assistant Secretary of Defense for Research and Engineering; 2009 – 2012	Succeeded by Stephen P. Welby
