= Robert C. Duncan (engineer) =

American engineer and engineering manager

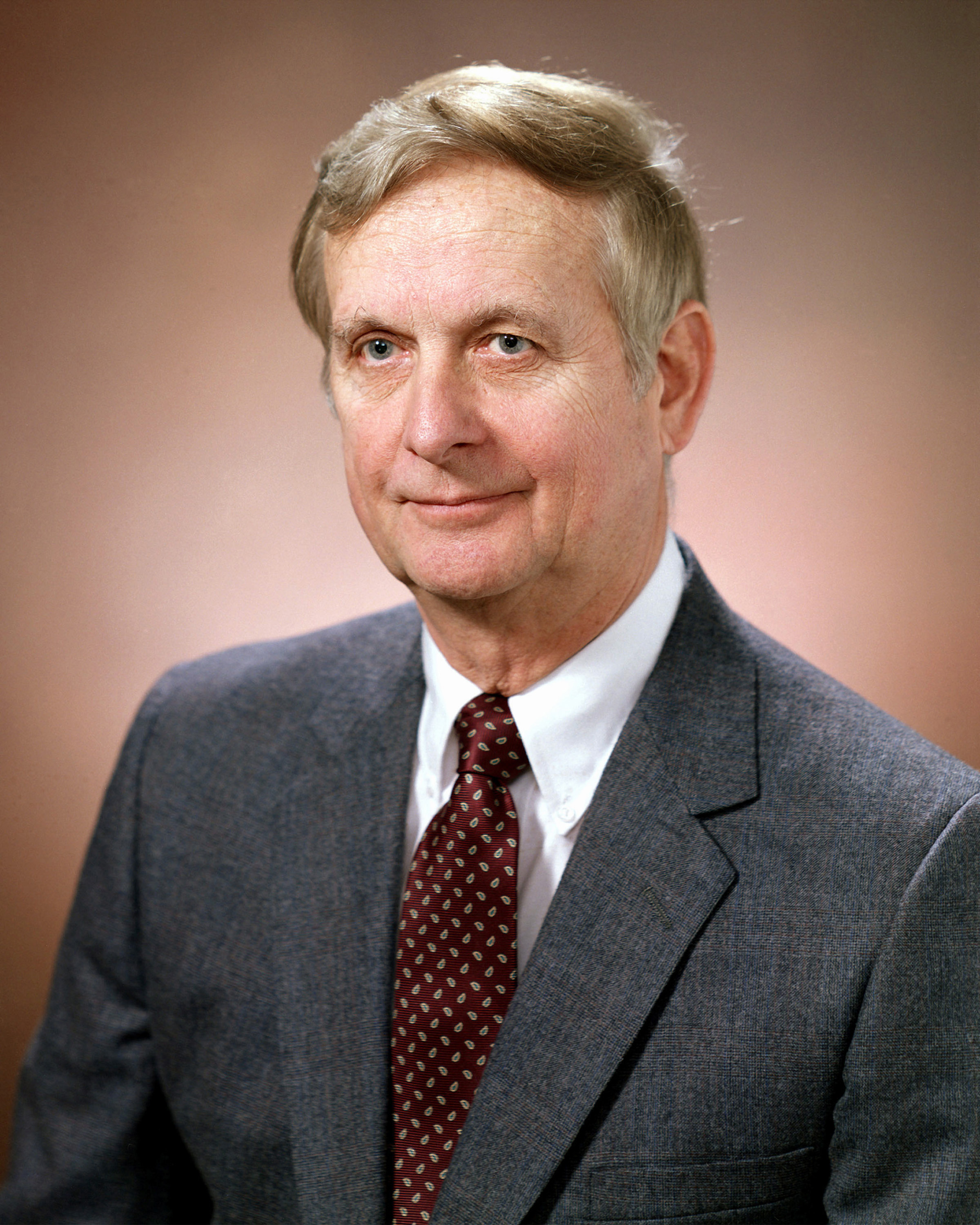
- Duncan in 1985

Director of Defense Research and Engineering
- In office December 17, 1987 – November 30, 1989
- President: Ronald Reagan; George H. W. Bush
- Preceded by: Donald A. Hicks
- Succeeded by: Charles M. Herzfeld

11th Director of DARPA
- In office 1985–1988
- Preceded by: Robert S. Cooper
- Succeeded by: Ray S. Colladay

Personal details
- Born: Robert Clifton Duncan; November 21, 1923 Jonesville, Virginia, U.S.
- Died: May 17, 2003 (aged 79) Altadena, California, U.S.
- Resting place: Arlington National Cemetery, Arlington County, Virginia, U.S.
- Spouse: Rosemary Fleming (m. 1949)
- Children: 4
- Education: United States Naval Academy (BS); Naval Postgraduate School (BS); Massachusetts Institute of Technology (MS, ScD)
- Occupation: Engineer, engineering manager

Military service
- Allegiance: United States
- Branch/service: United States Navy
- Years of service: 1945–1965
- Rank: Commander

Robert Clifton "Cliff" Duncan (November 21, 1923 – May 17, 2003) was an American engineer and engineering manager, particularly for the US Government. He is best known for two of the programs he directed to successful completion - guidance and control for Apollo program, and the Polaroid SX-70 camera.

== Biography ==
Born in Jonesville, Virginia, and raised in Xenia, Ohio, Duncan received an appointment to the United States Naval Academy Class of 1946. He received BS degrees from the Naval Academy (1945) and the Naval Postgraduate School (1953), and MS and ScD degrees in aeronautical engineering from the Massachusetts Institute of Technology. His 1954 master's thesis was entitled Fundamental design principles of an attack simulator for airborne fire control systems. His 1960 doctoral thesis was entitled Guidance parameters and constraints for controlled atmospheric entry.

Duncan served in the United States Navy from 1945 to 1965. In the closing months of World War II, he was assigned to the heavy cruiser Bremerton but did not see combat. Duncan was next trained as a pilot, and flew both fighters and heavy attack bombers. On the completion of his flight duties in 1960, he had attained the rank of lieutenant commander. He served in the Pentagon from 1960 to 1964, first as chief of space programs for the Chief of Naval Operations, and next as staff assistant director for research and engineering.

When he retired from the Navy in 1965 as a commander, he had been assigned to NASA in Houston, Texas, at the Manned Spacecraft Center (now the Lyndon B. Johnson Space Center). During his three years there he was chief of the Guidance and Control Division. After that, he spent a year back in Cambridge, Massachusetts, as assistant director of the Electronics Research Center.

Duncan left the government in 1968 to work for the Polaroid Corporation, where he first served as program manager of the SX-70 camera, with responsibilities for its design, engineering, and production. In 1975, Duncan was elected vice president of engineering.

He returned to government employment from 1985 to 1993. His first position was as Director of the Defense Advanced Research Projects Agency; a year later, was confirmed in a dual capacity, becoming simultaneously Director of Defense Research and Engineering. His final role in the Pentagon was a four-year tour as Director of Operational Test and Evaluation, where he was principal advisor to both the Secretary of Defense and the Under-Secretary of Defense for Acquisitions.

He retired from the government in 1993, and became a vice president at Hicks and Associates (a national security consultanting firm).

== Memberships and awards ==
He was a member of the National Academy of Engineering.

His awards include the Legion of Merit (1964), the NASA Exceptional Service Medal (1968), and the U.S. Department of Defense Distinguished Public Service Award (1987 and 1989).

He was an Eagle Scout and was honored in 1984 with the Distinguished Eagle Scout Award.

== Personal ==
Duncan married Rosemary Fleming (August 13, 1927 – November 4, 2017) on March 18, 1949. The couple had two daughters and two sons.

Duncan contracted Parkinson's disease and died in Altadena, California. He was buried at Arlington National Cemetery on July 1, 2003. His wife was interred with him on May 7, 2018.

Government offices
Preceded by Robert S. Cooper	Director of DARPA; 1985–1988	Succeeded by Ray S. Colladay
Preceded by Donald A. Hicks	Director of Defense Research and Engineering; 1987–1989	Succeeded by Charles M. Herzfeld
