= John F. Clark (engineer) =

American electrical engineer (1920–?)

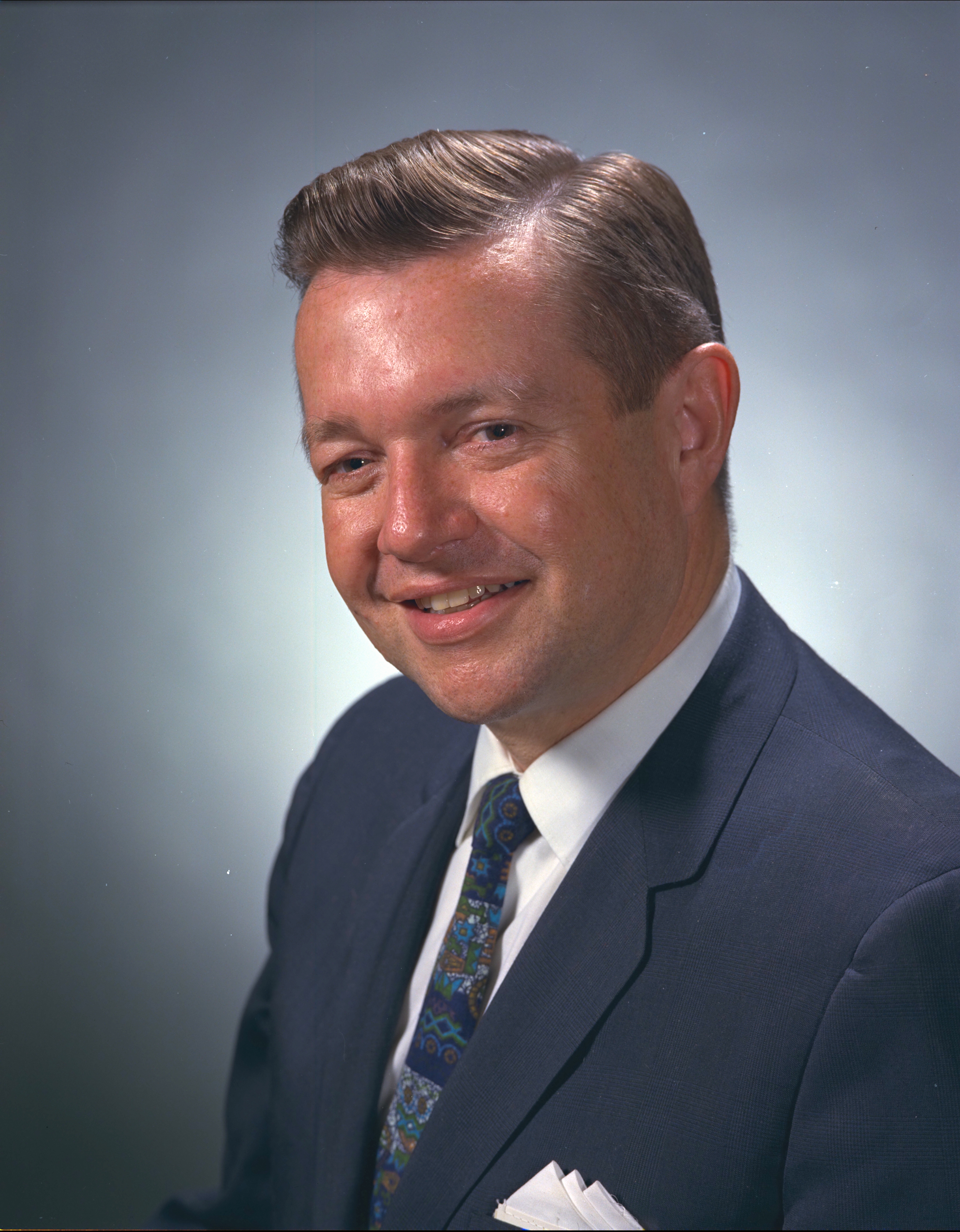
- Portrait in 1966
- Born: December 12, 1920; Reading, Pennsylvania, U.S.
- Education: Lehigh University (BS); George Washington University (MS); University of Maryland (PhD)
- Years active: 1942–1976
- Awards: NASA Distinguished Service Medal

John F. Clark (born December 12, 1920) was an American electrical engineer, physicist and atmospheric scientist who served as the second director of NASA's Goddard Space Flight Center from 1966 to 1976. He oversaw NASA's astronomy and planetary science programs as chairman of the steering committee from 1962 to 1965.

Clark was a member of the Apollo 13 Review Board, convened in 1970 to investigate the oxygen tank explosion that nearly cost the lives of the mission's three-man crew. He was awarded the NASA Distinguished Service Medal, NASA's highest award, in 1969.

== Early life ==
Clark was born in Reading, Pennsylvania in 1920. He earned a Bachelor of Science in electrical engineering with honors from Lehigh University in 1942 and a Master of Science in mathematics from George Washington University in 1946. He received a doctorate in physics from the University of Maryland, College Park in 1956.

== Career ==
After graduating from Lehigh, Clark joined the United States Naval Research Laboratory (NRL) as an electronics engineer. He briefly took on an assistant professorship in electrical engineering at Lehigh in 1947 but returned to the NRL in 1948 to study atmospheric electricity. He became head of the program responsible for using sounding rockets to study phenomena in the atmosphere. Clark was considered an authority on atmospheric physics, particularly regarding the ionosphere.

In 1958, he moved to NASA's Office of Space Sciences and Applications (OSSA) and was appointed director of the geophysics and astronomy programs three years later. He was appointed the director of science at OSSA in 1963 and was chairman of the Space Science Steering Committee until 1965. He oversaw funding for an observatory on Mauna Kea, later named after the Dutch astronomer Gerard Kuiper.

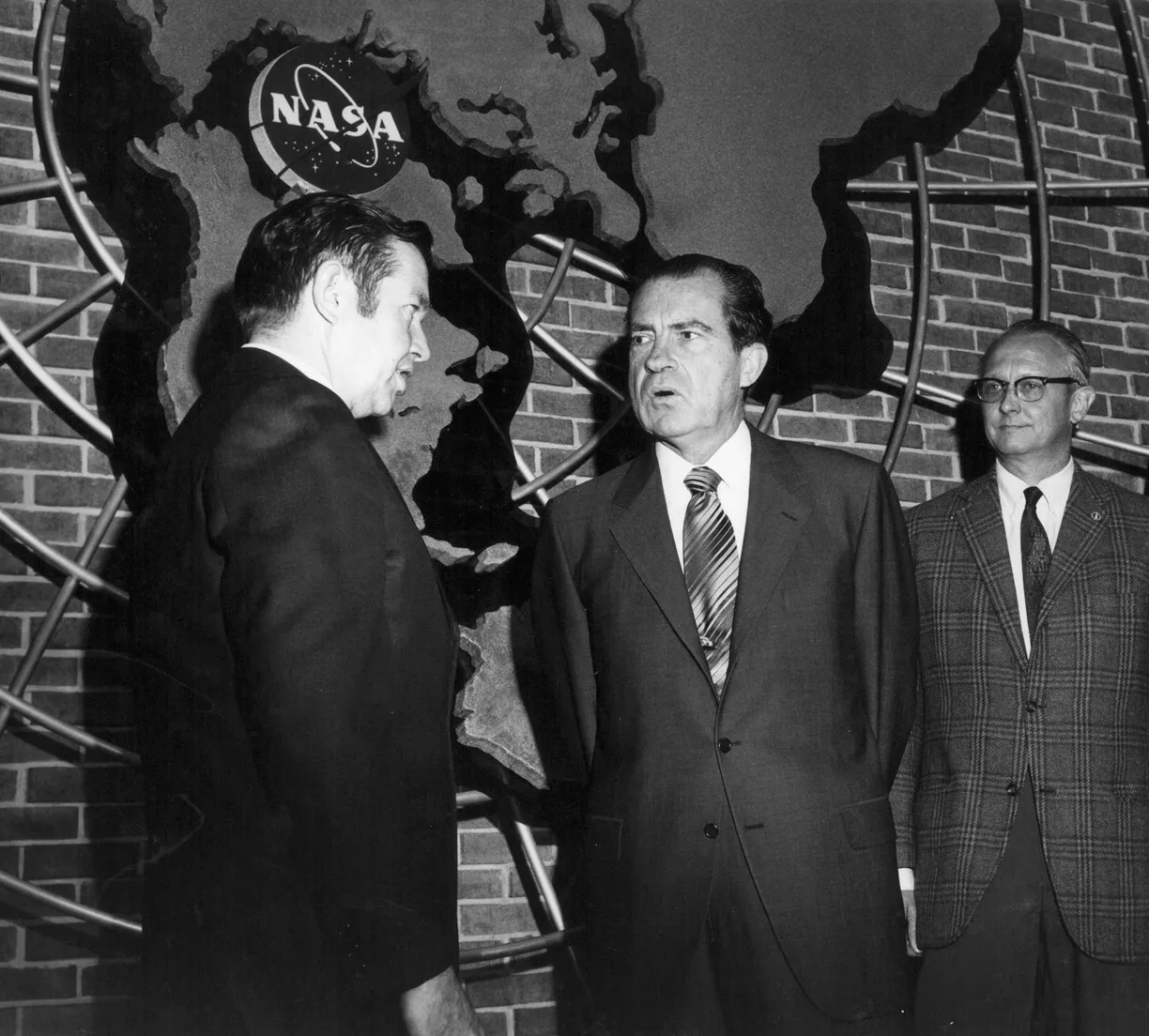
Clark greeting President Richard Nixon during his visit to Goddard for a briefing on Apollo 13

Clark became acting director of Goddard Space Flight Center in July 1965 and was appointed its second director on May 5, 1966, succeeding Harry J. Goett. He served for more than a decade, retiring from NASA on July 1, 1976.

After the explosion of the oxygen tank on Apollo 13, Clark was part of the Apollo 13 Review Board.

In 1974, Clark accepted the Collier Trophy on behalf of NASA, jointly with Daniel J. Fink of General Electric, for the Landsat program, for "proving in 1974 the value of U.S. space technology in the management of the Earth's resources and environment for the benefit of all mankind".

He was a member of the American Association of Physics Teachers, American Geophysical Union, Scientific Research Society of America, and Philosophical Society of Washington. He was awarded the NASA Exceptional Service Medal, NASA Outstanding Leadership Medal, and the NASA Distinguished Service Medal, NASA's highest award.

== Personal life ==
He and his wife had two children. They lived in Silver Spring, Maryland, outside of Washington, D.C. Clark held four patents in electronic circuits.
