= USAF Heritage Flight =

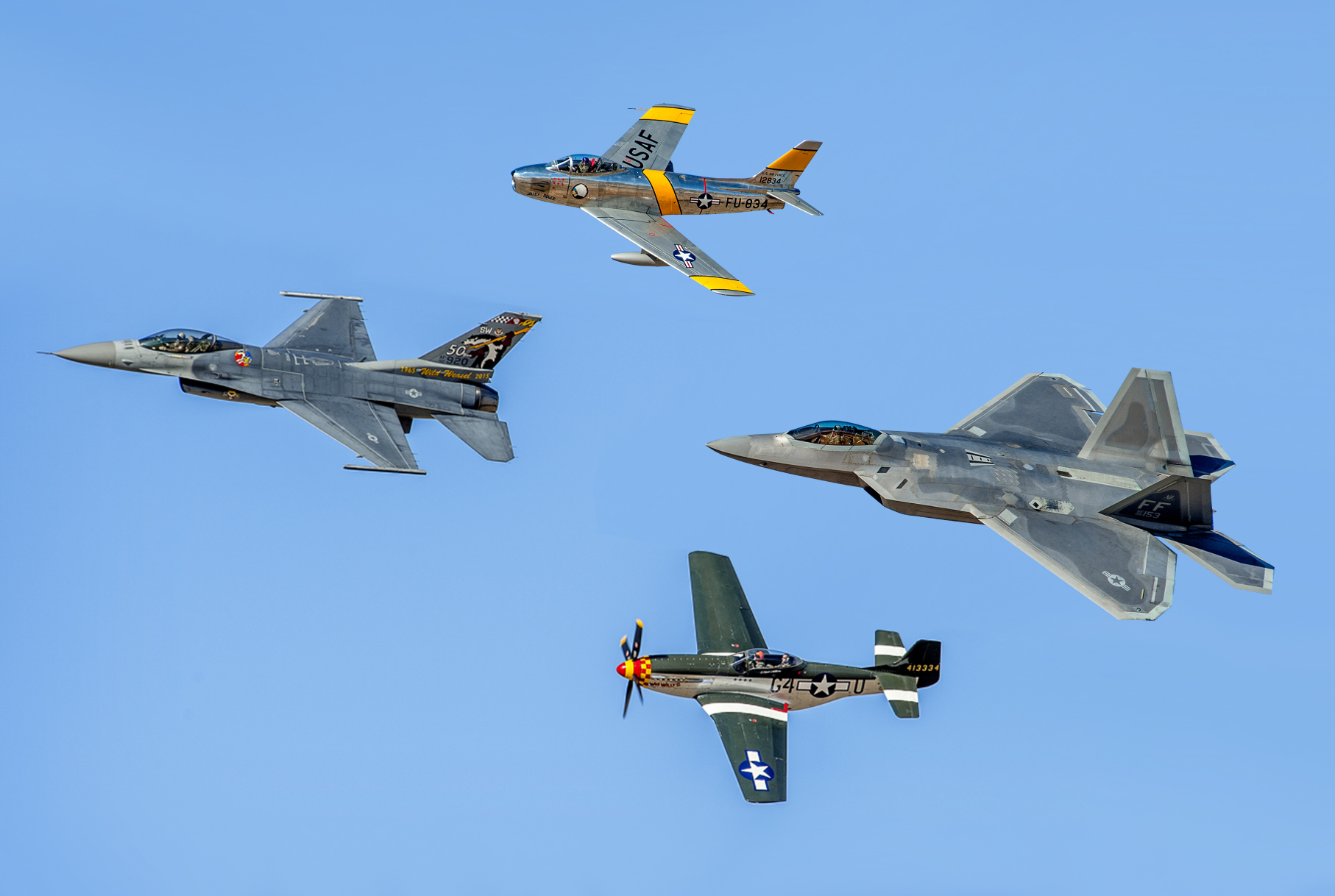
An F-16 Fighting Falcon, P-51D Mustang, F-86 Sabre, and F-22 Raptor fly in a formation representing four generations of American combat aircraft; Heritage Flight over Davis-Monthan AFB

The United States Air Force Heritage Flight was created in 1997 to celebrate the 50th Anniversary of the United States Air Force (USAF) and to showcase how the service evolved since its split from United States Army Air Corps in 1947. It incorporates fighters from World War II, the Vietnam War, the Korean War and other conflicts in which the USAF has been involved.

== See also ==
- Commemorative Air Force
