= Makenzie Lystrup =

American planetary scientist

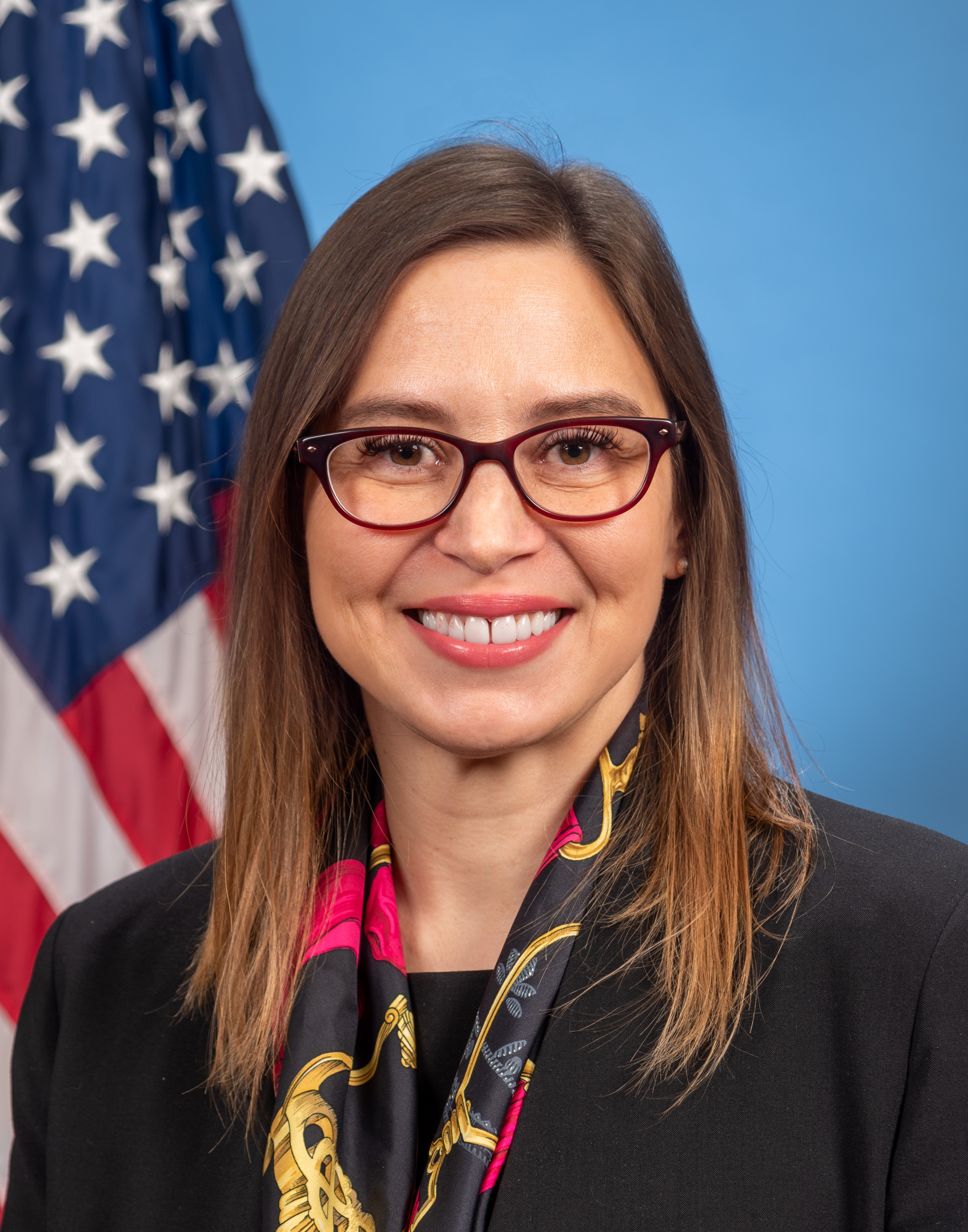

14th Director of the Goddard Space Flight Center
- In office April 10, 2023 – August 1, 2025
- President: Joe Biden
- Preceded by: Dave Mitchell (acting)
- Succeeded by: Cynthia Simmons (acting)

Personal details
- Born: c. 1977 (age 48–49)
- Scientific career
- Education: Portland State University (BS); University College London (PhD)
- Awards: Fellow of the American Association for the Advancement of Science, Fellow of the American Astronomical Society, Fellow of the International Society for Optics and Photonics
- Fields: Planetary science
- Workplaces: NASA Goddard Space Flight Center; Ball Aerospace & Technologies; United States House of Representatives
- Thesis: Near infrared studies of Jupiter's upper atmosphere (2008)
- Doctoral advisor: Steve Miller

Makenzie Lystrup (born c. 1977) is an American planetary scientist and Fellow of the American Association for the Advancement of Science and of SPIE. She was the 14th the director of the Goddard Space Flight Center. She has previously served as the vice president and general manager for civil space at Ball Aerospace.

== Education ==
Lystrup received a Bachelor of Science in physics from Portland State University, where she conducted research in radio astronomy. She then became a full-time volunteer for AmeriCorps, focusing on science, technology, engineering, and mathematics education. She then went to graduate school at University College London and earned a PhD in astrophysics, with a thesis on Jupiter's upper atmosphere. She conducted postdoctoral research as a National Science Foundation Astronomy & Astrophysics Postdoctoral Research Fellow, working at the Laboratory for Atmospheric & Space Physics in Boulder, Colorado (for which she wrote an undergraduate science career timeline), and at the University of Liège in Belgium. Her research focused on investigating planetary atmospheres and magnetospheres, in particular those of Jupiter.

== Career ==
Lystrup served as an AIP-ASA Congressional Fellow in the office of representative Edward Markey from 2011 to 2012. During that time, she managed a portfolio of issues including technology, national defense, nuclear energy, and nuclear nonproliferation. She joined Ball Aerospace in January 2013, in the Strategic Operations office in Washington, D.C. In 2018, she became the Vice President & General Manager for Civil Space. During her tenure at Ball Aerospace, Lystrup was responsible for a number of significant new civil space missions, substantially increasing the firm's revenues. Noteworthy missions include the development of NASA's IXPE mission, SPHEREx mission, and Green Propellant Infusion Mission, NOAA's SWFO-L1 mission, two studies for NASA/NOAA's GeoXO program and the launch of the James Webb Space Telescope.

Lystrup was appointed the director of the Goddard Space Flight Center in April 2023. She was the first woman to serve in the position. She resigned as director on August 1, 2025.

== Recognition ==
Lystrup has served on committees for several organizations, namely the University Corporation for Atmospheric Research (UCAR), which manages the National Center for Atmospheric Research (NCAR), the Association of Universities for Research in Astronomy (AURA), International Society for Optics and Photonics (SPIE), the American Astronomical Society (AAS, formerly as the Chair of the Committee on Planetary Science Policy), the University of Colorado, and CO-LABS. Lystrup was named Fellow of the SPIE in 2023 for her achievements in optics. Also in 2023, Lystrup was named Fellow of the American Astronomical Society. In 2019, Lystrup was named Fellow of the American Association for the Advancement of Science for her research achievements in infrared astronomy and planetary science, as well as work in science policy, advocacy, and aerospace leadership. Additionally, Lystrup was named an Amelia Earhart Fellow in 2007. In 2023 she was promoted as a SPIE fellow.
