= Under Secretary of Defense for Research and Engineering =

United States federal government position

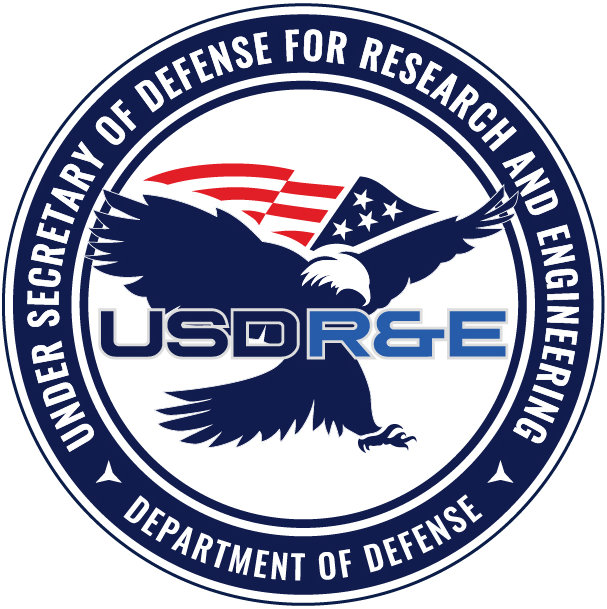
- Logo of the Office of the Under Secretary of Defense for Research and Engineering

- Flag of an under secretary of defense

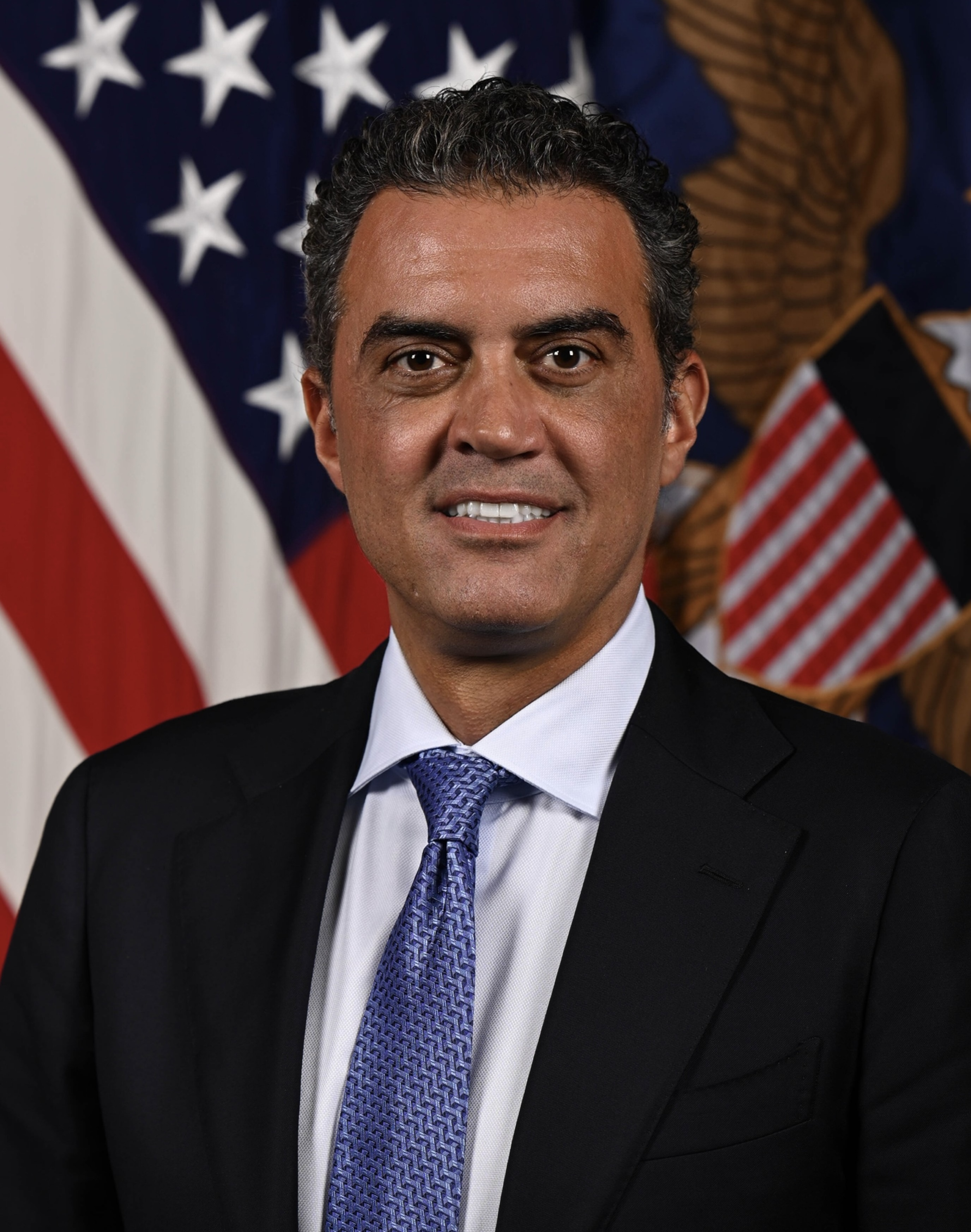
- Incumbent; Emil Michael since May 20, 2025
- Office of the Secretary of Defense
- Reports to: Secretary of Defense; Deputy Secretary of Defense
- Nominator: The president with the advice and consent of the Senate
- Term length: No fixed term
- Website: Office of the Under Secretary

The under secretary of defense for research and engineering, abbreviated USD (R&E), is a senior official of the United States Department of Defense (DoD). The USD (R&E) is charged with the development and oversight of technology strategy for the DoD. The post (or effectively the same post) has at various times had the titles Assistant Secretary of Defense for Research and Engineering (ASD(R&E)), or Director of Defense Research and Engineering (DDR&E). The latter title has itself historically varied between the rank of under secretary and that of assistant secretary.

USD (R&E) is the principal staff advisor for research and engineering matters to the secretary and deputy secretary of defense. In this capacity, USD (R&E) serves as the chief technology officer (CTO) for the Department of Defense charged with the development and oversight of DoD technology strategy in concert with the department's current and future requirements. The goal of USD (R&E) is to extend the capabilities of current war fighting systems, develop breakthrough capabilities, hedge against an uncertain future through a set of scientific and engineering options, and counter strategic surprise. USD (R&E) also provides advice and assistance in developing policies for rapid technology transition.

From 1987 until 1 February 2018, ASD(R&E) was subordinate to the under secretary of defense for acquisition, technology and logistics. On 1 February 2018, the research and engineering were split into an independent office, with the head position being elevated from an assistant secretary to an under secretary level. The remaining acquisition office became the Office of the Under Secretary of Defense for Acquisition and Sustainment (A&S).

== Organization ==
Organizations included under the USD (R&E) include the following. As of February 2018, organizational relationships remained to be finalized as the organization was being formed. The organizational structure was finalized in July 2018. Agencies marked with an asterisk (*) are not part of the Office of the Secretary of Defense.

- Deputy Under Secretary of Defense for Research and Engineering
  - Technical Director of Defense Research and Engineering for AI
  - Technical Director of Defense Research and Engineering for 5G
- Director of Defense Research and Engineering for Research and Technology
  - Deputy Director for Strategic Technology Protection and Exploitation
    - Defense Microelectronics Activity*
  - Deputy Director for Research, Technology, and Laboratories
  - Defense Technical Information Center*
- Director of Defense Research and Engineering for Advanced Capabilities
  - Deputy Director for Mission Engineering and Integration
  - Deputy Director for Developmental Test and Evaluation
    - Test Resource Management Center*
- Director of Defense Research and Engineering for Modernization
  - Assistant Director of Defense Research and Engineering for Biotechnology
  - Assistant Director of Defense Research and Engineering for Autonomy
  - Assistant Director of Defense Research and Engineering for Cyber
  - Assistant Director of Defense Research and Engineering for Directed Energy
  - Assistant Director of Defense Research and Engineering for FNC3
  - Assistant Director of Defense Research and Engineering for Hypersonics
  - Assistant Director of Defense Research and Engineering for Microelectronics
  - Assistant Director of Defense Research and Engineering for Quantum Science
  - Assistant Director of Defense Research and Engineering for Space
- Director of Space Development Agency
- Strategic Intelligence Analysis Cell
- Strategic Capabilities Office Under the National Defense Authorization Act of 2020, the Strategic Capabilities Office was moved from a subordinate unit under USD(R&E) to a direct report to the Deputy Secretary of Defense.
- Defense Innovation Unit
- Missile Defense Agency*
- DARPA*

Upon the February 2018 reorganization, the USD (R&E) assumed responsibility for administering the Small Business Innovation Research and Rapid Innovation Fund programs.

== History ==
The National Security Act of 1947 and its 1949 amendments established the Department of Defense, including the establishment of two statutory boards: a Munitions Board, and a Research and Development Board. In June 1953, President Eisenhower's Reorganization Plan No. 6 abolished the boards as such, and created six new Assistant Secretaries of Defense. Two of these assistant secretary positions—Applications Engineering, and Research and Development—were combined in March 1957 to become the Assistant Secretary of Defense for Research and Engineering (ASD(R&E)).

Under the DoD Reorganization Act of 1958 (PL 85-599, effective 6 August 1958), the position of ASD (R&E) was abolished and replaced by a Director of Defense Research and Engineering (DDR&E).

From 19 May 1961, until 15 July 1965, a Deputy Director of Defense Research and Engineering held the additional title of ASD(R&E), on the theory that this position reported to, in rank, an under secretary—the DDR&E. On 21 October 1977, PL 95-140 made the rank of the DDR&E unambiguous by renaming it to the Under Secretary of Defense for Research and Engineering (USD (R&E)).

The history of Department of Defense management of science and technology up to the 1980s is described at greater length in a report available from the Defense Technical Information Center (DTIC).

The Military Retirement Reform Act of 1986 expanded the scope of USD (R&E) position to encompass acquisition and logistics, as well as technology, and it was renamed USD(AT&L). A subordinate position at the assistant secretary level was reestablished with the previous title DDR&E. However, budget control of the technology portfolio was kept by USD(AT&L), diminishing the importance of the DDR&E position subsequently.

On 7 January 2011, President Obama signed the National Defense Authorization Act with several redesignated titles within the Department of Defense. These changes included renaming the DDR&E as, once again, ASD(R&E).

On 1 February 2018, the Office of the Under Secretary of Defense for Acquisition, Technology and Logistics was split into two new offices: the Office of the Under Secretary of Defense for Research and Engineering (R&E) and the Office of the Undersecretary of Defense for Acquisition and Sustainment (A&S), as a result of the National Defense Authorization Act for Fiscal Year 2017.

The latest restructuring establishes three new Assistant Secretary of Defense positions, along with eight Deputy Assistant Secretaries of Defense, replacing the role of Deputy Chief Technology Officer.

== Office holders ==
The table below includes both the various names which this position has been named over time, as well as all the holders of those various offices. Acting officers have a beige background.

| Name | Tenure | SecDef(s) Served Under | President(s) Served Under |
|---|---|---|---|
Chairman, Research and Development Board
| Vannevar Bush | 30 September 1947 – 14 October 1948 | James V. Forrestal | Harry Truman |
| Karl T. Compton | 15 October 1948 – 14 March 1950 | James V. Forrestal; Louis A. Johnson | Harry Truman |
| William Webster | 15 March 1950 – 31 July 1951 | Louis A. Johnson; George C. Marshall | Harry Truman |
| Walter G. Whitman | 1 August 1951 – 29 June 1953 | George C. Marshall; Robert A. Lovett; Charles E. Wilson | Harry Truman; Dwight Eisenhower |
Assistant Secretary of Defense (Research and Development)
| Donald A. Quarles | 1 September 1953 – 14 August 1955 | Charles E. Wilson | Dwight Eisenhower |
| Clifford C. Furnas | 1 December 1955 – 15 February 1957 | Charles E. Wilson | Dwight Eisenhower |
Assistant Secretary of Defense (Applications Engineering)
| Frank D. Newbury | 18 August 1953 – 17 March 1957 | Charles E. Wilson | Dwight Eisenhower |
Assistant Secretary of Defense (Research and Engineering)
| Frank D. Newbury | 18 March 1957 – 17 May 1957 | Charles E. Wilson | Dwight Eisenhower |
| Paul D. Foote | 10 September 1957 – 31 October 1958 | Charles E. Wilson; Neil H. McElroy | Dwight Eisenhower |
| John H. Rubel (as Deputy DDR&E) | 19 May 1961 – 15 June 1963 | Thomas S. Gates; Robert S. McNamara | Dwight Eisenhower; John F. Kennedy |
| Eugene G. Fubini (as Deputy DDR&E) | 3 July 1963 – 15 July 1965 | Robert S. McNamara | John F. Kennedy |
Director, Defense Research and Engineering
| Herbert F. York | 30 December 1958 – 30 April 1961 | Neil H. McElroy; Thomas S. Gates; Robert S. McNamara | Dwight Eisenhower |
| Herbert F. York | 30 December 1958 – 30 April 1961 | Neil H. McElroy; Thomas S. Gates; Robert S. McNamara | John F. Kennedy |
| Harold Brown | 8 May 1961 – 30 September 1965 | Robert S. McNamara | John F. Kennedy |
| John S. Foster, Jr. | 1 October 1965 – 21 June 1973 | Robert S. McNamara; Clark M. Clifford; Melvin R. Laird; Elliot L. Richardson | Lyndon Johnson; Richard Nixon |
| Malcolm R. Currie | 21 June 1973 – 20 January 1977 | James R. Schlesinger; Donald H. Rumsfeld | Richard Nixon; Gerald Ford |
| William J. Perry | 11 April 1977 – 21 October 1977 | Harold Brown | Jimmy Carter |
Under Secretary of Defense for Research and Engineering
| William J. Perry | 4 November 1977 – 20 January 1981 | Harold Brown | Jimmy Carter |
| Walter B. LaBerge | 21 January 1981 – 10 March 1981 | Caspar W. Weinberger | Ronald Reagan |
| James P. Wade, Jr. | 11 March 1981 – 6 May 1981 | Caspar W. Weinberger | Ronald Reagan |
| Richard D. DeLauer | 7 May 1981 – 4 November 1984 | Caspar W. Weinberger | Ronald Reagan |
| James P. Wade, Jr. | 1 December 1981 – 5 July 1985 | Caspar W. Weinberger | Ronald Reagan |
| Donald A. Hicks | 6 August 1985 – 10 October 1986 | Caspar W. Weinberger | Ronald Reagan |
Director, Defense Research and Engineering
| Robert C. Duncan | 17 December 1987 – 30 November 1989 | Frank C. Carlucci III; William H. Taft IV (Acting); Richard B. Cheney | Ronald Reagan; George H. W. Bush |
| Charles M. Herzfeld | 12 March 1990 – 18 May 1991 | Richard B. Cheney | George H. W. Bush |
| Victor H. Reis | 3 December 1991 – 31 May 1993 | Richard B. Cheney; Leslie Aspin, Jr. | George H. W. Bush; William Clinton |
| Anita K. Jones | 1 June 1993 – 23 May 1997 | Leslie Aspin, Jr. William J. Perry; William S. Cohen | William Clinton |
| Hans M. Mark | 1 July 1998 – 10 May 2001 | William S. Cohen; Donald H. Rumsfeld | William Clinton; George W. Bush |
| Ronald M. Sega | 14 August 2001 – 3 August 2005 | Donald H. Rumsfeld | George W. Bush |
| John J. Young Jr. | 2 November 2005 – 20 November 2007 | Donald H. Rumsfeld; Robert M. Gates | George W. Bush |
| Alan R. Shaffer | 21 November 2007 – 1 July 2009 | Robert M. Gates | George W. Bush; Barack Obama |
| Zachary J. Lemnios | 2 July 2009 – 7 January 2011 | Robert M. Gates | Barack Obama |
Assistant Secretary of Defense (Research and Engineering)
| Zachary J. Lemnios | 7 January 2011 – 30 November 2012 | Leon Panetta | Barack Obama |
| Alan R. Shaffer | 1 December 2012 – 12 June 2015 | Leon Panetta; Chuck Hagel; Ashton B. Carter | Barack Obama |
| Stephen P. Welby | 13 June 2015 – 13 December 2015 | Ashton B. Carter | Barack Obama |
| Stephen P. Welby | 14 December 2015 – 20 January 2017 | Ashton B. Carter | Barack Obama |
| Mary J. Miller | 20 January 2017 – 1 February 2018 | James Mattis | Donald Trump |
Under Secretary of Defense for Research and Engineering
| Ellen Lord | 1 February 2018 – 15 February 2018 | James Mattis | Donald Trump |
| Michael D. Griffin | 19 February 2018 – 10 July 2020 | James Mattis; Mark Esper | Donald Trump |
| Michael Kratsios | 10 July 2020 – 20 January 2021 | Mark Esper | Donald Trump |
| Terry Emmert | 20 January 2021 – 24 July 2021 | Lloyd Austin | Joe Biden |
| Heidi Shyu | 25 July 2021 – 20 January 2025 | Lloyd Austin | Joe Biden |
| James G. Mazol | 20 January 2025 – 20 May 2025 | Pete Hegseth | Donald Trump |
| Emil Michael | 20 May 2025 – Present | Pete Hegseth | Donald Trump |
