= A. Thomas Young =

American aerospace engineer and executive (born 1938)

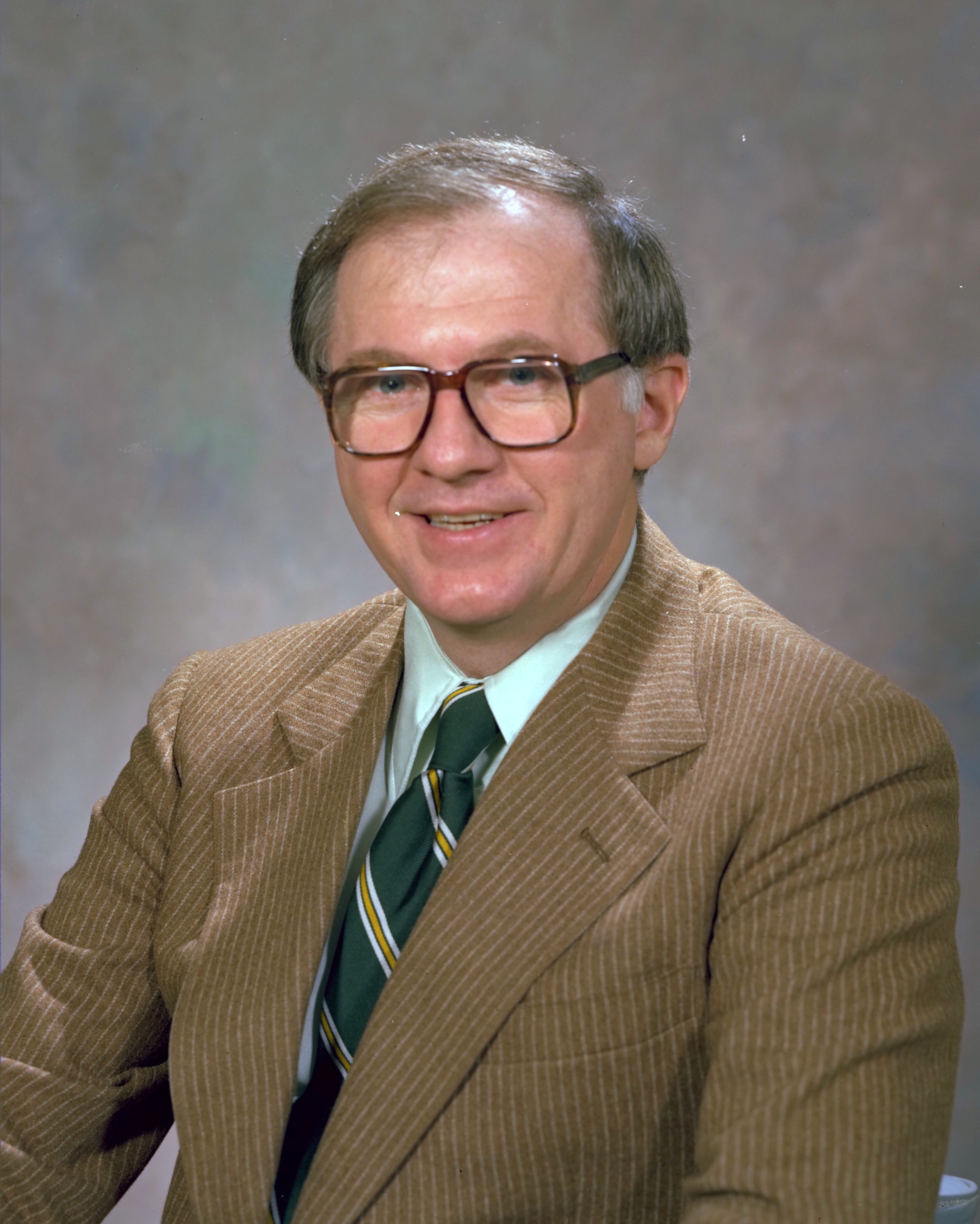
- Portrait in 1979

4th Director of Goddard Space Flight Center
- In office 1979–1982
- Preceded by: Robert S. Cooper
- Succeeded by: Noel W. Hinners

Personal details
- Born: 1938 (age 87–88) Wachapreague, Virginia, U.S.
- Education: University of Virginia (BS); Massachusetts Institute of Technology (MS)
- Awards: NASA Distinguished Service Medal

A. Thomas "Tom" Young (born 1938) is an American aerospace engineer and executive. He served as the fourth director of NASA's Goddard Space Flight Center from 1979 to 1982.

He was mission director of NASA's Viking program Mars landing program and director of the Planetary Program at NASA Headquarters. In 1977, he received NASA's highest honor, the NASA Distinguished Service Medal for his work. After leaving NASA, he became president and chief operating officer of Martin Marietta and executive vice president of Lockheed Martin.

== Early life and education ==
Young was born in 1938 in Wachapreague, Virginia, on Virginia's Eastern Shore. He received a Bachelor of Science in aeronautical engineering and a second in mechanical engineering from the University of Virginia in 1961. He later earned a Master of Management degree in 1972 from the Massachusetts Institute of Technology, which he attended on a Sloan Research Fellowship while employed at NASA's Langley Research Center.

== Career ==
=== NASA Langley Research Center ===
Young joined NASA's Langley Research Center in 1961, where he began developing attitude control systems and trajectory designs for sounding rockets and space vehicles. He subsequently moved to the Lunar Orbiter Project Office, where he led the mission study group. The group's risk assessment produced a distributed photographic strategy that imaged a large portion of the lunar surface rather than a select few sites, providing candidate Apollo landing zones. Five successful Lunar Orbiter missions launched between 1966 and 1967 photographed 99 percent of the Moon's surface.

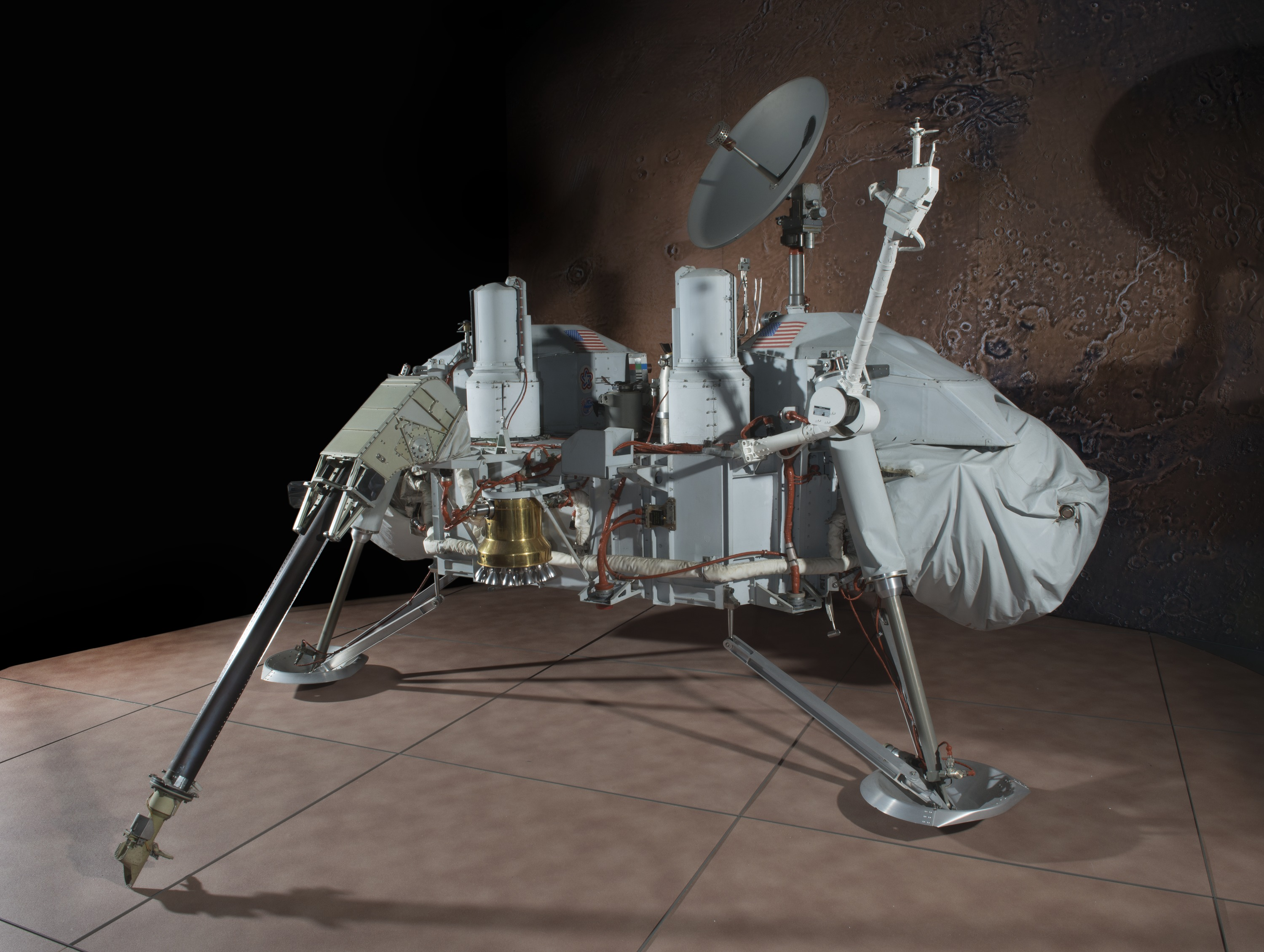
Viking lander

Young was assigned to the Mars Viking program, serving first as science integration manager and then as mission director. He established the Mission and Science Working Group, which spanned the full length of the Viking project from 1968 to 1976 and brought Langley's engineering capabilities into direct collaboration with the planetary science community. The two Viking landers and orbiters successfully reached Mars and the project laid much of the technological groundwork for subsequent Mars exploration.

=== Leadership at NASA ===
In 1976, Young was appointed director of the Planetary Program in the Office of Space Science at NASA Headquarters in Washington, D.C., where he oversaw budget management and strategic planning and contributed to the Voyager program and the Venus Orbiter Imaging Radar project. In 1978, he was appointed deputy director of Ames Research Center in Silicon Valley, California.

Young was appointed the fourth director of NASA's Goddard Space Flight Center in Greenbelt, Maryland in 1979, succeeding Robert S. Cooper. He served until 1982 and was succeeded by Noel W. Hinners.

=== Martin Marietta and Lockheed Martin ===
Young left NASA in 1982 and joined the Martin Marietta Corporation as vice president of aerospace research and engineering. He subsequently served as president of Martin Marietta Electronics & Missiles Group in Orlando, Florida, and as senior vice president of the corporation before becoming president and chief operating officer from 1990 to 1995. Following the merger of Martin Marietta with Lockheed, he was appointed executive vice president of the newly formed Lockheed Martin Corporation, a position he held until his retirement in 1995.

=== Post-retirement advisory work ===
Following his retirement from Lockheed Martin, Young became a prominent independent reviewer of major space programs and national security space policy and has testified before Congress numerous times. He chaired the NASA Mars Independent Assessment Team (2000), the International Space Station Management and Cost Evaluation Committee (2001), and a joint Defense Science Board and Air Force Scientific Advisory Board review of the acquisition of national security space programs (2003). He also led a congressionally mandated review of the organization and management of national security space (2008) and an independent review of NOAA's weather satellite enterprise.

He has served as president of the Virginia Institute of Marine Science Foundation and as a member of the Committee on Astronomy and Astrophysics and the Virginia Academy of Science. He has also been a member of the NASA Advisory Council and a director of the Virginia Engineering Foundation of the University of Virginia's School of Engineering and Applied Science. He is a member of The University of Virginia's Raven Society.

He also served as chairman of the National Business Committee for the Arts. He sits on the board of directors for BFGoodrich, Cooper Industries, Henkel North American Consumer Goods, and Potomac Electric Power Co.

Young was elected to the National Academy of Engineering in 1992. He is an honorary fellow of the American Institute of Aeronautics and Astronautics (AIAA), and a fellow of the American Astronautical Society, Royal Astronomical Society, and the International Academy of Astronautics. The AIAA offered the A. Thomas Young Undergraduate Scholarship from 2001 to 2012.

== Awards ==
- General James E. Hill Lifetime Achievement Award (Space Foundation, 2014)
- Honorary Doctor of Science, Salisbury University (1998)
- NASA Outstanding Leadership Medal (1992)
- National Academy of Engineering (1992)
- Distinguished Executive Presidential Rank Award (1981)
- NASA Distinguished Service Medal (1977)

== Personal life ==
Young was born and raised on Virginia's Eastern Shore. He has maintained ongoing ties to Virginia through his work with the Virginia Institute of Marine Science and the University of Virginia School of Engineering and Applied Science.
