= Robert S. Cooper =

American defense official (1932–2007)

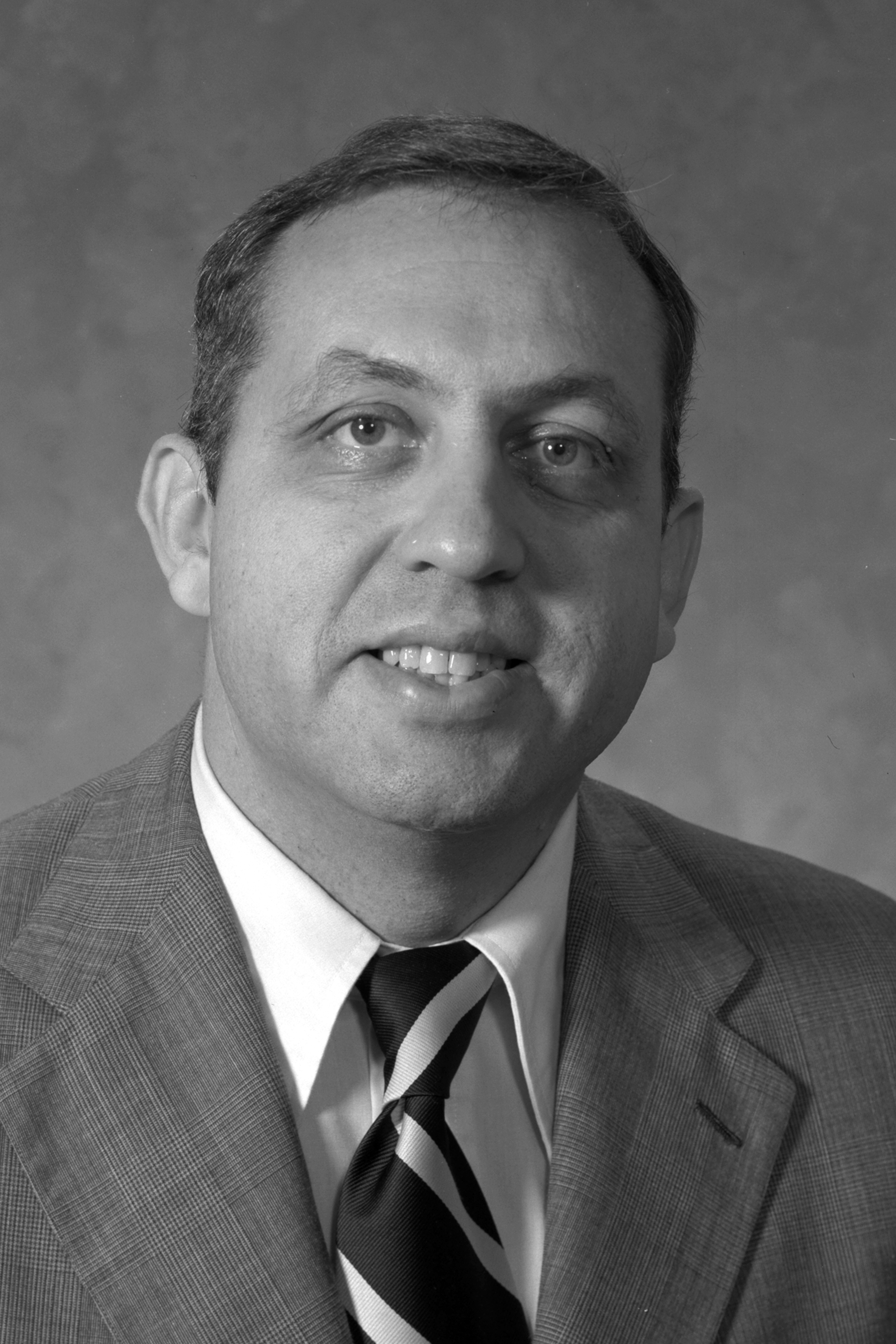
- Portrait in 1976

10th Director of DARPA
- In office 1981–1985
- Preceded by: Robert R. Fossum
- Succeeded by: Robert C. Duncan

Assistant Secretary of Defense for Research and Technology
- In office 1984–1985

3rd Director of Goddard Space Flight Center
- In office July 1, 1976 – June 1, 1979
- Preceded by: John F. Clark
- Succeeded by: Ed Smylie

Personal details
- Born: February 8, 1932 Kansas City, Missouri, U.S.
- Died: July 2, 2007 (aged 75) Easton, Maryland, U.S.
- Education: University of Iowa (BS); Ohio State University (MS); Massachusetts Institute of Technology (DSc)
- Awards: DoD Meritorious Civilian Service Award

Robert Shanklin Cooper (February 8, 1932 – July 2, 2007) was an American electrical engineer and defense official. He was the third director of NASA's Goddard Space Flight Center from 1976 to 1979 and the tenth director of DARPA from 1981 to 1985.

He was an Assistant Secretary of Defense under President Ronald Reagan and collaborated in the "Star Wars" Strategic Defense Initiative.

== Early life and education ==
Cooper was born in Kansas City, Missouri, in 1932. He was raised in Cedar Rapids, Iowa, and attended the University of Iowa, where he received a Bachelor of Science in electrical engineering in 1954. Cooper was a member of Sigma Xi, Tau Beta Pi, and Eta Kappa Nu. He was a Westinghouse Fellow at Ohio State University, earning a Master of Science in 1958 in electrical engineering.

He attended the Massachusetts Institute of Technology (MIT), earning a Doctor of Science in electrical engineering and mathematics in 1963. Cooper was one of the Ford Foundation's thirty-nine postdoctoral research fellows at MIT until 1965.

== Career ==
After graduating from Iowa, Cooper served in the United States Air Force for two years. After attaining his doctorate, he remained at MIT as an assistant professor from 1963 to 1966. He joined the MIT Lincoln Laboratory in Lexington, Massachusetts, as an electronics research engineer for six years. From 1968 to 1972, he served as electronics division director.

In August 1972, he joined the United States Department of Defense (DoD), serving as assistant director for defense research and engineering at the Office of the Secretary of Defense. At the Pentagon, he managed the development of NAVSTAR, the United States's first Global Positioning System. He was also the chief technical advisor to Secretary of Defense James R. Schlesinger on NASA projects including the Space Shuttle.

Cooper joined Goddard Space Flight Center and served as deputy director beginning in 1975.

On July 1, 1976, he was appointed the third director of NASA Goddard by President Gerald Ford, succeeding John F. Clark. He served until June 1, 1979, and was succeeded by Ed Smylie. Upon leaving NASA, Cooper became vice president of engineering at Satellite Business Systems.

President Ronald Reagan appointed Cooper as director of DARPA in 1981, succeeding Robert R. Fossum. As director, he testified before Congress on the topics of supercomputers and stealth bombers. He contributed to the Reagan administration's contentious Strategic Defense Initiative, nicknamed the "Star Wars" program in the press. In 1984, Reagan nominated him to be the Assistant Secretary of Defense for Research and Technology, a newly created position. He was criticized by Republicans such as the rancher Malcolm Wallop of being "disinclined to build weapons" in favor of futuristic technology development, including supercomputers. He served as DARPA director until 1985. He was succeeded by Robert C. Duncan the following year.

After his departure from DARPA, he worked in private industry, including Atlantic Aerospace Electronics Corp (later acquired by Titan Corporation) in Greenbelt, Maryland.

He was a member of the American Association for the Advancement of Science, the American Physical Society, and the Defense Science Board.

Cooper died in Easton, Maryland, in 2007, aged 75.

== Personal life ==
He resided in McLean, Virginia, while working at the DoD.

== Awards ==
- Secretary of Defense Meritorious Civilian Service Award
