= Judith Racusin =

American astrophysicist

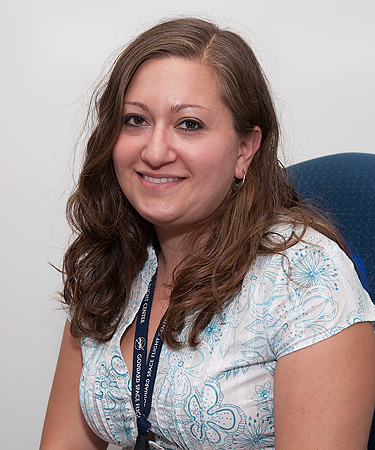
- Education: University of Michigan (BS); Pennsylvania State University (PhD)
- Scientific career
- Fields: Astrophysics
- Workplaces: Goddard Space Flight Center
- Thesis: The Collimation Signatures of Gamma-ray Bursts: Jet Properties and Energetics Inferred from X-ray Afterglow Observations (2009)
- Doctoral advisor: David N. Burrows

Judith Lea Racusin is an American astrophysicist. She works at Goddard Space Flight Center as a research aerospace technologist in fields and particles. Racusin researches gamma-ray bursts, supernova remnants, high-energy astrophysics, and instrumentation.

== Life and work ==
Racusin completed a B.S. in astronomy, astrophysics, and general physics at University of Michigan College of Literature, Science, and the Arts in 2003. In 2009, Racusin earned a Ph.D. in astronomy and astrophysics at Pennsylvania State University. Her dissertation was titled The Collimation Signatures of Gamma-ray Bursts: Jet Properties and Energetics Inferred from X-ray Afterglow Observations. Her doctoral advisor was David N. Burrows.

In 2021, Racusin was officially listed as an Astronomy And Space Scientist working at the Goddard Space Flight Center in Greenbelt, Maryland.
