= Harry J. Goett =

American aerospace engineer

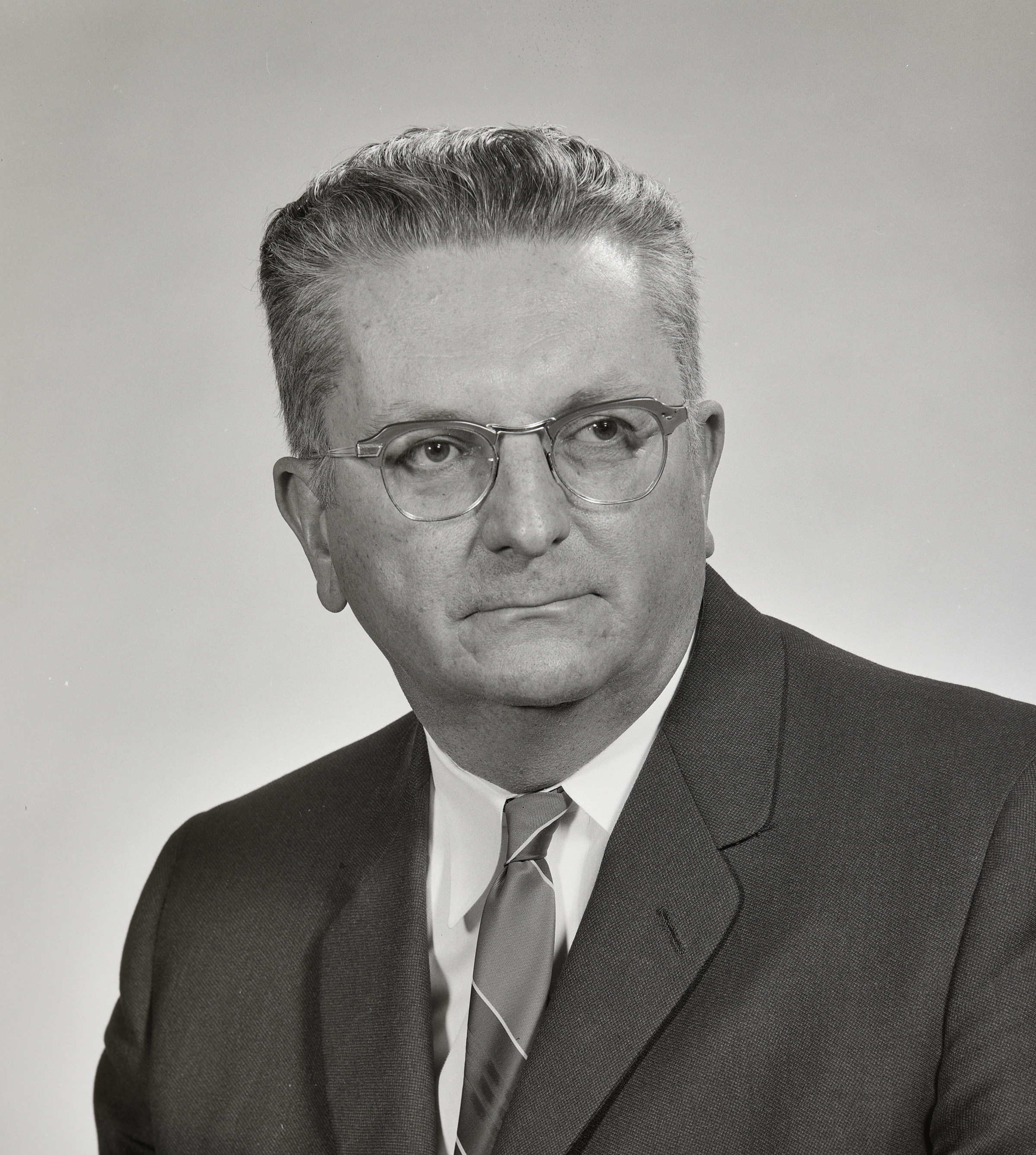
- Goett in 1964
- Born: November 14, 1910; The Bronx, New York, U.S.
- Died: January 6, 2000 (aged 89); Palo Alto, California, U.S.
- Education: College of the Holy Cross (BS); New York University (MS)
- Occupation: Aerospace engineer
- Known for: NASA Goddard Space Flight Center
- Spouse: Barbara Goett

Harry J. Goett (November 14, 1910 – January 6, 2000) was an American aerospace engineer. He was the first director of NASA Goddard Space Flight Center from 1959 to 1965.

== Early life and education ==
Goett was born in a German-American neighborhood in The Bronx in 1910. His family owned a wood products business, and his father died when he was 12. As the eldest male son, he assumed responsibility of raising his two younger brothers with his mother.

Goett graduated from the College of the Holy Cross in Worcester, Massachusetts, with a Bachelor of Science in physics in 1931. He then attended New York University, where he earned a degree in aeronautical engineering in 1933.

== Career ==
After graduating, Goett worked at private firms before joining the National Advisory Committee for Aeronautics (NACA) Langley Aeronautical Laboratory in 1936. He moved to Ames Aeronautical Laboratory in 1940 as part of the Center's initial staff and served as chief of the full-scale and flight research division from 1948 until 1959. There, he directed studies on the aerodynamics of aircraft and spacecraft in the upper atmosphere, and led research on aircraft stability, control and guidance, and atmospheric entry heating. He was described by Stanley F. Schmidt, who worked under him at Ames, as one of the four most influential men at Ames alongside Jack Parsons, Smith J. DeFrance, and Harry Julian Allen, and as "one of the greatest technical leaders of our times".

After the establishment of NASA in October 1958, Goett chaired the NASA committee (called the Goett Committee) that developed early space research at the agency, including a national booster program, planning for crewed spaceflight, and re-entry flight research. His committee established a Moon landing as NASA's principal goal.

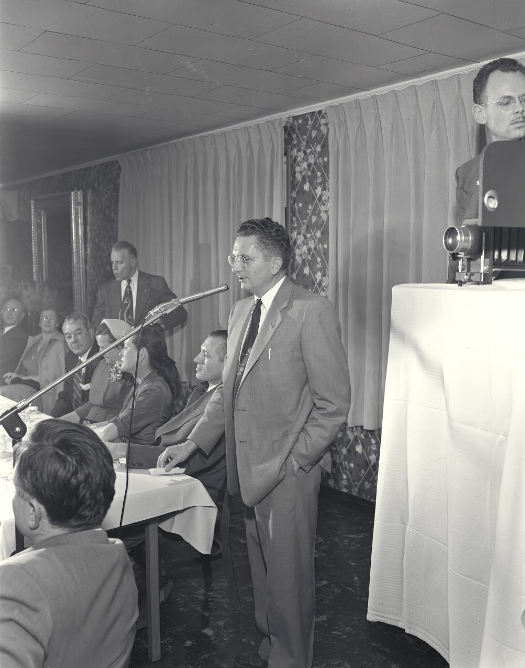
Harry J. Goett at NASA (1957)

Goett was appointed the first director of Goddard Space Flight Center in 1959. Under his leadership, the center executed 35 satellite projects with 100+ scientific experiments. He was succeeded as director by John F. Clark in 1966, after which he became a special assistant to NASA administrator James E. Webb.

He left public service and became director for plans and programs at Philco Western Development Labs in California. He also played a central role in the development of communications satellites at Ford Aerospace before retiring in 1975.

He died at the Stanford University Hospital in Palo Alto in 2000.

== Awards ==
- Honorary Doctorate of Engineering, New Mexico State University (1960)
- Honorary Doctorate of Science, College of the Holy Cross (1964)

== Personal life ==
He married Barbara Goett, and the couple had four children. He spent the latter part of his life in Los Altos Hills, California.
