= John M. Klineberg =

American aerospace engineer (1938–2022)

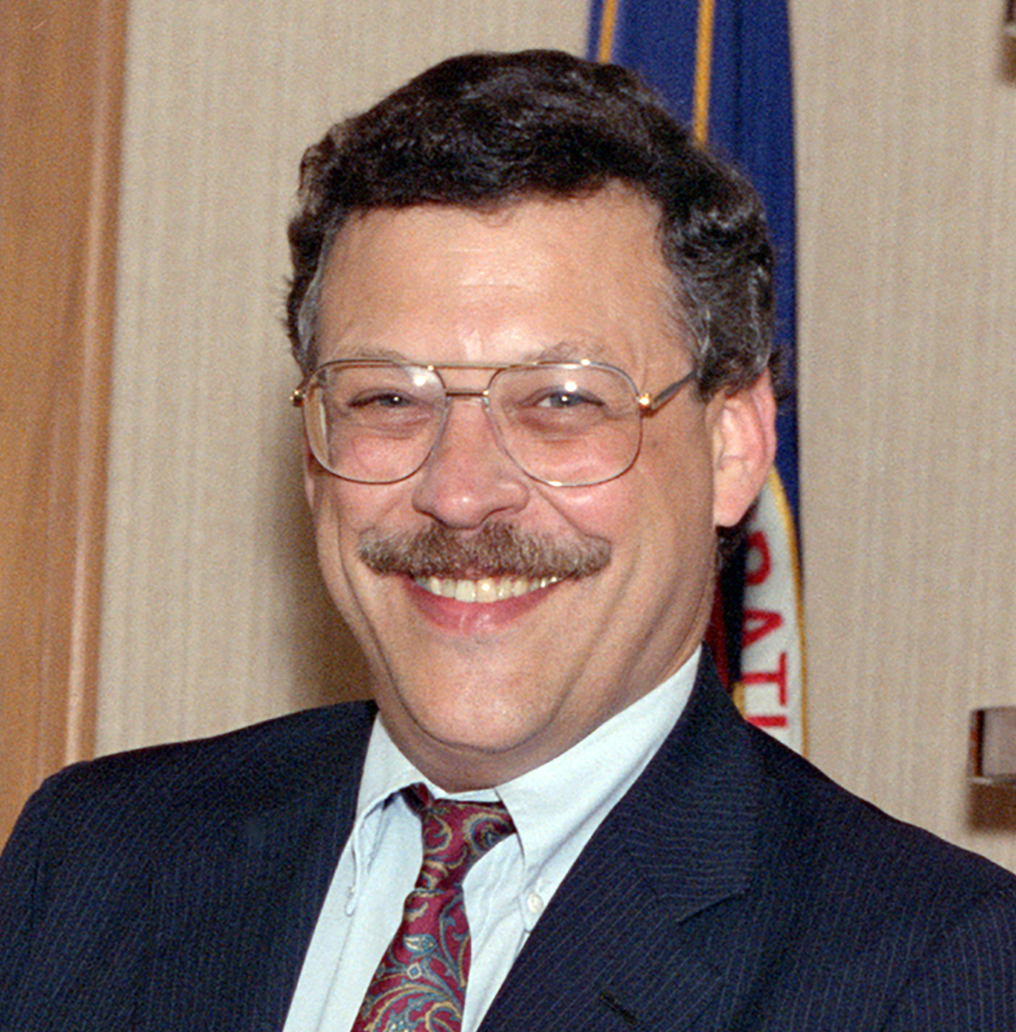
- Portrait in 1990
- Born: John Michael Klineberg; October 16, 1938; Scarsdale, New York, U.S.
- Died: December 31, 2022 (aged 84); Davis, California, U.S.
- Spouse: Anne-Marie Klineberg (m. 1967; died 2004)
- Awards: NASA Distinguished Service Medal (1995)

Academic background
- Education: Princeton University (BSE); California Institute of Technology (MS, PhD)
- Thesis: Theory of laminar viscous-inviscid interactions in supersonic flow (1968)
- Doctoral advisor: Lester Lees

6th Director of Glenn Research Center
- In office May 29, 1987 – June 30, 1990
- Preceded by: Andrew J. Stofan
- Succeeded by: Lawrence J. Ross

7th Director of Goddard Space Flight Center
- In office July 1, 1990 – April 29, 1995
- Preceded by: John W. Townsend Jr.
- Succeeded by: Joseph H. Rothenberg

John Michael Klineberg (October 16, 1938 – December 31, 2022) was an American aerospace engineer and NASA official who directed two of the agency's field centers. He began his NASA career as a research engineer at the Ames Research Center in 1970 before moving to NASA Headquarters, where he helped develop the Aircraft Energy Efficiency Program, a federal effort to reduce aviation fuel consumption after the 1973 oil crisis.

He became deputy director of NASA's Lewis Research Center in 1979 and served as its sixth director from 1987 to 1990. Under Klineberg, the center expanded its space portfolio, reactivated test facilities at Plum Brook Station, and helped establish the Ohio Aerospace Institute. In 1990, he was appointed the seventh director of Goddard Space Flight Center, arriving just as the newly launched Hubble Space Telescope was found to have a flawed primary mirror. He oversaw the recovery effort that led to the telescope's repair during the 1993 STS-61 servicing mission, which was awarded the Collier Trophy, and later managed the Cosmic Background Explorer. Klineberg retired from NASA in 1995 and received the NASA Distinguished Service Medal, the agency's highest honor.

After leaving NASA, Klineberg joined Space Systems/Loral, where he led the development and deployment of the Globalstar satellite telephone constellation and served as company president from 1999 to 2001. He later became CEO of Swales Aerospace and advised the federal government through the National Research Council, chairing a panel on NASA's aeronautics research and serving on a committee that studied options for extending the life of the Hubble Space Telescope.

== Early life and education ==
Klineberg was born in Scarsdale, New York in 1938 as the middle child of Selma and Otto Klineberg, who were Jewish. His father was a Canadian social psychologist who conducted pioneering research on the intelligence of white and black students in the American South during the 1930s. In 1954, Otto presented evidence against scientific racism as an expert witness for the Supreme Court, helping to sway the landmark Brown v. Board of Education case that struck down racial segregation in American schools. Otto's work shaped Klineberg's interest in the relationship between science and public life, and he later pursued graduate study in both aeronautics and political science.

He attended Princeton University, graduating with a Bachelor of Science in engineering in 1960. Klineberg joined Grumman and the Douglas Aircraft Company as an engineer before enrolling at the California Institute of Technology. He received financial support from Douglas from 1961 to 1963 and graduated with a Master of Science in 1962. He earned a Ph.D. in aeronautics and political science from Caltech in 1968. His doctoral research on fluid dynamics developed a theoretical method for predicting how laminar boundary layers, the thin regions of slow-moving air that form along a surface, interact with external supersonic flow, a problem relevant to drag and heat transfer on supersonic aircraft and was funded by the Air Force Office of Scientific Research. His thesis is maintained in the archive of the Defense Technical Information Center.

== Career ==
=== Early years ===
After leaving Caltech, Klineberg joined NASA's Ames Research Center as a research engineer in aeronautics in 1970. He cited President John F. Kennedy's 1962 "We choose to go to the Moon" speech at Rice University as an inspiration.

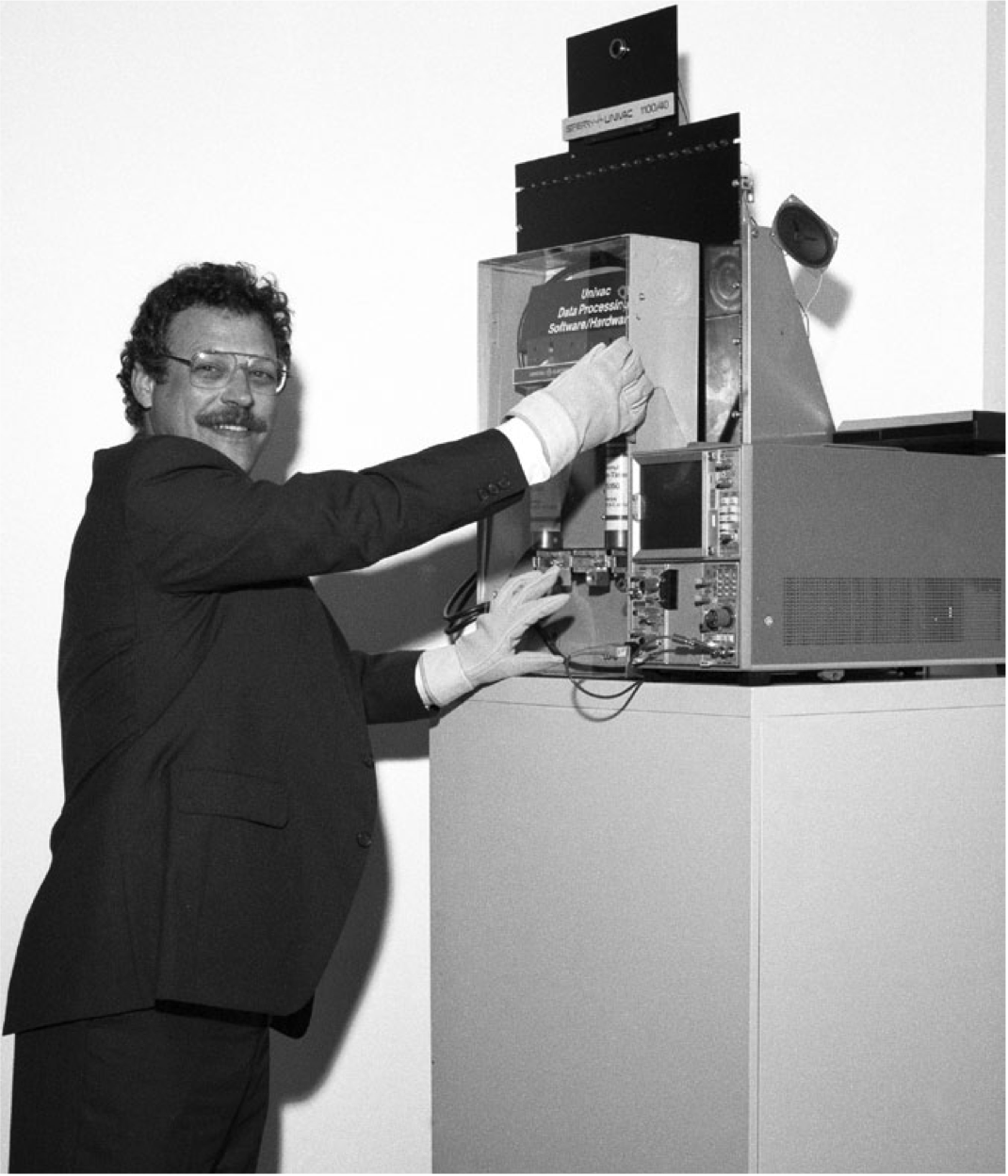
Klineberg with UNIVAC computer

At Ames, he conducted computational research into the behavior of airflow near the surface of aircraft at transonic speed, studying the separation behavior of boundary layers using numerical methods. Four years later, he joined NASA Headquarters to head the Low-Speed Aircraft Branch and was later appointed deputy associate administrator of the Office of Aeronautics and Space Technology (OAST).

In early 1975, Klineberg was a "key member" of a program that represented one of the largest coordinated fuel conservation efforts ever attempted in the United States. He served on the Aircraft Fuel Conservation Technology Task Force (the "Kramer Committee"), a 15-member NASA body established by Associate Administrator Alan M. Lovelace in response to the 1973 oil crisis.

Directed by James J. Kramer, a colleague at OAST, Klineberg later "recalled how closely it listened to the needs of industry". The central thesis was that high-risk technology development would be unlikely to be pursued by industry alone, and that federal investment was required to address the externality. The committee developed a 6-point plan to improve aircraft efficiency by developing advanced turboprops, aerodynamic drag reduction, and laminar flow control. Independent economic analysis projected that the resulting Aircraft Energy Efficiency (ACEE) program would save the equivalent of 677,500 barrels of oil per day. As chief of the Aerodynamics and Active Controls Branch, he testified to Congress about the Aircraft Energy Efficiency Program in September 1976.

=== Lewis Research Center ===
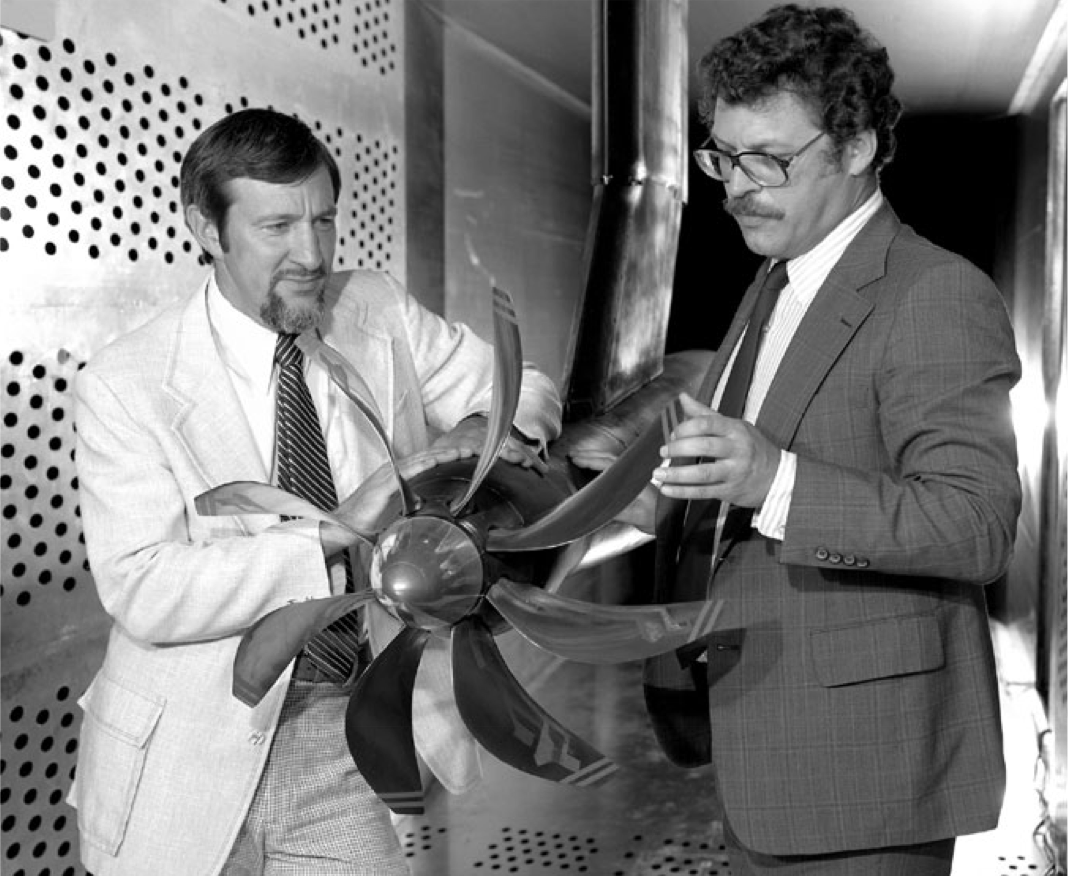
Andrew J. Stofan (left) and Klineberg (right) with an Advanced Turboprop model at NASA's Lewis Research Center (1983)

On July 1, 1979, Klineberg moved to Lewis Research Center in Cleveland, Ohio, becoming deputy director under John F. McCarthy Jr. Over the next seven years, he oversaw the center's research portfolio, initially concentrated in aeropropulsion and Earth resources, which expanded in the early 1980s as Lewis took on the Space Station Freedom electrical power system and worked to adapt the Centaur upper stage for launch aboard the Space Shuttle.

Before Andrew J. Stofan's departure in September 1986, Klineberg took charge of Lewis as acting director beginning June 30 of that year. He restructured the center that November to match its growing share of space projects, launched a strategic planning effort building on a 1982 predecessor, and obtained funding to build the Power Systems Facility for the center's space power work. NASA made the appointment permanent on May 29, 1987, naming him the center's sixth director. His tenure saw continued development of the space station power system, the Advanced Communications Technology Satellite, and the Advanced Turboprop Project.

In September 1989, Lewis oversaw the last flight of a NASA-managed expendable launch vehicle, closing out a run of launches that reached back to the Thor-Able in 1958 and shifting the agency toward buying launch services from commercial providers.

Under Klineberg, Lewis also brought several inactive test facilities at Plum Brook Station back into service. The remote site had been shut down in 1973 amid agency-wide cutbacks, but a 1985 multi-agency commission recommended reviving four of its facilities; the Space Power Facility, the Space Propulsion Research Facility, and the Cryogenic Tank Facility returned to operation between 1987 and 1990, with the Hypersonic Tunnel Facility following in 1996.

In 1989, he arranged the transfer of eight acres of NASA land to an aerospace consortium to establish the Ohio Aerospace Institute (OAI) in an effort to improve the center's ties with industry, universities, and the military. Conceived as a public–private consortium, the OAI brought together nine Ohio universities, Lewis, the Wright Laboratory, and private firms and was opened in 1992. NASA hoped the arrangement would draw more aerospace business to Ohio and speed the transfer of technology from university and federal laboratories into commercial development.

=== Goddard Space Flight Center ===
NASA announced in April 1990 that Klineberg would depart on June 30, 1990, to lead Goddard Space Flight Center as its seventh director. Upon arriving at Goddard, Klineberg immediately faced two crises in parallel. The Hubble Space Telescope, deployed in April 1990, had been found within weeks to carry a severe flaw in its primary mirror: a spherical aberration that left the instrument unable to produce sharp images and drew widespread public ridicule of NASA. Simultaneously, the center's Geostationary Operational Environmental Satellite (GOES) program was in serious trouble after engineers discovered another flaw in the newest GOES instrument package, leaving the United States dependent on a single aging satellite for weather coverage while a replacement remained grounded.

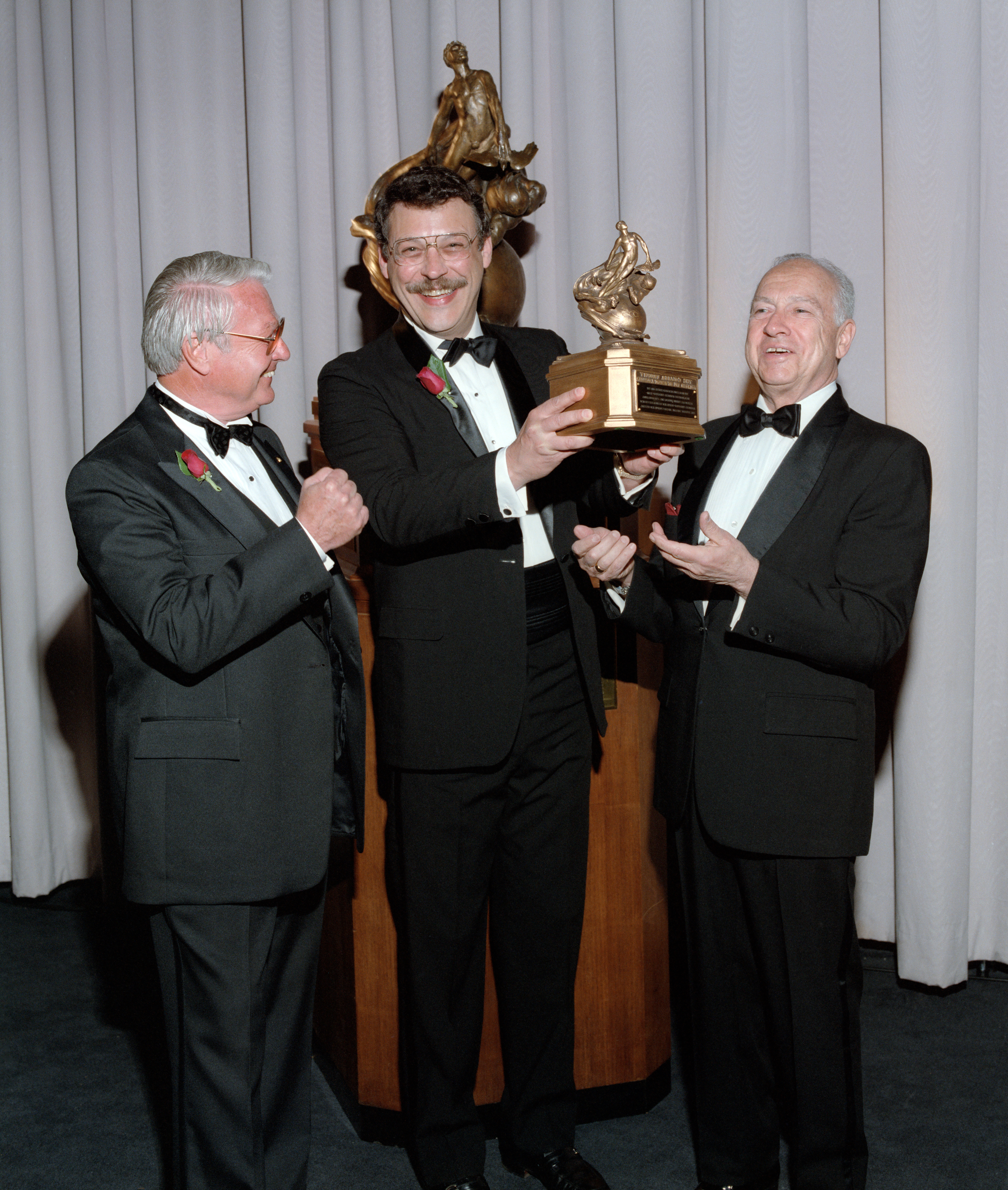
Klineberg accepts the Collier Trophy for NASA in 1988

To address the GOES program's difficulties, Klineberg recruited Rick Obenschain, a project manager with limited seniority, to take charge of the troubled program; Obenschain stabilized it and delivered the next-generation satellites successfully. On the Hubble front, Klineberg appointed Joseph H. Rothenberg as associate director for flight projects for the telescope. Rothenberg and project scientist Al Boggess then drew up a phased recovery strategy in which Goddard's teams would maximize what science could be done with the degraded instrument while developing the Corrective Optics Space Telescope Axial Replacement for installation during a planned 1993 servicing mission. As director, he also took part in the integrated mission simulations for the servicing flight, joining senior NASA managers in rehearsing how the agency's leadership would handle real-time crises during the repair. That mission, flown as STS-61 in December 1993, succeeded in restoring the telescope's optics and was awarded the Collier Trophy.

During his tenure, Goddard also served as managing center for the Cosmic Background Explorer (COBE), a project whose science team announced the detection of anisotropies in the cosmic microwave background radiation in April 1992, a finding that confirmed predictions of the Big Bang model and later formed the basis of the 2006 Nobel Prize in Physics. Klineberg retired from NASA on April 29, 1995.

=== Later life and legacy ===
He selected Lawrence J. Ross as his successor, having named him deputy director in 1987. He served in the position until retiring from the agency on April 29, 1995.

After departing from NASA, Klineberg joined Space Systems/Loral in 1995 as executive vice president and led the development, production, and orbital deployment of the Globalstar satellite constellation program. In 1999, he became president of the company and a vice president of its parent, Loral Space & Communications, and he remained on Space Systems/Loral's board of directors after retiring in 2001.

Testifying before the House Science Committee in 2005 as chairman of a National Research Council panel, Klineberg argued that NASA had been underinvesting in aeronautics. He urged the agency to preserve its test facilities and to fund fundamental research through stable, long-term commitments rather than short-term program budgets. The position echoed the rationale behind the Aircraft Energy Efficiency program, namely that high-risk aeronautics work required sustained federal support because industry alone would not undertake it.

In 2006, he became chief executive officer of Swales Aerospace, having previously served on its board of directors. He also served on a National Academy of Sciences committee studying maintaining the Hubble Space Telescope. Outside of his corporate positions, Klineberg served on the board of directors of the Charles Stark Draper Laboratory and on the National Research Council's Aeronautics and Space Engineering Board. He was also an honorary board member of the National Space Club and a member of the International Astronautical Federation.

Klineberg died in Davis, California on New Year's Eve, 2022, at the age of 84.

== Personal life ==
Klineberg married Anne-Marie, an émigrée originally from French North Africa, in 1967. They remained married until her death in 2004. He commuted to NASA in a Corvette Stingray each day until his retirement in 1990.

== Awards and honors ==
- NASA Distinguished Service Medal (1995)
- NASA Outstanding Leadership Medal
- NASA Goddard Award of Merit
- Presidential Rank Award of Distinguished Executive
- Presidential Rank Award of Meritorious Executive
- AIAA Barry M. Goldwater Education Award
- Engineer of the Year Award, University of Maryland
- Fellow of the American Institute of Aeronautics and Astronautics
- Fellow of the American Astronautical Society

== Gallery ==
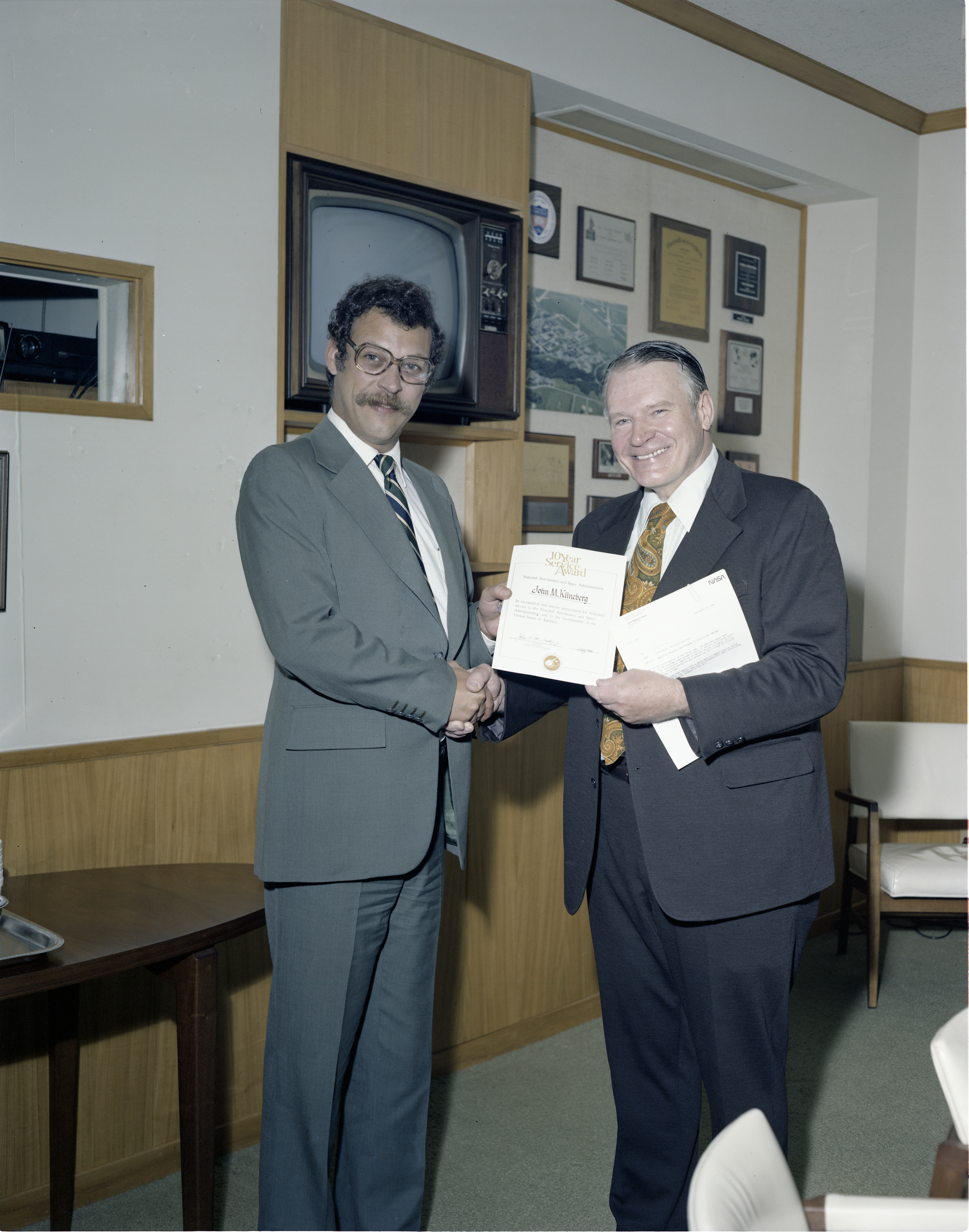
Director John F. McCarthy Jr. with deputy director Klineberg (1980)

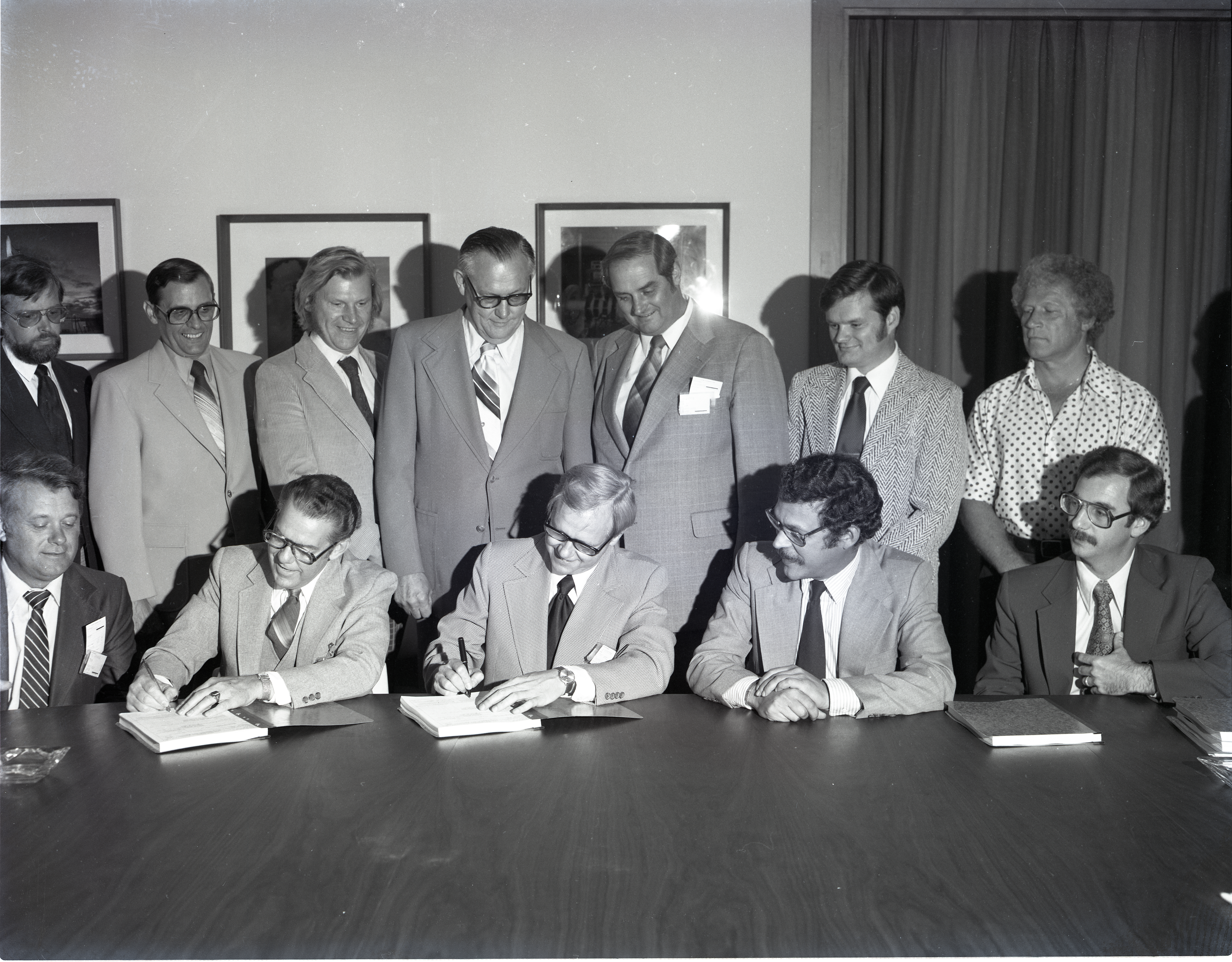
Klineberg signing a contract at Glenn Research Center (1980)

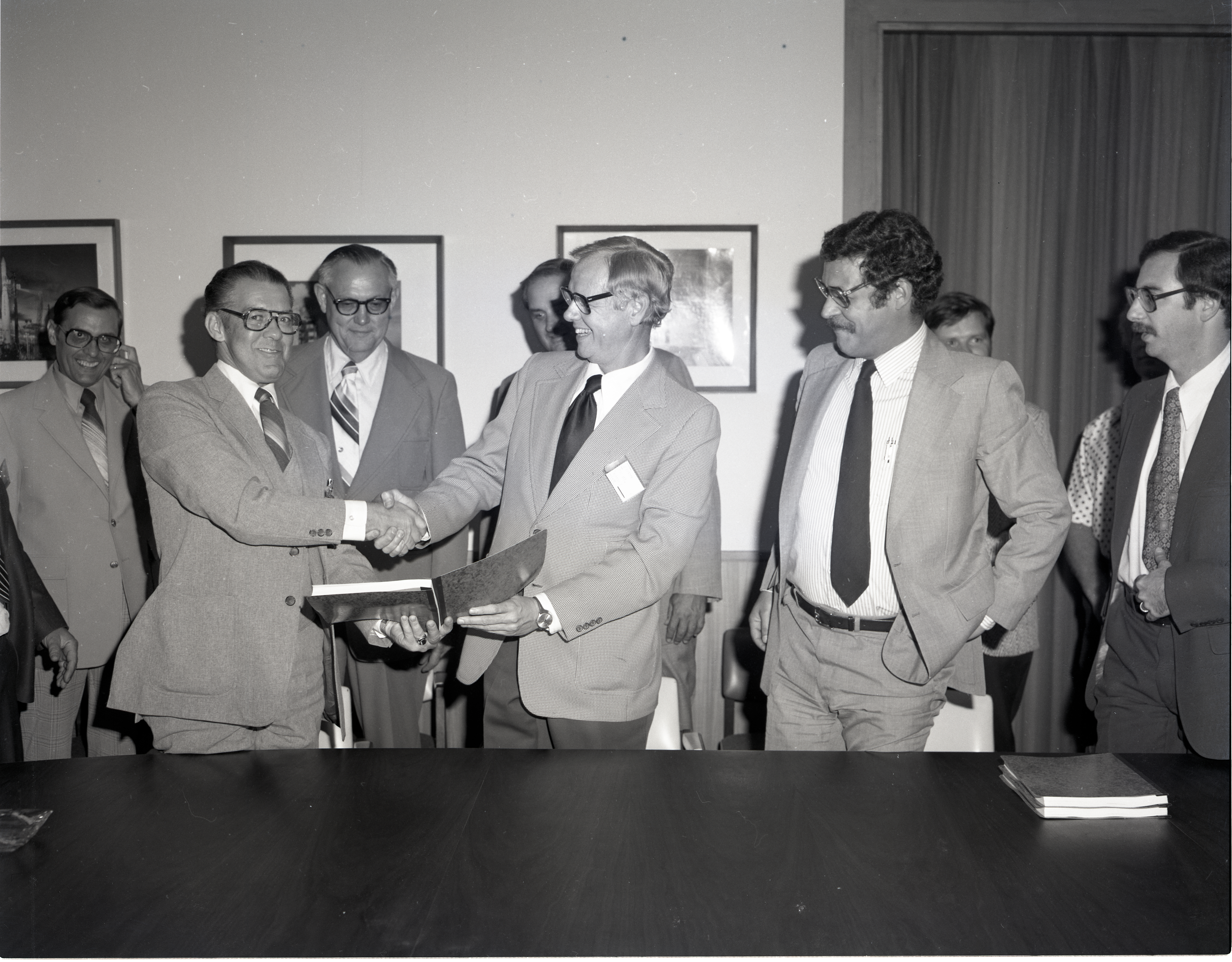
Handshake at contract signing ceremony (1980)
