= Alphonso V. Diaz =

American NASA official (born 20th century)

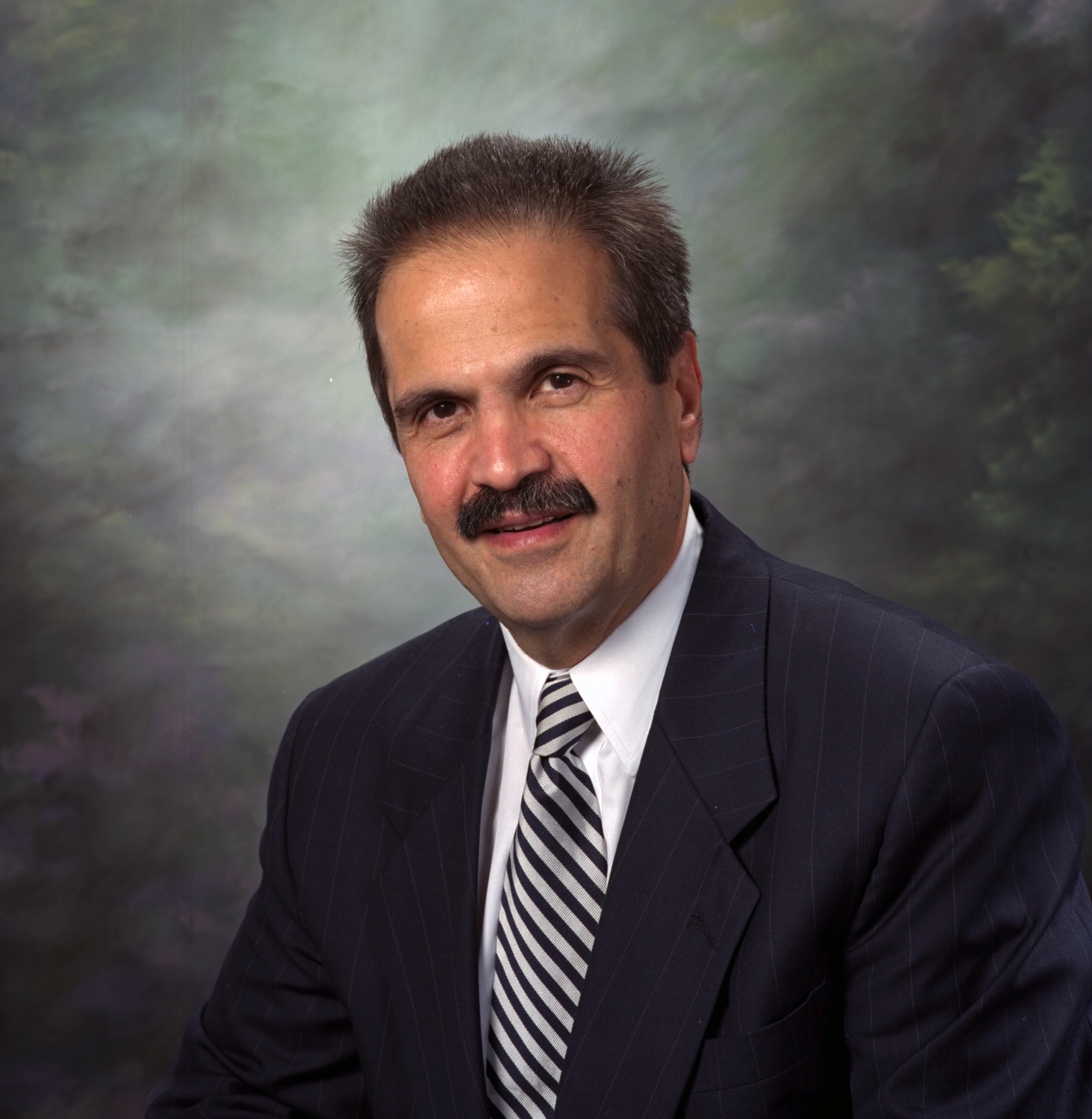
- Portrait in 2001
- Born: Brooklyn, New York City, U.S.
- Spouse: Angela Phillips Diaz
- Awards: NASA Distinguished Service Medal (2005)

Academic background
- Education: Saint Joseph's University (BS); Old Dominion University (MS); MIT Sloan School of Management (MS)

9th Director of Goddard Space Flight Center
- In office January 12, 1998 – August 2, 2004
- Preceded by: Joseph H. Rothenberg
- Succeeded by: Edward J. Weiler

NASA Associate Administrator for Science
- In office August 8, 2004 – August 12, 2005
- Preceded by: Edward J. Weiler (as Associate Administrator for Space Science)
- Succeeded by: Mary Cleave

Alphonso V. Diaz, known as Al Diaz, is an American public administrator and former NASA official who served as the ninth director of the Goddard Space Flight Center from 1998 to 2004 and as the agency's associate administrator for science from 2004 to 2005. He spent some four decades with the agency, beginning as a cooperative education student at the Langley Research Center in 1964.

At Langley, Diaz managed development of the gas chromatograph mass spectrometer carried by the Viking landers, the instrument that performed the first chemical analysis of Martian soil in 1976. He moved to NASA Headquarters in 1979, where he managed the International Solar Polar Mission (later Ulysses) and the Galileo mission to Jupiter, and later held senior posts in the Office of Space Science and Applications, including work on the scientific use of Space Station Freedom. After a year in industry with General Electric, he returned to headquarters and became deputy associate administrator and chief engineer for space science.

Diaz became deputy director of Goddard in 1996 and director in January 1998, a period during which the center reorganized its engineering workforce, launched the first spacecraft of the Earth Observing System, and conducted two Hubble servicing missions. After the loss of Columbia in 2003, administrator Sean O'Keefe asked him to lead an agency-wide review of the applicability of the Columbia Accident Investigation Board's findings; the resulting document, A Renewed Commitment to Excellence, became known as the Diaz report.

He retired from NASA in 2005 and afterwards held senior financial and administrative posts at the University of California, Riverside and Purdue University, and later Marymount University.

== Early life and education ==
Diaz was born and raised in Brooklyn, New York, to a Hispanic family and attended Regis High School in Manhattan. He enrolled at Saint Joseph's University in Philadelphia on a scholarship, and, needing further support to complete his studies, volunteered for a newly established cooperative education partnership between the university and NASA's Langley Research Center; he later credited the prospect of a NASA career with reversing a sharp early decline in his grades.

He received a Bachelor of Science in physics from Saint Joseph's and a Master of Science in physics from Old Dominion University in Norfolk, Virginia. In 1985, he was selected as a NASA Sloan Fellow and studied at the MIT Sloan School of Management, earning a Master of Science in management in 1986.

== NASA career ==
=== Langley Research Center and the Viking Project ===
Diaz joined Langley as a co-op student in 1964 and was assigned to the Instrument Research Division, where he worked on optical instrumentation—principally spectroscopy and radiometry—for the center's wind tunnels and shock tubes. He transferred to the Viking project in an engineering support role and rose through a series of assignments on its gas chromatograph mass spectrometer (GCMS), serving successively as instrument segment manager, systems engineer, development manager, and flight operations manager. Compressing a laboratory's worth of analytical chemistry apparatus into a compact flight instrument proved difficult enough that project management repeatedly questioned whether it could be delivered; the instrument was completed, and after the 1976 landings it returned the first chemical analysis of material on the surface of Mars. Diaz received a NASA Exceptional Scientific Achievement Medal for the work.

Following the end of the project, he spent about two years at Langley building a planning and cost-estimating organization within the center's Flight Projects Directorate.

=== NASA Headquarters ===
In 1979, Diaz moved to NASA Headquarters in Washington, D.C., initially as manager of mission planning in the planetary program office. He subsequently served as program manager for the International Solar Polar Mission, a joint venture with the European Space Agency that was scaled back when NASA cancelled its own spacecraft—a decision Diaz later described as an unanticipated diplomatic setback from which the partnership never fully recovered—and which eventually flew as the ESA-built Ulysses. He was also program manager for Galileo, manager of planetary advanced programs, and deputy director of the Solar System Exploration Division.

Diaz later served as assistant associate administrator for space station within the Office of Space Science and Applications (OSSA), an office created to secure a scientific constituency for Space Station Freedom, and afterwards directed space station evolution planning. He left the agency in 1988 for General Electric's aerospace business, returning about a year later at the invitation of associate administrator Lennard A. Fisk. From 1989 he was deputy associate administrator and chief engineer of the Office of Space Science, with oversight of flight program policy, launch vehicle requirements, and mission study reviews, and he chaired an agency committee that examined whether more of NASA's science should be managed through university-based institutes on the model of the Space Telescope Science Institute. He received a NASA Outstanding Leadership Medal in 1994 for his part in the first Hubble servicing mission.

=== Goddard Space Flight Center ===
Administrator Daniel Goldin appointed Diaz deputy director of the Goddard Space Flight Center in 1996; the choice was unusual in that his predecessors in the post had generally come up through the center itself. He became the center's ninth director on January 12, 1998, succeeding Joseph H. Rothenberg. In the role he directed the Earth science, space science, and technology programs assigned to Goddard and managed a budget of roughly $3 billion.

One of his first acts was a reorganization that withdrew engineering staff from the individual project and science organizations and consolidated them in a central engineering directorate, an arrangement intended to give engineering an independent voice and to impose consistent quality control on work delivered to projects. Diaz identified safety and the adoption of ISO 9001 process standards as center-wide priorities for 1998.

Goddard's flight program during his tenure included the Hubble Space Telescope servicing missions of December 1999 and March 2002, the launch of the first Earth Observing System platforms, and a series of astrophysics and heliophysics missions; O'Keefe wrote to Diaz in April 2002 to commend the center on the successful commissioning of the RHESSI solar observatory. The center also carried NASA's principal working relationship with the National Oceanic and Atmospheric Administration; Diaz later recalled persistent difficulties in developing instruments for the next generation of geostationary weather satellites and in the polar-orbiting program, including damage to a NOAA spacecraft at a contractor's factory. Under the agency's move to full cost accounting, begun while he was at Goddard, he pressed for arrangements in which every staff scientist devoted a defined share of effort to enabling other researchers' work rather than solely to independent research.

Diaz later described the directorship as the most enjoyable assignment of his career, and characterized his central challenge at Goddard as providing an environment in which unconventional scientific proposals could be aired. He was awarded NASA Outstanding Leadership Medals for his work at the center in 2002 and 2004 and an Exceptional Service Medal in 1999.

=== Diaz report ===
After the Columbia Accident Investigation Board published its findings on the loss of Columbia in August 2003, O'Keefe asked Diaz to lead a team examining which of the board's conclusions applied beyond the Space Shuttle program. The team, whose members O'Keefe selected from among senior field-center leaders, worked for roughly six months, holding leadership sessions, town-hall meetings, and confidential individual interviews across the agency. Its report, A Renewed Commitment to Excellence, was issued on January 30, 2004, and is commonly cited as the Diaz report.

The review concluded that the organizational patterns the board had criticized were not confined to human spaceflight but appeared at science centers as well, and it revisited the concept of the normalization of deviance raised after the Challenger accident. Participants told the team that some of NASA's formal review rituals, intended to discipline decision-making, had instead discouraged candid discussion in large meetings. Diaz afterwards judged the exercise valuable but thought parts of it had been read as criticism rather than as a record of what employees had said. The findings generated follow-on technical work across the agency, including a review of safety-factor policies and waivers.

=== Associate administrator for science ===
On August 8, 2004, Diaz was appointed associate administrator for science, effectively exchanging positions with Edward J. Weiler, who took over at Goddard. The post carried responsibility for NASA's science flight programs, mission studies, and technology development, a portfolio of about $5.5 billion, roughly a third of the agency budget, and institutional oversight of Goddard, the Ames Research Center, and the contract for the Jet Propulsion Laboratory.

His principal task was the consolidation of the separate Earth science and space science enterprises into a single Science Mission Directorate, undertaken amid the reorganization that followed the Vision for Space Exploration. Because the science community generally expected a working scientist in the position, Diaz appointed the Earth science program's leader, Ghassem Asrar, as his deputy to handle scientific selections. He later called the assignment the most difficult of his career, citing uncertainty over the directorate's eventual size and a change of administrators partway through.

A parallel controversy concerned the future of the Hubble Space Telescope. O'Keefe had cancelled the final shuttle servicing flight and proposed a robotic alternative developed at Goddard; a National Research Council committee chaired by Louis J. Lanzerotti concluded that the robotic mission could not be accomplished in the time or budget projected and recommended reinstating the shuttle mission. Administrator Michael D. Griffin subsequently approved a further shuttle servicing mission. Diaz, who had supported the robotic option, said he remained convinced it was feasible and regretted the loss of the outside interest it had attracted.

Diaz announced his retirement in June 2005 after his departure was reported in the press, stating in an internal memorandum that he had planned to leave the government once a new administrator was confirmed. He left NASA in August 2005 and received the NASA Distinguished Service Medal.

== Later career ==
In late 2005 University of California, Riverside chancellor France Córdova—a former NASA chief scientist who had earlier worked with Diaz on the science institutes study—selected him as vice chancellor for administration, a post overseeing roughly 600 staff in areas including physical plant, human resources, financial services, police services, and environmental health and safety.

When Córdova became president of Purdue University, Diaz followed her there, taking office on July 1, 2009, as executive vice president for business and finance and treasurer, the university's chief financial officer. He was responsible for an operating budget that reached about $2.4 billion and oversaw financial affairs, business and human resource services, physical facilities, auxiliary enterprises, internal audit, and—jointly with the provost—information technology. He served under Córdova and her successor, Mitch Daniels, who as director of the Office of Management and Budget had earlier initiated the full-cost accounting reforms Diaz worked through at NASA.

In December 2013, Diaz was named treasurer and chief financial officer of Marymount University in Arlington, Virginia, citing the opportunity to live closer to family. He has since served on the advisory council of the Krach Institute for Tech Diplomacy at Purdue.

== Personal life ==
Diaz is married to Angela Phillips Diaz. The couple resides in Takoma Park, Maryland.

== Awards and honors ==
- NASA Exceptional Scientific Achievement Medal, for work on the Viking Project
- Presidential Rank Award of Meritorious Executive (1990, 1995, and 2002 or 2003) (Note: NASA's biography dates the third Meritorious Executive award to 2003; Old Dominion University gives 2002.)
- NASA Outstanding Leadership Medal (1994, 2002, 2004)
- Presidential Rank Award of Distinguished Executive (1996)
- NASA Exceptional Service Medal (1999)
- Honorary Doctor of Science, Capitol College (2004)
- NASA Distinguished Service Medal (2005)
- Honorary doctorate in aerospace engineering, University of Rome (2005)
- Wernher von Braun Space Flight Trophy, National Space Club of Huntsville (2005)
- Associate Fellow of the American Institute of Aeronautics and Astronautics
