= West Moreton Youth Detention Centre =

Youth detention centre in Queensland, Australia

The West Moreton Youth Detention Centre is a youth detention centre at Wacol in Ipswich, Queensland, Australia. It has a capacity of 32 detainees.

Each cell contains a bed, toilet, shower, desk and a shelf. Bedding and toiletries are supplied. Each child is given breakfast, morning tea, lunch, afternoon tea and dinner. Phone calls of up to 10 minutes at a time totaling 120 minutes of call time each week are permitted.

Children are assigned a caseworker. Youth detention centres in Queensland have an education and training centre, which detainees are required to participate in five days a week.

== See also ==
- Punishment in Australia
