= Constituent services in the United States =

Direct services provided by elected officials

Constituent services in the United States refer to services provided directly, on an individual basis, to voters by their state and federal elected officials and staff. Members of the United States Congress, in addition to state legislatures, can choose how and to what extent they provide constituent services. In general, these services are provided to help constituents navigate state and federal systems, agencies, and regulations. Privacy release forms often need to be signed to allow the office of a congressperson or state legislator to work on a person's behalf.

== Background ==
Members of Congress and their caseworkers can help people access federal services and resources. Constituent services are also referred to as casework. Constituent services often starts with a member of the Congressperson's office opening a case for the constituent. In many cases, people need to sign a privacy release form to allow a congressperson's office to work on someone's behalf.

According to Kristin Nicholson, writing for The Government Affairs Institute, many voters do not remember how their member of Congress voted on a bill over a time but do remember how their constituent services helped them. For example, former chair of the Maine Democratic Party, Bev Uhlenhake, said Susan Collins had been difficult to defeat due to the constituent services she had provided to the residents of Maine.

Members of Congress decide how to provide constituent services. Oftentimes, constituents communicate with the office of the member of Congress to request constituent services. The most common types of constituent services are providing information regarding the federal government, assistance with a federal agency, and grants work.

== History ==
After requests for assistance with matters regarding the federal government, including Revolutionary War pensions, the House of Representatives established a select committee to address claims in 1794 and the Senate in 1816.

In 2022, the Select Committee on Congressional Modernization requested an optional anonymized system to recognize trends in casework to identify issues. On September 9, 2025, the House Digital Services released a system called Case Compass, which was similar to what the Select Committee on Congressional Modernization requested.
