= Elizabeth Duke =

Elizabeth Duke may refer to:

- Elizabeth Ashburn Duke (born 1952), member of the Board of Governors of the Federal Reserve System
- Elizabeth Ann Duke (born 1940), American radical activist
- Elizabeth Duke (administrator), former administrator for the Health Resources and Services Administration (HRSA)
- Elizabeth Duke (author), pen name of Vivienne Wallington
- Elizabeth Duke, a brand owned by Argos, formerly used for its jewellery range
