= Joseph H. Rothenberg =

American aerospace engineer (born 1941)

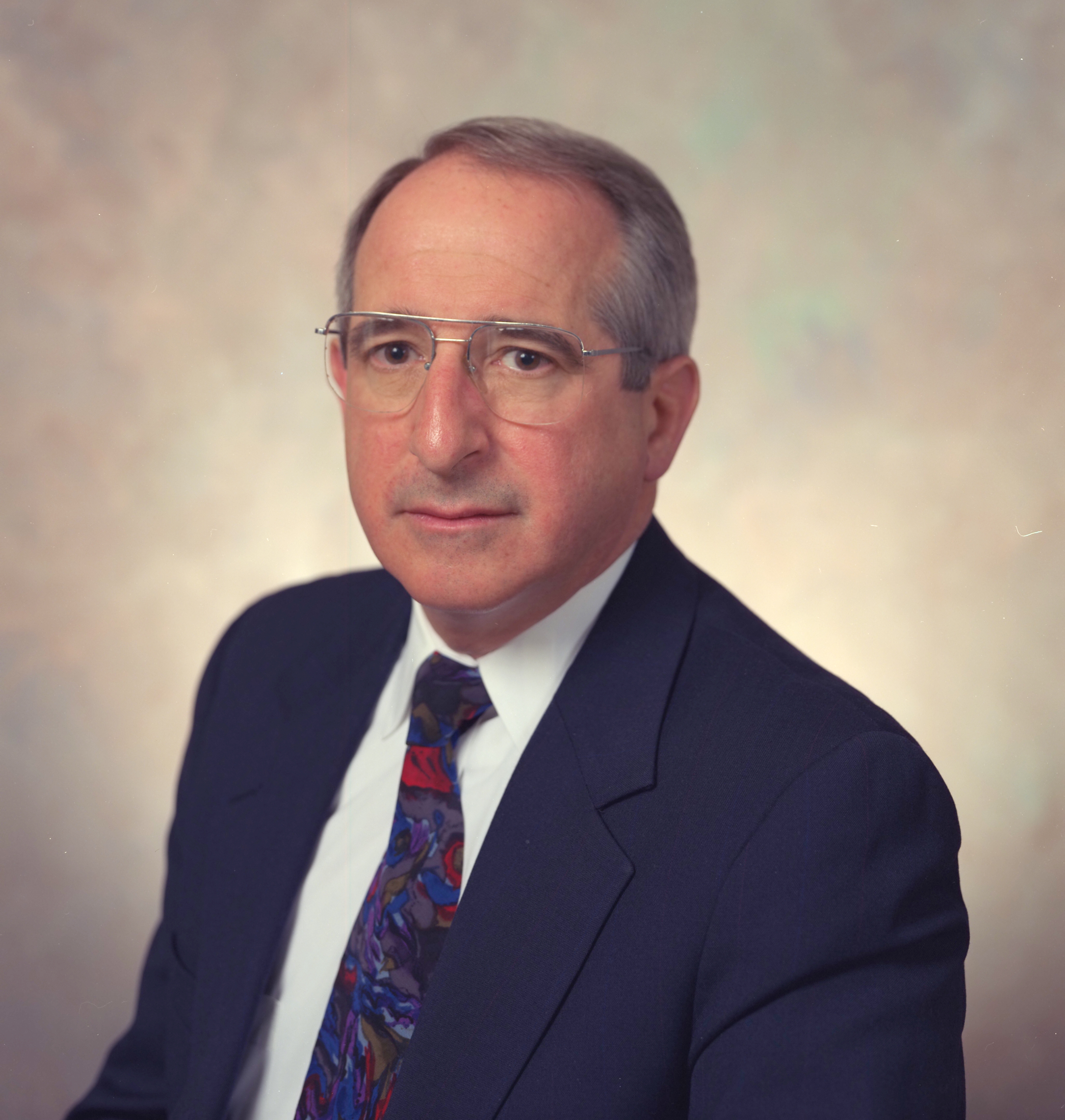
- Portrait in 1995

Associate Administrator for Space Flight of NASA
- In office January 1998 – December 15, 2001
- Preceded by: Wilbur C. Trafton
- Succeeded by: Frederick D. Gregory

8th Director of Goddard Space Flight Center
- In office October 4, 1995 – January 12, 1998
- Preceded by: John M. Klineberg
- Succeeded by: Alphonse V. Diaz

Personal details
- Born: c. 1941
- Education: SUNY Agricultural and Technical Institute at Farmingdale (AAS); C. W. Post College (BS, MS)
- Occupation: Aerospace engineer, executive
- Awards: Collier Trophy (1993); NASA Distinguished Service Medal (1994, 2000)

Joseph H. Rothenberg (born c. 1941) is an American aerospace engineer and former NASA official. He is best known for leading the recovery of the Hubble Space Telescope after the discovery of a flaw in its primary mirror. As associate director of flight projects for Hubble at Goddard Space Flight Center, he directed the project through the 1993 servicing mission that corrected the telescope's optics, work that earned the Hubble team the Collier Trophy and brought him wide recognition.

He later served as the eighth director of Goddard from 1995 to 1998 and as NASA's associate administrator for space flight from 1998 until his retirement from the agency in 2001, a period during which assembly of the International Space Station began.

Rothenberg began his career at Grumman Aerospace in 1964 and spent nearly six decades in the field, working across government, aerospace industry, and the emerging commercial space sector. After leaving NASA, he held executive and advisory roles at Universal Space Network, Skybox Imaging, and Google's Terra Bella, and served on several corporate and scientific boards.

== Early life and education ==
Rothenberg was born around 1941. Before his engineering career, he served in the United States Navy, during which he was stationed in Florida near Cape Canaveral. An admirer of the early space program, he attempted to watch John Glenn's 1962 orbital launch in person but missed the successful attempt after two scrubs.

He earned an associate degree in applied science in electrical technology from the State University of New York Agricultural and Technical Institute at Farmingdale, graduating in 1964, and credited the school with launching his career. He went on to receive a Bachelor of Science in engineering science and a Master of Science in engineering management from C. W. Post College of Long Island University. He was later awarded an honorary doctorate in engineering from the Stevens Institute of Technology in 1997 and an honorary doctorate of science from C. W. Post in 2000.

== Career ==
=== Grumman and industry ===
Rothenberg joined Grumman Aerospace in 1964, beginning a 17-year tenure during which he held project engineering and management positions in hardware development, systems engineering, and the testing and operations of spacecraft, aircraft, and submersible research vehicles. He managed the development and operation of the aerospace ground equipment for Goddard's Orbiting Astronomical Observatory series of satellites, a program under which four spacecraft were launched and which included early studies of on-orbit satellite servicing concepts that later informed the approach to maintaining Hubble. He became staff project engineer and later the director of engineering for test and operations before serving as project manager for Goddard's Solar Maximum Mission.

From 1981 to 1983, he was executive vice president of the Space Systems Division of Computer Technology Associates, Inc. (CTA), in McLean, Virginia, where he managed ground-test and operations systems engineering projects that included the Hubble Space Telescope, the Solar Maximum repair mission, and space tracking and data system architecture studies.

=== Goddard Space Flight Center and Hubble ===
Rothenberg joined Goddard Space Flight Center in 1983 as operations manager for the Hubble Space Telescope, leading the NASA team responsible for developing and conducting the telescope's orbital operations. In April 1987 he was appointed chief of Goddard's Mission Operations Division, and in September 1989 deputy director of the Mission Operations and Data Systems Directorate.

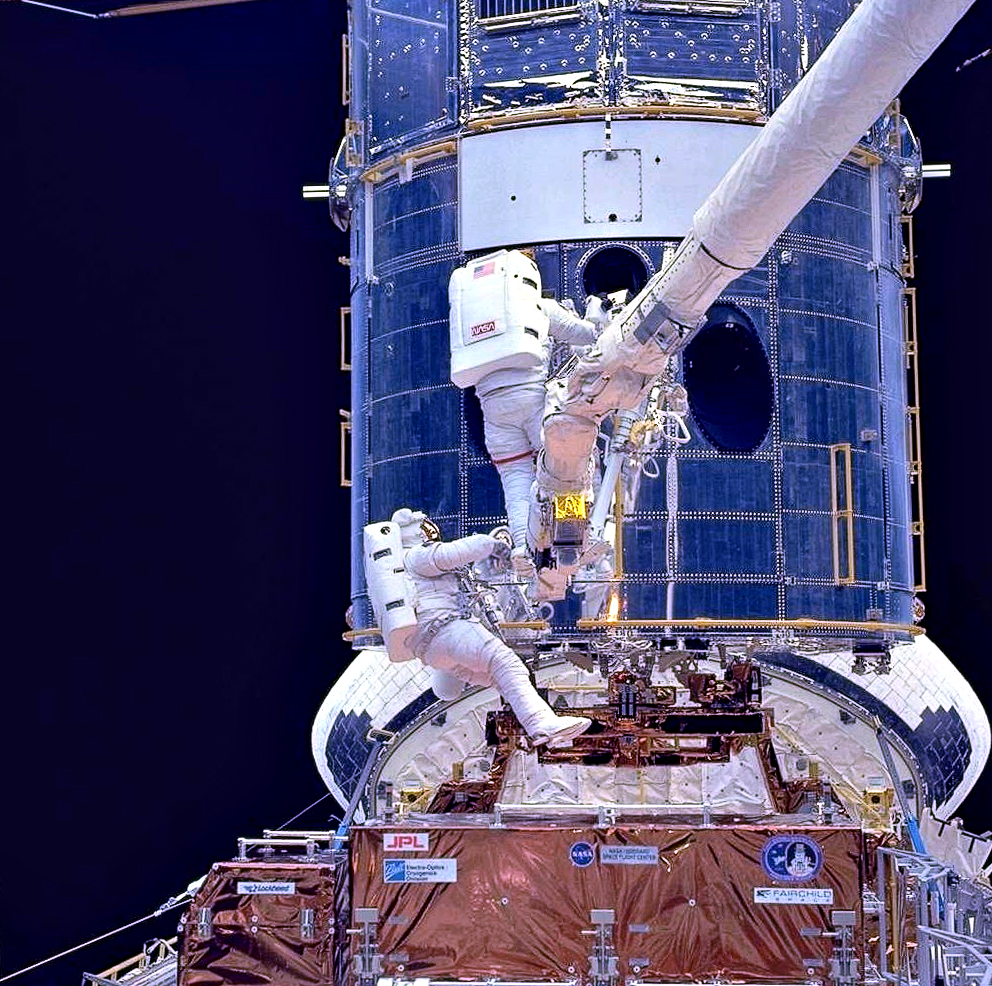
Astronauts Story Musgrave and Jeffrey A. Hoffman install corrective optics during the STS-61 mission

In 1990 he was named associate director of flight projects for Hubble, taking charge of the project just as the newly launched telescope was found to carry a spherical aberration in its primary mirror that prevented it from producing sharp images and drew widespread public criticism of NASA. The mirror was flatter than intended, by a measure of 2 micrometers, or 1/40th the thickness of a human hair. Appointed to the role by Goddard director John M. Klineberg, Rothenberg and project scientist Al Boggess developed a phased recovery strategy under which Goddard's teams extracted what science they could from the degraded instrument while preparing the Corrective Optics Space Telescope Axial Replacement (COSTAR) for installation. An optical element with a "reverse prescription" to the flatness was made to correct the aberration. The repair was carried out on the STS-61 mission in December 1993, which restored the telescope's optical performance, and the achievement was recognized with the Collier Trophy. Rothenberg's direction of the effort, which took roughly three years to complete, brought him national and international recognition.

After the servicing mission, he again left the agency, serving from February 1994 to April 1995 as executive vice president of CTA's Space Systems Division before rejoining NASA. On October 4, 1995, he was named the eighth director of Goddard Space Flight Center, succeeding Klineberg. In interviews, he described his tenure as director in terms of institutional change, including a reorganization of the center, revisions to its spacecraft procurement processes, and a restructuring of the promotion system to improve the center's objectives.

=== Associate Administrator for Space Flight ===
In January 1998, Rothenberg moved to NASA Headquarters as associate administrator for space flight, taking charge of NASA's human exploration and development of space. He was responsible for setting policy and direction for the Space Shuttle and International Space Station programs, space communications, and expendable launch services, and for oversight of the Johnson Space Center, Kennedy Space Center, Stennis Space Center, and Marshall Space Flight Center. His tenure coincided with the start of on-orbit assembly of the International Space Station in 1998 and the beginning of continuous human operations aboard the station, and his work included negotiating launch schedules and managing international partnerships, particularly with Russia.

During this period, NASA flew STS-95 in October 1998, on which John Glenn returned to space at the age of 77. Rothenberg, who had tried and failed to see Glenn's first launch decades earlier, took part in the announcement of the flight and afterward pinned the NASA Space Flight Medal on Glenn, an occasion he called the highlight of his career.

Rothenberg announced his retirement from NASA in October 2001, effective December 15 of that year. Administrator Daniel S. Goldin credited him with helping to complete the first phase of the space station's construction and to lay the groundwork for the international project.

=== Commercial space career ===
After leaving NASA, Rothenberg became active in the commercial space industry. From 2002 he was president and a member of the board of directors of Universal Space Network, a company providing commercial ground-station and satellite-tracking services. He later worked with the Earth-imaging startup Skybox Imaging, serving as a director of its research and operations, and continued in that area after Google acquired the company in 2014 and renamed it Terra Bella, where he was director of engineering and operations.

He served on the board of directors of Paragon Space Development Corporation and was associated with the venture firm Deep Venture Partners; he was also recognized for executive and technical roles in the growth and sale of both Universal Space Network and Skybox Imaging. By his account his working career in aerospace spanned nearly six decades before his retirement around 2021.

== Awards and honors ==
- NASA Exceptional Service Medal (1990)
- Collier Trophy, as a member of the Hubble first-servicing-mission team (1993)
- NASA Distinguished Service Medal (1994, 2000)
- National Space Club Goddard Memorial (Nelson P. Jackson) Award (1994)
- NASA Outstanding Leadership Medal (1995, 2001)
- Senior Executive Service Presidential Rank Meritorious Executive Award (1995, 2001)
- Presidential Rank Distinguished Executive Award (1997)
- AIAA Goddard Astronautics Award
- Inducted into the Smithsonian Aviation Week & Space Technology Hall of Fame
- Honorary Doctorate of Engineering, Stevens Institute of Technology (1997)
- Honorary Doctorate of Science, C. W. Post College (2000)

Rothenberg is a member of the American Institute of Aeronautics and Astronautics and a past president of the Long Island Section of the Instrument Society of America. He is a lifetime associate member of the National Academy of Sciences–National Research Council.
