= Reda R. Mankbadi =

Egyptian-American engineer and scientist

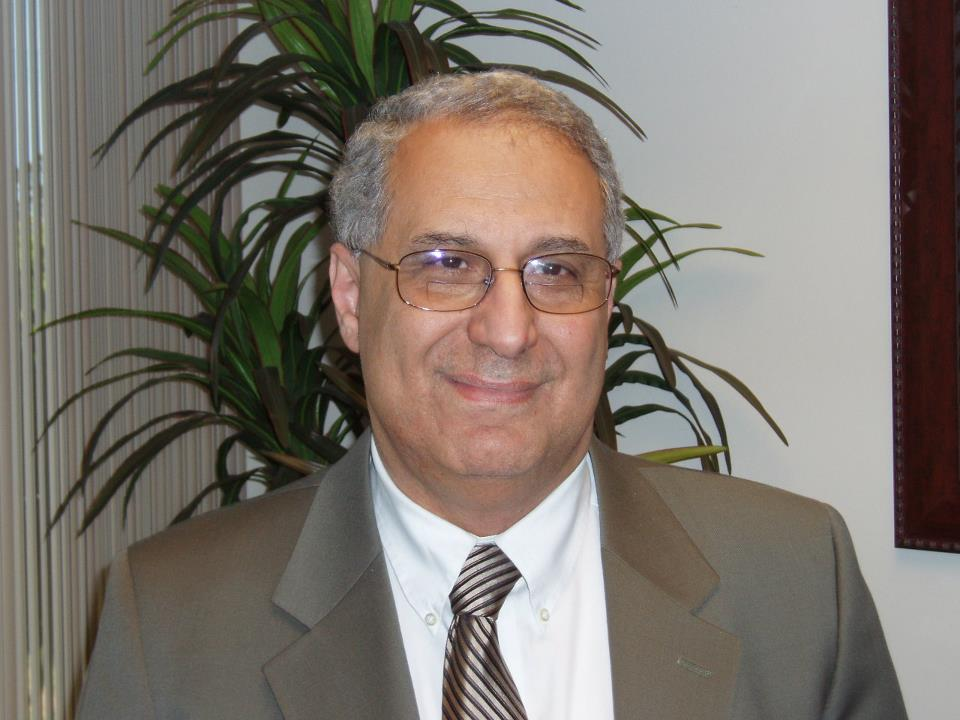
- Citizenship: Egyptian, American
- Occupations: Dean of Engineering, professor and scientist
- Spouse: Eiman Gaballah (m. 1982)
- Children: 4

Academic background
- Education: Cairo University (BS); Brown University (PhD)

Academic work
- Main interests: Aeroacoustics, turbulence, energy

Reda R. Mankbadi is an Egyptian-American scientist, who is the founding Dean of the Engineering College at Embry-Riddle Aeronautical University. He is a former NASA senior scientist at NASA's Glenn Research Center and a Fellow of the NASA Lewis Research Academy. Mankbadi has published over 150 scientific papers.

== Early life and education ==
Mankbadi grew up in a Coptic Christian household between Cairo and Upper Egypt. He first attended Franciscan Catholic School but then transferred to public schools. He received a BS degree in Engineering from Cairo University.

Mankbadi earned his PhD in engineering from Brown University in 1979.

== Career ==
Early in his career, Mankbadi served as a professor at Cairo University and Rutgers University. While teaching at Rutgers University, Mankbadi received the Rutgers University Faculty Merit Fellowship for Excellence in Teaching in 1984. Mankbadi was a Fulbright scholar in 1986. In 1986, he also served as a Visiting Associate Professor at Brown University. In the following year, he served as a Visiting Associate Professor at the University of Karlsruhe in Germany.

In 1988, Mankbadi was awarded the Presidential Medal of Science and Arts of the First Order in Egypt.

Eventually, Mankbadi served as a senior scientist at NASA's Glenn Research Center. He was also appointed a fellow of the NASA Lewis Research Academy in 1990. He then became an Affiliated Professor at the Ohio Aerospace Institute. From 1996 to 1999, Mankbadi was named an Ohio Board of Regents Professor.

Mankbadi became the Founding Dean of the Engineering College at Embry-Riddle Aeronautical University in 2002. He continues to serve at Embry-Riddle as a distinguished professor of aeronautical engineering.

In 2008, Mankbadi co-founded the Florida Center for Advanced Aero-Propulsion (FCAAP), which was established by Embry-Riddle Aeronautical University in collaboration with Florida State University, the University of Central Florida, and the University of Florida. He currently serves as the ERAU director for FCAAP.

== Research ==
Most of Mankbadi's research focuses on the areas of propulsion, turbulence, aeroacoustics, and energy. He has developed a theory for the coherent structures in turbulent flows, and has led the NASA's development of computational aeroacoustics.

Mankbadi has also developed computation tools such as Hi-Fidelity Large-Eddy-Simulations for simulating turbulence and aeroacoustics.

Mankbadi has served as an associate editor for scholarly journals such as the International Journal of Aeroacoustics, the Journal of Energy Resources, and the Journal of Turbulence.

Mankbadi is included in the top 2% of world scientists for career scholarly impact in a study by Stanford University.

== Memberships and affiliations ==
- Fellow, NASA Lewis Research Academy, 1990
- Elected Fellow, American Society of Mechanical Engineers, 1993

== Scholarships ==
- Fulbright Program, 1986

== Awards ==
- Presidential Medal (Egypt) of Science and Arts of the First Order, 1988
- NASA Superior Performance Award, 1990, 1993

== Selected publications ==
- Mankbadi, Reda R. (1992-06-01). "Dynamics and Control of Coherent Structure in Turbulent Jets". Applied Mechanics Reviews. 45 (6). ASME International: 219–248. Bibcode:1992ApMRv..45..219M. doi:10.1115/1.3121398. ISSN 0003-6900.
- Mankbadi, Reda; Hayder, M.; Povinelli, Louis (1993-01-11). "The structure of supersonic jet flow and its radiated sound". 31st Aerospace Sciences Meeting. Reston, Virginia: American Institute of Aeronautics and Astronautics. doi:10.2514/6.1993-549.
- Mankbadi, R. R., Hixon, R., Shih, S. H., & Povinelli, L. A. (1998). Use of linearized Euler equations for supersonic jet noise prediction. AIAA Journal, 36(2), 140-147.
- Mankbadi, R., & Liu, J. T. C. (1984). Sound generated aerodynamically revisited: large-scale structures in a turbulent jet as a source of sound. Philosophical Transactions of the Royal Society of London. Series A, Mathematical and Physical Sciences, 311(1516), 183-217.
- Mankbadi, R. R. (1986). On the interaction between fundamental and subharmonic instability waves in a turbulent round jet. Journal of Fluid Mechanics 160, 385-419.
- Mankbadi, Reda R. (1991). "Multifrequency excited jets". Physics of Fluids A: Fluid Dynamics. 3 (4). AIP Publishing: 595–605. Bibcode:1991PhFlA...3..595M. doi:10.1063/1.858121. ISSN 0899-8213.
- Mankbadi, RR, Wu, X, Lee, SS (1993). A critical-layer analysis of the resonant triad in boundary-layer transition: nonlinear interactions. Journal of Fluid Mechanics 256, 85-106.
- Mankbadi, RR (2013). Transition, turbulence, and noise: Theory and applications for scientists and engineers. Springer Science & Business Media.
