= Noel Hinners =

American geologist and soil chemist

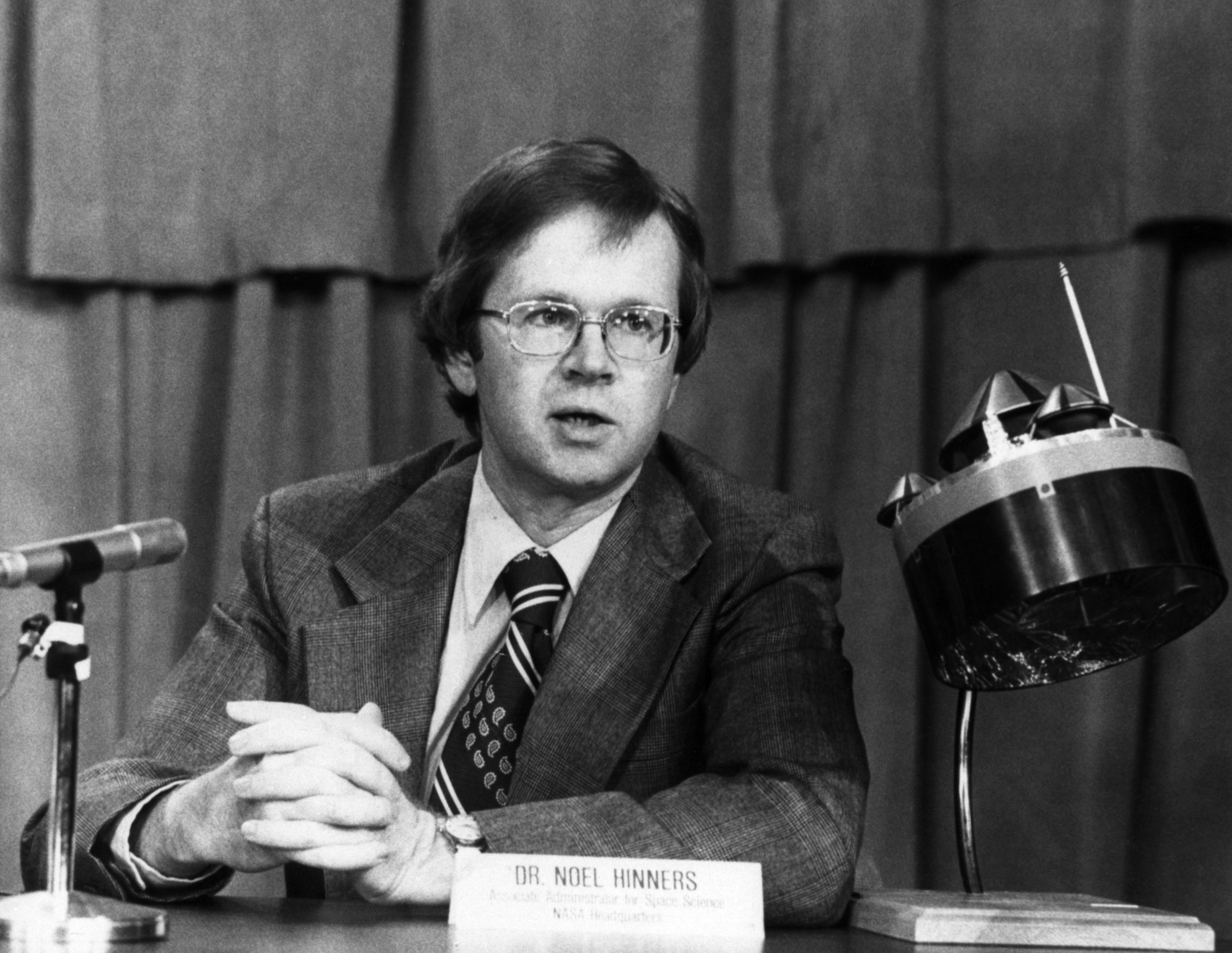
- Dr. Noel W. Hinners
- Born: 25 December 1935; Brooklyn
- Died: 5 September 2014 (aged 78); Littleton
- Alma mater: Rutgers University; California Institute of Technology; Princeton University
- Awards: NASA Distinguished Service Medal (1977, 1981, 1979)
- Academic career
- Fields: Space exploration, geology
- Institutions: Bellcomm (1963–1972); NASA (1972–1979); National Air and Space Museum (1979–1982); Goddard Space Flight Center (1982–1987); NASA (1987–1989); Martin Marietta (1989–2002)
- Position held: NASA Chief Scientist (1987–1989)

Noel William Hinners (December 25, 1935 – September 5, 2014) was an American geologist and soil chemist who is primarily remembered for his work with NASA where he worked in a variety of scientific and administrative roles from 1963 to 1989, including two years as NASA Chief Scientist. In 1977 he was awarded the NASA Distinguished Service Medal.

At NASA Hinners helped plan and execute the Apollo program and was also responsible for the successful launches of numerous scientific probes into space; achieving such notable objectives as the first retrieval of Moon rocks, mapping the surface of Mars, and capturing the first photographic images of the birthplace of stars among other achievements. His later work at Lockheed Martin as vice president of Flight Systems from 1989-2002 remained closely linked with NASA.

== Life and career ==
Born in Brooklyn and raised in Chatham, New Jersey, Hinners was one of eight children born to William and Hazel Hinners. His father was an insurance agent, and his mother a homemaker. He earned degrees from Rutgers University (Bachelor of Agricultural Science, 1958), California Institute of Technology (master's in Geology), and Princeton University (Ph.D in Geochemistry, 1963).

After graduating from Princeton, Hinners worked for Bellcomm, a subsidiary of AT&T that worked closely with NASA. With Bellcomm he spent the next nine years working on the science of the Apollo program, including making many of the site selections for the Apollo missions. From 1972 to 1974 he served as NASA's director of Lunar Programs and from 1974 to 1979 he was NASA's associate administrator for Space Science.

In 1979, Hinners left NASA to become the director of the Smithsonian's National Air and Space Museum. He left that post to become the fifth director of the NASA Goddard Space Flight Center on June 14, 1982, succeeding A. Thomas Young. He served until June 22, 1987 and was replaced by John W. Townsend Jr. From 1987 to 1989 he served as NASA Chief Scientist and associate deputy administrator of NASA. He then became vice president of Flight System at Lockheed Martin where he remained until his retirement in 2002. His work at Lockheed Martin was still closely tied to NASA, including responsibilities for NASA's Mars Global Surveyor, Mars Surveyor Program, Mars Reconnaissance Orbiter, Stardust and Genesis Discovery missions, Space (Nuclear) Power Systems and Mission Operations for NASA/LM planetary missions.

Hinners died of basal-cell carcinoma at the age of 78 in Littleton, Colorado.
