= Government Affairs Institute =

Georgetown University program

The Government Affairs Institute at Georgetown University
- Seal of Georgetown University
- Other names: GAI
- Established: 1965
- Location: Washington, D.C., U.S.
- Website: gai.georgetown.edu

The Government Affairs Institute (GAI) at Georgetown University is a non-profit, non-partisan organization whose mission is to provide education and training about congressional processes, organization, and practices, and about selected legislative policy issues. GAI is affiliated with the McCourt School of Public Policy and Georgetown University in Washington, DC. GAI offers a certificate in legislative studies program and conducts a variety of courses on Capitol Hill, and at its offices in Georgetown. The Institute faculty consists of professional educators who are congressional observers and practitioners with backgrounds in political science, public administration, history, and economics, under the direction of Kristin Nicholson, who became GAI Director in 2017. Nicholson was preceded by Kenneth Gold, who served as GAI's director from 1992 to 2017.

== History ==
GAI was established in 1965 as part of the executive branch's United States Civil Service Commission. In 1978, the Institute became part of the United States Office of Personnel Management as a result of the Civil Service Reform Act of 1978 which restructured the functions of the Civil Service Commission.

From 1978 to 1984, Elizabeth Duke served as the director of the Government Affairs Institute in OPM's Office of Executive and Management Development.

GAI was privatized by the federal government in 1995 and began its current affiliation with Georgetown University in 1997.

== Faculty ==
GAI consists of the director, assistant director, and four senior fellows. Its programs also feature a group of regular speakers, including current and former congressional staff and Members of Congress. Kristin Nicholson is the Director.

The faculty blog "GAI On the Hill" was established in March 2004 and continues to provide active commentary and insight about events on Capitol Hill. Some of the faculty are former Congressional Fellows and remain connected with the program. In 2017, faculty members began hosting a podcast called "Congress: Two Beers In" which features GAI's senior fellows and a series of special guests discussing current topics and events of interest to those who follow Congress.
