= Otto Klineberg =

Canadian psychologist

- Born: 2 November 1899; Quebec City, Quebec, Canada
- Died: 6 March 1992 (aged 92); Bethesda, Maryland

Academic background
- Education: B.A., 1919, McGill University; MA., 1920, Harvard University; MD, 1925 McGill University; PhD., 1928, Columbia University
- Alma mater: Columbia University
- Thesis: An experimental study of speed and other factors in "racial" differences (1928)
- Doctoral advisor: Robert S. Woodworth

Academic work
- Discipline: social psychology
- Institutions: Columbia University; University of Paris

Otto Klineberg (2 November 1899, in Quebec City, Quebec, Canada – 6 March 1992, in Bethesda, Maryland) was a Canadian born psychologist. He held professorships in social psychology at Columbia University and the University of Paris. His pioneering work in the 1930s on the intelligence of white and black students in the United States and his evidence as an expert witness in Delaware were instrumental in winning the Supreme Court school segregation case Brown v. Board of Education in 1954. Through his work in UNESCO and elsewhere, he helped to promote psychology internationally.

== Career ==
Born in Quebec City, Klineberg was raised in Montreal. He was one of eight children "brought up in a friendly and warm atmosphere and conservative Jewish tradition". He obtained a bachelor's degree from McGill University in 1919, a master's degree in philosophy from Harvard University in 1920, a medical degree from McGill in 1925 and a Ph.D. in psychology from Columbia University in 1928. He remained at Columbia as chairman of the newly created department of social psychology. There, he was influenced by Franz Boas, a German anthropologist who created the cultural anthropology doctoral program at Columbia.

In 1929, he began research about the psychological differences between African Americans and Native Americans, which, though controversial at the time, helped to correct prior beliefs of race-based inferiority. Klineberg's research focused greatly on race problems, minorities, immigrants, nationality, and other topics related to culture and personality. In 1931, his views that there was no scientific basis for racial superiority was controversial.

He married Selma Gintzler in 1933, with whom he had a daughter and two sons. Klineberg was a polyglot and spoke English, German, Chinese in addition to the major Romance Languages.

In the 1950s and early 1960s, Klineberg held a senior post in the social sciences in UNESCO. He helped found the International Social Science Council and the International Union of Psychological Science, on which he served on the executive committee (1951–1969), as secretary-general (1955–1960) and as president (1960–1963).

From 1961 to 1982 he was professor at the University of Paris, where he directed the International Center for Intergroup Relations until 1982.

In 1963 Klineberg was president of the 17th International Congress of Psychology, held in Washington DC. He was also president of the World Federation for Mental Health, the Inter-America Society of Psychology, the Eastern Psychological Association of the United States and the Society for the Psychological Study of Social Issues.

On his retirement to Manhattan in 1982, he taught part-time at the City University of New York until 1990. He died following a brief period of Parkinson's disease.

His son, John M. Klineberg, was an aerospace engineer who directed two NASA centers.

== Awards and honors ==
- 1928: National Research Council Fellowship
- 1950: Butler Medal, Columbia University
- 1956: Kurt Lewin Memorial Award
- 1958: Honorary Ph.D., University of Brazil, Rio de Janeiro
- 1961: Honorary Ph.D., Howard University, Washington DC
- 1972: Honorary Ph.D., Drew University, Madison, Wisconsin
- 1974: Medal, University of Liège, Belgium
- 1978: Annual award, International Society for Educational, Cultural and Scientific Interchanges
- 1979: American Psychological Association Distinguished Award for Contributions of Psychology in the Public Interest
- 1979: Award from Brazil, Contributions to the development of psychology in Brazil
- 1983: Honorary life member, New York Academy of Science
- 1984: Social Psychology Award, New York State Psychological Association
- 1985: APF Gold Medal Award, Lifetime Contribution of a Psychologist in the Public Interest
- 1991: American Psychological Association Award for Distinguished Contributions to the International Advancement of Psychology

== Selected bibliography ==
- Experimental study of speed and others factors in ″racial″ differences, New York, 1928.
- Negro intelligence and selective migration, Columbia University Press, 1935.
- Race differences, New York : Harper and brothers, 1935.
- Characteristics of the American Negro. Harper and brothers, 1944
- Social psychology, H. Holt and Company, 1948
- Tensions Affecting International Understanding. A Survey of Research. Social Science Research Council, 1950
- Race and psychology, Paris : UNESCO, 1951.
- Nationalism and tribalism among African students. A study of social identity (with Marisa Zavalloni), 1969.
- Étudiants du Tiers-monde en Europe. Problèmes d'adaptation, une étude effectuée en Autriche, en France, aux Pays-Bas et en Yougoslavie (with Jeanne Ben Brika), Paris : Mouton, 1972.
- Vers une meilleure compréhension internationale : l'apport contemporain de la psychologie, Éditions Inter-nationales, Paris, 1974.
- International educational exchange : an assessment of its nature and its prospects, (with Heine von Alemann) École des hautes études en sciences sociales, Paris, 1976.
