= John W. Townsend Jr. =

American physicist and NASA engineer (1924–2011)

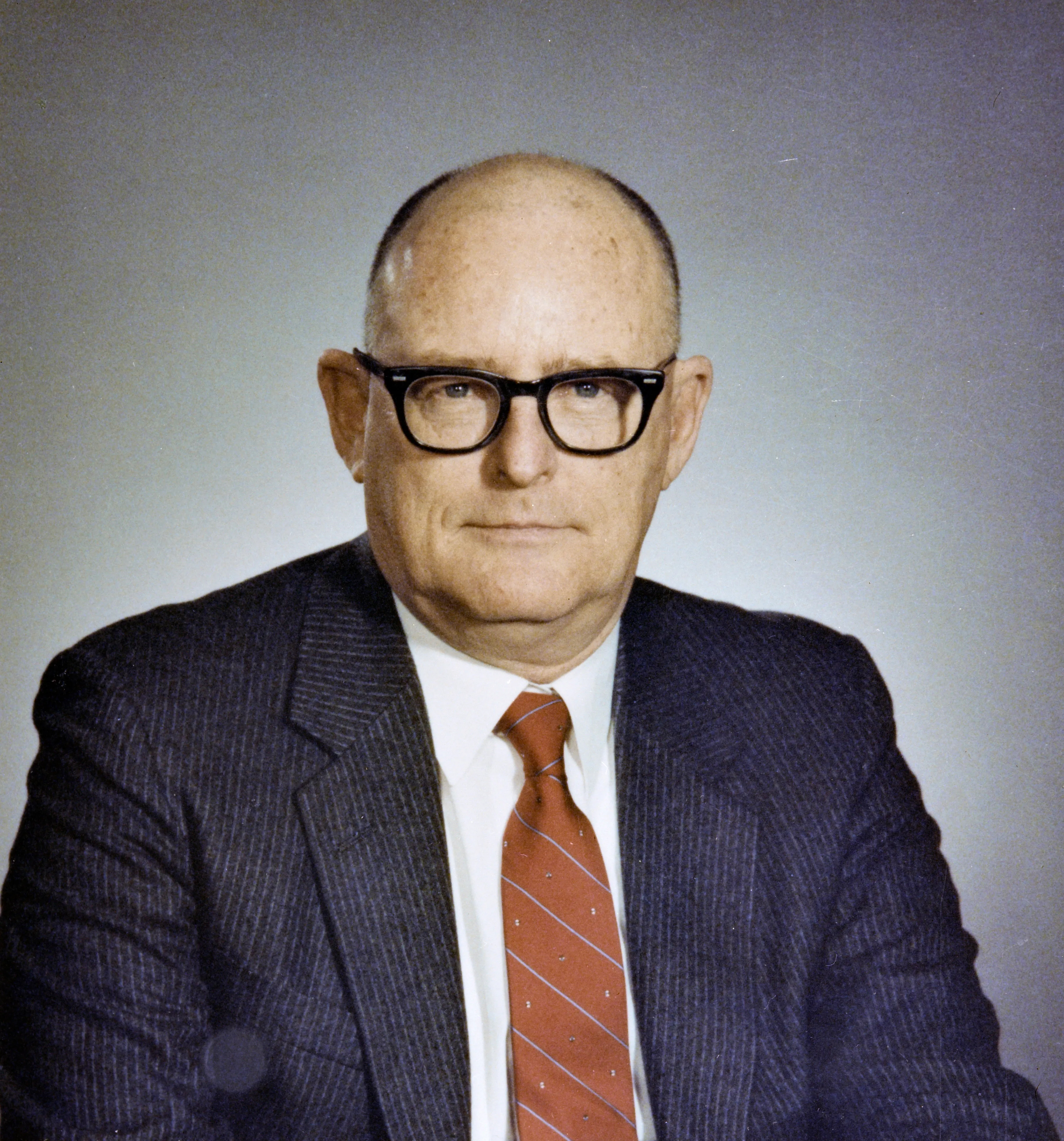
- Portrait in 1987

6th Director of Goddard Space Flight Center
- In office 1987–1990
- Preceded by: Noel Hinners
- Succeeded by: John M. Klineberg

Personal details
- Born: John William Townsend Jr. 1924 Washington, D.C., U.S.
- Died: October 29, 2011 (aged 87) Washington, D.C., U.S.
- Education: Williams College (BA, MA, Hon. DSc)
- Awards: NASA Distinguished Service Medal (twice)

John William Townsend Jr. (1924 – October 29, 2011), known as Jack Townsend, was an American physicist and aerospace engineer who contributed to the development of the United States space program.

After the formation of NASA in 1958, he was among the first people to join NASA's Goddard Space Flight Center as assistant director in 1959 and was appointed its sixth director from 1987 to 1990. Townsend worked with James Van Allen on sounding rockets and was later involved in the creation of the world's first weather, communications, and Earth observation satellites. He served as a presidential appointee at the Environmental Science Services Administration (ESSA) and the National Oceanic and Atmospheric Administration (NOAA) and held executive positions at Fairchild Industries.

He was elected to the National Academy of Engineering in 1975 and twice awarded the NASA Distinguished Service Medal, the agency's highest honor.

== Early life and education ==
Townsend was born and raised in Washington, D.C. in 1924. He graduated from Woodrow Wilson High School in 1942. An early interest in technology led him, at sixteen, to obtain a pilot's license and an amateur radio license, and he maintained both for the rest of his life.

During World War II, he served in the United States Army Air Forces in the Pacific theater, flying radar countermeasures aboard B-29 bombers. After the war, he enrolled at Williams College in Massachusetts, where he earned a Bachelor of Arts and a Master of Arts in physics. The college later awarded him an honorary Doctor of Science degree.

== Career ==
=== Naval Research Laboratory ===
In 1949, Townsend joined the United States Naval Research Laboratory (NRL) working on the nascent American sounding rocket program at White Sands Missile Range in New Mexico as a research physicist. He instrumented V-2 rockets captured from Germany at the end of the war and began working on sounding rockets like Viking for upper-atmosphere research.

Throughout the 1950s, he worked on the Aerobee sounding rocket with Eleanor C. Pressly and James Van Allen, who had initiated the Aerobee's development at the Applied Physics Laboratory. Townsend published a book chapter on the vehicle with Van Allen and Pressly in 1959. The Aerobee was the United States' primary suborbital research rocket, first launched in late 1947. Over the following decades it flew numerous missions across multiple variants studying atmospheric physics, astronomy, cosmic rays, and related phenomena from altitudes typically ranging between 40 and 65 miles. Its highest recorded flight, in June 1955, exceeded 91 miles.

The test flights allowed Townsend to develop mass spectrometry using radio frequencies. As part of studies conducted for the Naval Research Laboratory, he measured data on atmospheric gas from rockets flown over the upper atmosphere over White Sands Missile Range and the subarctic town of Churchill, Manitoba, though he advised that the two places were too small a sample size to reliably calculate the atmosphere throughout the entire Earth. Cameras mounted on Nike-Cajun rocket photographed the Earth during ascent; these images later drew the attention of meteorologist Harry Wexler at the United States Weather Bureau and contributed to early discussions about orbital weather observation.

=== Goddard Space Flight Center ===
With the establishment of NASA in 1958, both the Vanguard Project and Townsend's NRL branch were folded into the new agency by President Dwight D. Eisenhower, and Townsend took charge of the Space Sciences Division. He was one of the earliest people to work at the newly opened Goddard Space Flight Center in Greenbelt, Maryland, joining in 1959 as the center's acting director until Harry J. Goett was appointed director in September 1959, after which Townsend continued as assistant director for Space Science and Satellite Applications.

Townsend was chosen as acting director because his ties with figures from the NRL, including John F. Clark and as deputy under Homer E. Newell Jr., helped ease early friction between Goddard and NASA Headquarters. When a dispute arose between the two centers over the boundary between program and project management, Townsend, then Goett's senior official for space science, argued that programs containing only a single project made the boundary unworkable. He recommended grouping several projects under each program manager, an approach Newell and his deputy Edgar Cortright agreed to adopt.

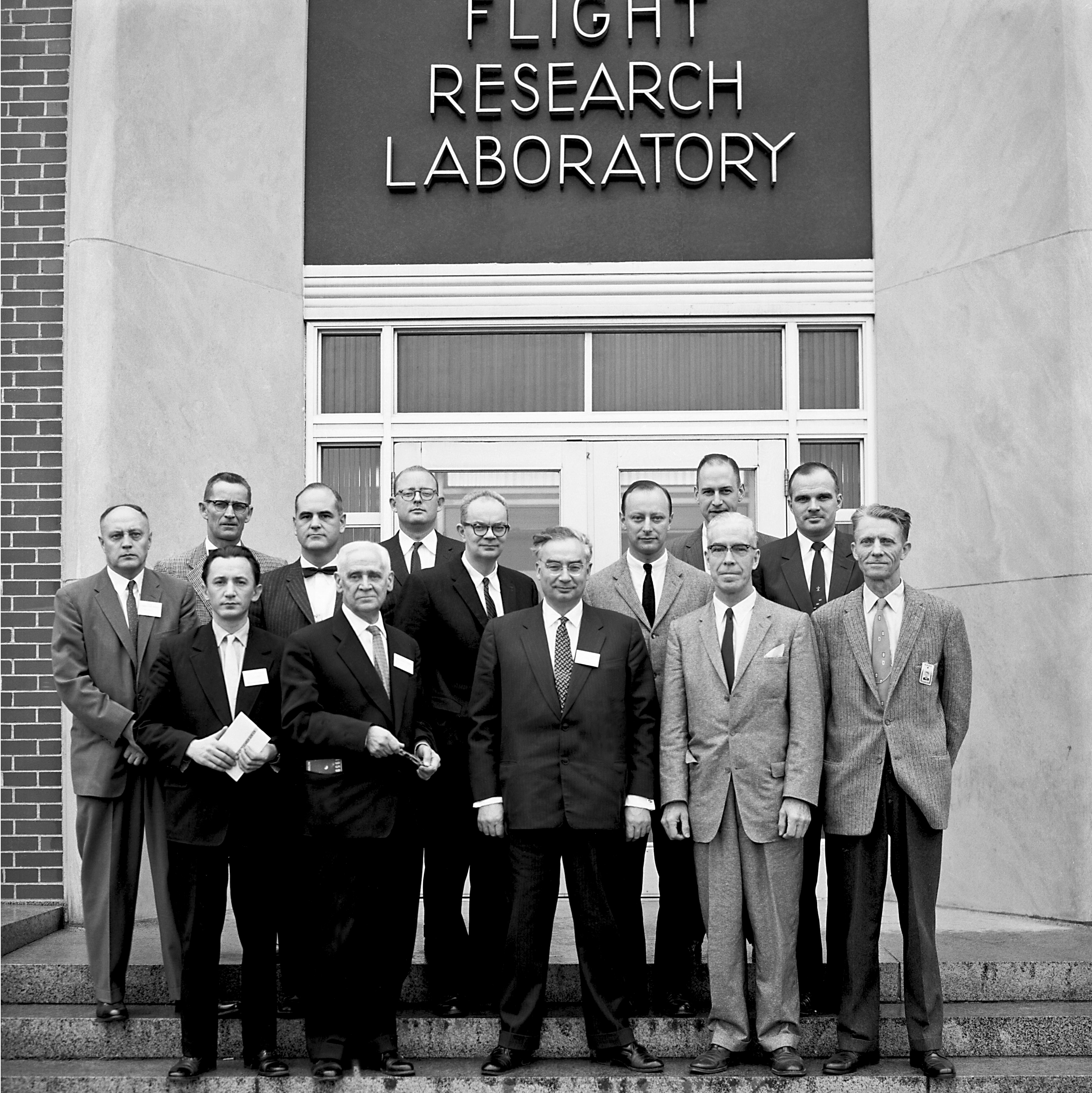
Townsend (back row, left) with Soviet scientists including Leonid Sedov and Anatoly Blagonravov in 1959

Frank McDonald, a NASA scientist who worked closely with Townsend, credited him with helping choose the Greenbelt site and guiding the research the new center would pursue. Townsend built up a group devoted to spacecraft fabrication and led the scientists responsible for its launch vehicles. Newell later wrote that Townsend aided Goett in "building up Goddard" and "launching their initial projects".

Townsend was involved in the development of early meteorological, communications, and Earth-viewing satellite systems. One of the satellites developed at Goddard, TIROS-1, was launched in April 1960 and became the world's first successful weather satellite. He was appointed deputy director of Goddard in 1965, a post he held until 1968, during which time he pressed for institutional investment in astronomy, solar physics, and related space sciences. He was also called to testify about Sputnik 3 during the Sputnik crisis, as noted by the CIA.

He also served on a three-person presidential commission that negotiated early agreements with the Soviet Union on the peaceful and civilian uses of outer space, including arrangements for the international exchange of meteorological satellite data.

=== NOAA and federal service ===
In 1968, Townsend was named the deputy administrator of the Environmental Science Services Administration (ESSA) by President Lyndon B. Johnson. In July 1970, he briefed the Senate Commerce Committee's subcommittee for oceanography on Reorganization Plan No.4, a proposal to consolidate the ESSA with the Bureau of Commercial Fisheries and other federal marine programs into a single agency. The plan took effect in October 1970, with the creation of the National Oceanic and Atmospheric Administration (NOAA). The ESSA was the largest constituent, with almost 10,000 civil servants forming two-thirds of the new agency. President Richard Nixon appointed him NOAA's associate administrator, serving under Robert M. White, with whom he had led ESSA. He served in the position until 1977.

The new agency combined organizations with long-separate histories and institutional culture. He responded to concerns raised by Senator Mike Gravel and conservation groups that fisheries programs would be marginalized within a commerce-oriented agency. During this nine-year period of leadership, he was involved in developing operational meteorological polar orbiting and geostationary satellite systems. The joint NASA–NOAA geostationary experiments begun under ESSA became operational with the launch of the Synchronous Meteorological Satellite in 1974–1975 and of GOES-1, NOAA's first geostationary satellite, in October 1975. In recognition of this work, the National Academy of Engineering elected him as a member in 1975.

=== Private sector ===
After leaving federal service in the late 1970s, Townsend moved into the private aerospace industry. He served as President of the space division of Fairchild Industries and subsequently rose to Executive Vice President of the parent company, a position he held until 1987.

=== Return to NASA and Goddard directorship ===
Following the Space Shuttle Challenger disaster in January 1986, NASA Administrator James Fletcher called on Townsend and other experienced former officials to assist the agency. Townsend worked at NASA headquarters during the period preceding the Space Shuttle's return to flight. On June 22, 1987, he was appointed Director of Goddard Space Flight Center, succeeding Noel Hinners.

During his three years as director, the center delivered several achievements central to NASA's recovery from the Challenger accident. The Space Shuttle returned to flight in September 1988 with the STS-26 mission, which deployed a Tracking and Data Relay Satellite (TDRS-3), restoring the Goddard-managed Tracking and Data Relay Satellite System after the loss of a second satellite aboard Challenger. In November 1989, Goddard launched the Cosmic Background Explorer (COBE), a satellite built in-house at the center that had been redesigned in under three years to fly on a Delta rocket after the Challenger accident eliminated its planned Space Shuttle launch. COBE's measurements of the cosmic microwave background provided evidence for the Big Bang, which physicist Stephen Hawking called "the discovery of the century, if not of all time." Goddard also managed development of the Hubble Space Telescope's scientific instruments and its mission operations ahead of the telescope's launch in April 1990.

He retired on June 30, 1990, and was succeeded by John M. Klineberg.

== Later life and legacy ==
After retiring, Townsend remained active in advisory and scientific capacities. He chaired the National Research Council's Space Applications Board and contributed to scientific studies undertaken by the National Academies and other bodies, including a report on low-altitude wind shear and aviation safety. In 1982, following the crash of Pan Am Flight 759 in a downburst, Congress directed the Federal Aviation Administration to commission a National Academy of Sciences study of wind shear hazards. Townsend chaired the committee whose 1983 report confirmed low-altitude wind shear as a significant hazard to aircraft during takeoff and landing. The report recommended better detection and increased pilot training.

He served on panels including the NASA Advisory Council, the Advisory Board Panel on International Cooperation and Competition in Civilian Space Activities at the Office of Technology Assessment, and the International Academy of Astronautics.

Townsend died on October 29, 2011, at Sibley Memorial Hospital in Washington, D.C., from complications of lung cancer, at the age of 87.

Upon his death, Goddard Director Rob Strain said that Townsend had been "truly one of the seminal figures in the history of NASA, and certainly, in the history of Goddard," adding that a history of the American space program "simply could not be written without a chapter devoted to him."

== Personal life ==
Townsend's hobbies included live steam rail models, orchid-growing, and sailing. He held an amateur radio license from the age of 16, operating under the callsign W3PRB for more than six decades, and was a member of the American Radio Relay League.

He had three children with his first wife, Mary Lewis Townsend, who died in 1986 following a 38-year marriage, and he later married JoAnn Clayton Townsend.

== Awards and fellowships ==
- National Academy of Engineering (elected 1975)
- Member of the International Academy of Astronautics
- Fellow of the American Institute of Aeronautics and Astronautics
- Edward A. Flinn III Award (American Geophysical Union, 1999)
- NASA Distinguished Service Medal (awarded twice; 1971)
- NASA Outstanding Leadership Medal (1962)
- Fellow of the American Meteorological Society (1993)
- National Air and Space Museum Wall of Honor inductee
