= Mary Richmond =

American social worker (1861–1928)

Mary Ellen Richmond
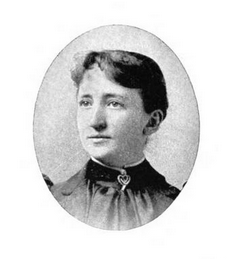
- Richmond in 1894
- Born: August 5, 1861; Belleville, Illinois, US
- Died: September 12, 1928 (aged 67)

Mary Ellen Richmond (August 5, 1861 – September 12, 1928) was an American social work pioneer. She is regarded as the mother of professional social work along with Jane Addams. She founded social case work, the first method of social work and was herself a Caseworker.

== Early life ==
She was born on August 5, 1861, in Belleville, Illinois. Her parents died when Mary was 3, along with all three of her siblings due to Tuberculosis, which forced her to live with her grandmother and aunts in Baltimore, Maryland. She was the second oldest daughter of Henry Richmond, a carriage blacksmith, and Lavinia Harris Richmond, the daughter of a prominent Baltimore, Maryland, jeweler and real estate broker.

Richmond was then raised by her widowed maternal grandmother, Mehitable Harris, and two aunts. Her grandmother was an active women's suffragist who was well known for being a spiritualist and a radical. She grew up being constantly surrounded by discussions of suffrage, political and social beliefs, and spiritualism. This meant she was handed down good critical thinking skills and a caring attitude toward the poor, needy and disabled. Her grandmother taught the important topics of inequality, suffrage, racial problems, spiritualism, and a variety of liberal, social, and political beliefs.

Richmond was home schooled until the age of eleven, and then entered a public school. She had to be home schooled because her grandmother didn't believe in the traditional education system. While home schooled, Mary dedicated herself to reading as much as she could and was mostly self-taught through her dedication to learn. Being around such strong intelligent women, Richmond was actually quite shy and liked to be by herself.

She graduated in 1878 from Baltimore Eastern Female High School, at the age of sixteen. She then went to live with one of her aunts in New York City. However, when her aunt became very ill, she left Mary alone in poverty. After living in poverty for two years in New York she returned to Baltimore and worked for several years as a bookkeeper, and became extremely involved with the Unitarian Church.

In 1889, she applied for a job as Assistant Treasurer with the Charity Organization Society (COS). This organization was in several cities, and was the first organization to develop a structured social work profession which provided services to the poor, disabled, and needy. Her involvement in this organization led to her contributions in social work. Mary was active in social work until her death in September 1928.

== Contributions to social work ==
Mary Richmond increased the public's awareness of the Charity Organization Society and the philanthropic opportunities to support social work. She was trained to be a "friendly visitor," which was the initial term for a caseworker. She visited the homes of people in need and tried to help them improve their life situation. She began to develop many ideas of how casework could best be conducted to help those in need. During the time Richmond was connected to the Charity Organized Society, she demonstrated her qualities as a leader, teacher, and practical theorist.

In 1900, she became general secretary of the Philadelphia Society of Organizing Charity. Mary remained in this position for nine years, in that time she advocated for legislation reform concerning compulsory education, child labor, and spousal desertion and nonsupport. In addition, Mary believed the government should create a children's bureau and juvenile court system.

In 1909 she helped establish networks of social workers and a method by which they did their work. This all started when she became the director of the Charity Organizational Department of the Russell Sage Foundation in New York City. While director, Mary worked to improve record keeping, improved training for caseworkers, and helped implement new social works programs. Mary believed a firm cooperation between social workers, educators and the health care system was crucial to successfully helping those in need. Her career took off from charity organization leadership in Baltimore and Philadelphia to an executive position with the prestigious Russell Sage Foundation in New York City. The social workers she worked with at the Russell Sage Foundation were among the first enabled to develop methods and systems for helping needy families. Her success and leadership at developing social work and research encouraged many other organizations to continue financial support and development of the practice of social work. Mary believed social welfare was a civic responsibility and many of her theories on social work were adopted for use in Asia, South America and Europe.

Some of the most notable contributions Mary Richmond gave was that she fought to obtain legislation for deserted wives and founded the Pennsylvania Child Labor Committee, the Public Charities Associated, the juvenile court, and the Housing Association.

A huge part of her work was dedicated to research in the field of social work, which is shown by her instructions on how to gather information, interview methodologies, establishing contact and conducting conversations. By making this, she became a great factor in the profession of social work, Mary Richmond showed the importance of the education of the social work field.

Richmond identified six sources of power that are available to clients and their social workers: sources within the household, in the person of the client, in the neighborhood and wider social networks, in civil agencies, in private and public agencies.

Mary Richmond never married or had any children, and died in New York City in 1928 due to cancer.

== Publications ==
Some books she published with her ideas: Friendly Visiting among the Poor, Social Diagnosis and What is Social Case Work. Within these books she demonstrated her understanding of social casework. She believed in the relationship between people and their social environment as the major factor of their life situation or status. Her ideas were based on social theory and that social problems for a family or individual should be looked at by first looking at the individual or family, then including their closest social ties such as families, schools, churches, jobs, etc. After looking at these factors the community and government should be looked at. This will dictate the norms for the person to help determine how to help the person make adjustments to improve their situation. Richmond focused on the strengths of the person rather than blaming them for the bad. Her focus was mostly on children, medical social work, and families. All of her ideas are now the basis for social work education today.

She also had an influence in the history of social welfare from her research and study Nine Hundred Eighty-five Widows, which looked at families, their work situations, the financial resources of widows and how widows were treated by social welfare systems.

Richmond, Mary Ellen (1899), Friendly Visiting among the Poor. A Handbook for Charity Workers, New York/London: MacMillan

Richmond, Mary Ellen (1908), The good neighbor in the modern city, Philadelphia: J.B. Lippincott

Richmond, Mary Ellen (1913), A study of nine hundred and eighty-five widows known to certain charity organization societies in 1910, New York City: Charity Organization, Russell Sage Foundation

Richmond, Mary Ellen (1917), Social diagnosis, New York: Russell Sage Foundation

Richmond, Mary Ellen (1922), What is social case work? An introductory description, New York: Russell Sage Foundation
