= Ohio Aerospace Institute =

American nonprofit aerospace research consortium

- Abbreviation: OAI
- Founded: 1989; 37 years ago
- Founders: John M. Klineberg; NASA Lewis Research Center
- Type: Nonprofit research institute
- Legal status: 501(c)(3)
- Headquarters: Brook Park, Ohio, U.S.
- Location: 22800 Cedar Point Road
- Key people: John M. Sankovic (president and CEO)
- Affiliations: NASA Glenn Research Center; Air Force Research Laboratory; Parallax Advanced Research
- Website: www.oai.org

The Ohio Aerospace Institute (OAI) is a nonprofit aerospace research consortium based in Cleveland, Ohio adjacent to NASA's Glenn Research Center. It was established in 1989 by center director John M. Klineberg to improve NASA's ties with industry, universities, and the military. Conceived as a public–private consortium, the OAI brought together Ohio universities, NASA Glenn, the Wright Laboratory, and private firms, and began operations in 1992. NASA established the institute to draw more aerospace business to Ohio and speed the transfer of technology from university and federal laboratories into commercial development.

The institute administers graduate fellowships and STEM education programs and supports research at NASA Glenn and the Air Force Research Laboratory (AFRL) at Wright-Patterson Air Force Base.

== History ==
=== Founding ===
The institute grew out of an effort by NASA's Lewis Research Center to deepen its ties with universities, industry, and the military. In 1989, Lewis director John M. Klineberg arranged the transfer of about eight acres of NASA land to an aerospace consortium to establish the institute. Conceived as a public–private partnership, the consortium brought together nine Ohio universities with doctoral programs in aerospace-related engineering, Lewis, the Air Force's Wright Laboratory at Wright-Patterson, and private firms. NASA hoped the arrangement would draw aerospace business to Ohio and speed the transfer of technology from university and federal laboratories into commercial development.

The institute's founding chairman of the board was John A. Flower (1921–2011), president of Cleveland State University. He was succeeded in 1991 by Patrick S. Parker, chairman of Parker Hannifin. The organization began operations in 1992.

=== Headquarters building ===
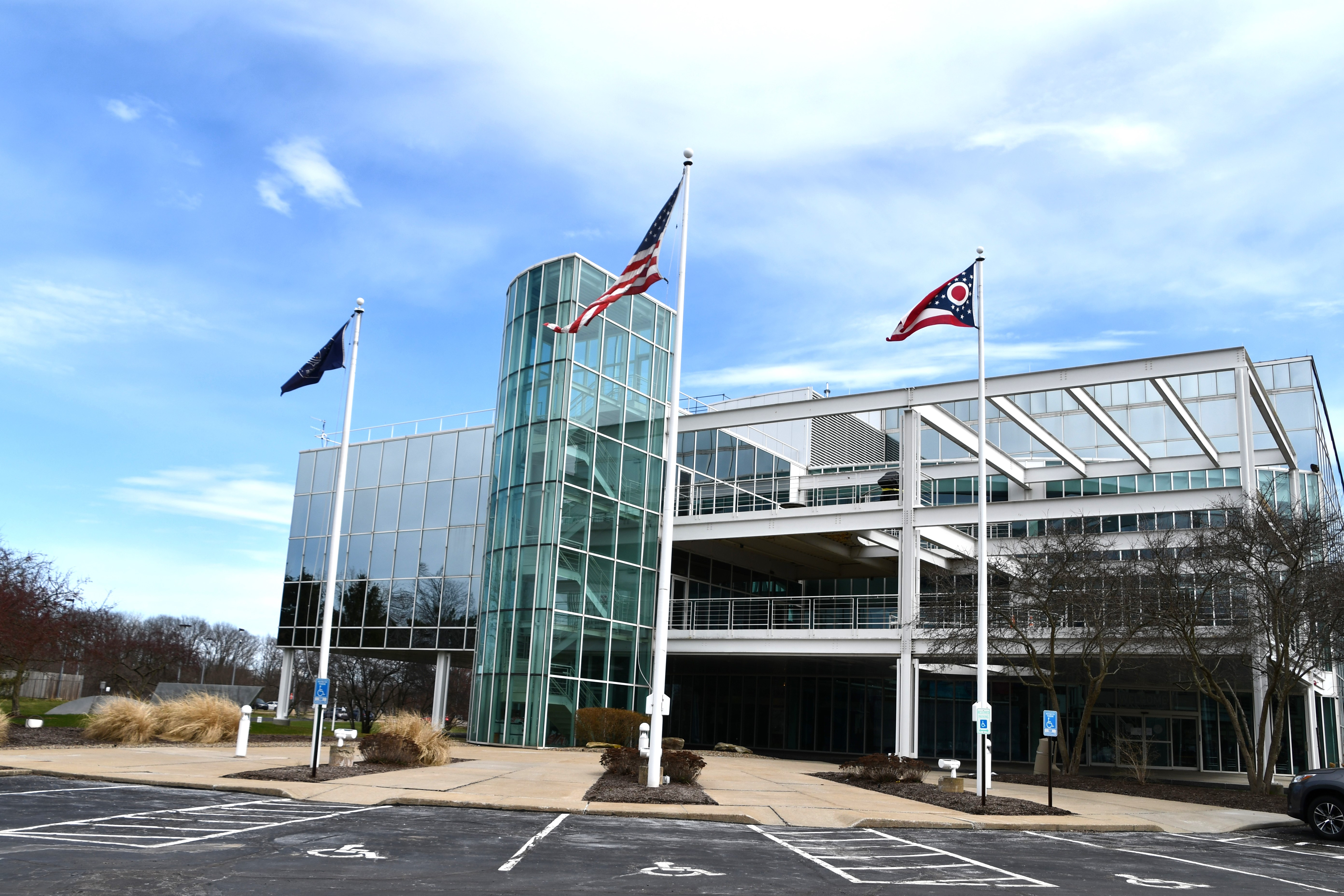
Facade of the OAI building

OAI's headquarters, situated just outside the western gate of NASA Glenn and near the runways of Cleveland Hopkins International Airport, was designed by Cleveland architect Richard Fleischman and completed in 1994. The building features a three-story atrium linking a lecture hall, classrooms, offices, and workshops beneath a sweeping roof. Banners of the founding universities and a list of industry members hang in the atrium.

=== Later developments ===
By 2010, the institute reported having managed more than $206 million in funds and over 250 federal awards, and to have formed collaborations with more than 100 industry, university, and government organizations. In 2023, OAI entered into an affiliation with Parallax Advanced Research, a research institute headquartered in Beavercreek, Ohio, to jointly manage research initiatives and public–private partnerships.

== Organization ==
OAI is a 501(c)(3) nonprofit and operates as a joint initiative of NASA Glenn, AFRL at Wright-Patterson, the State of Ohio, a group of Ohio public and private universities granting doctoral degrees in aerospace-related disciplines, and aerospace companies. Founding-era industry supporters in the Cleveland area included TRW, General Electric, and Parker Hannifin. The institute draws funding from federal grants and contracts, industry revenue, and the state of Ohio.

== Programs and research ==
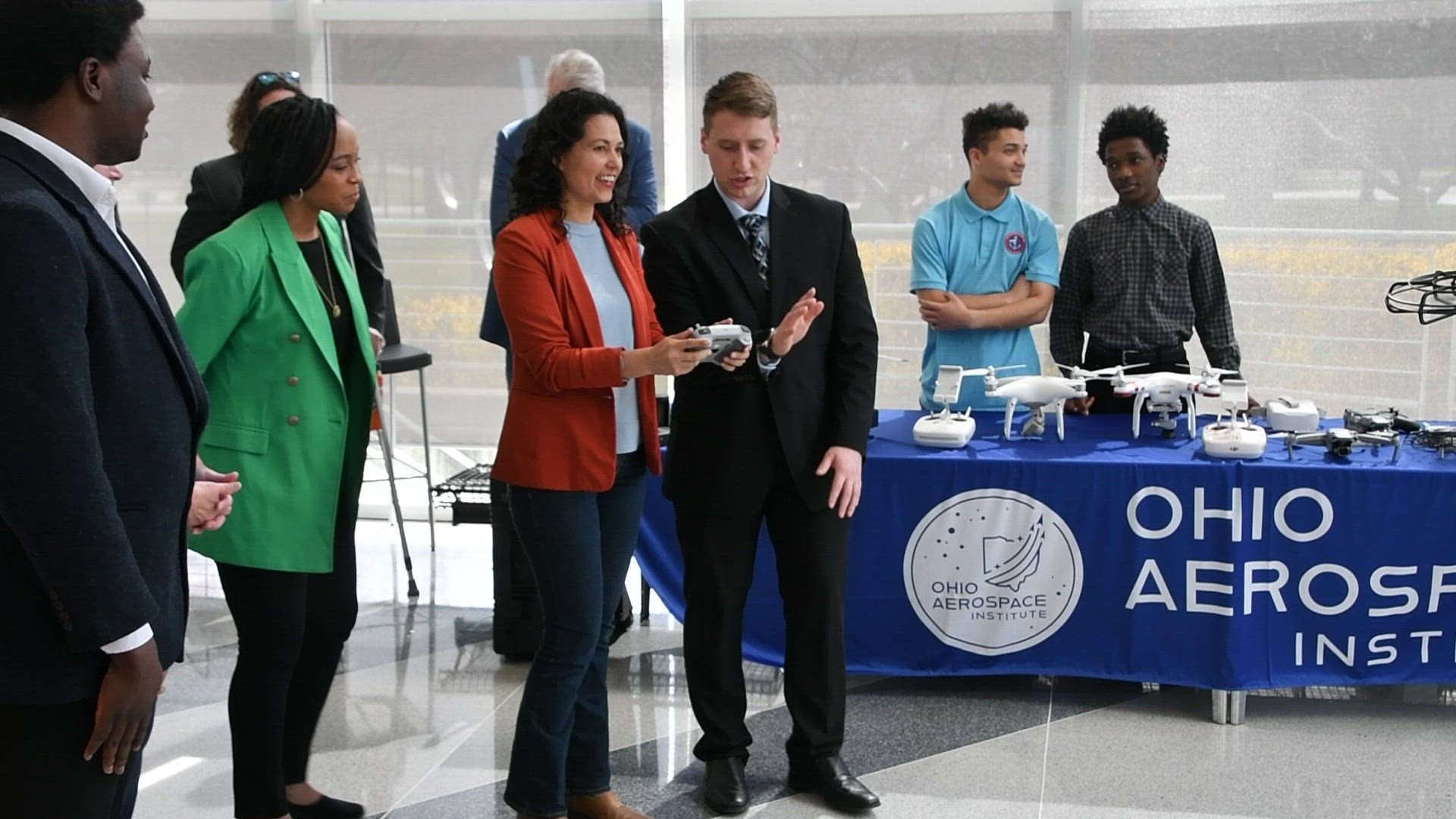
U.S. Department of Agriculture Deputy Secretary Xochitl Torres Small and U.S. Rep. Shontel Brown visiting OAI (2024)

OAI provides on-site research support to NASA Glenn and AFRL and manages technical projects for other federal laboratories. Since its inception it has served as administrator of the AeroAcoustics Research Consortium, an industry–government group studying aircraft engine and airframe noise.

The institute is the lead organization for the Ohio Space Grant Consortium (OSGC), which was established in 1989 as part of the congressionally chartered National Space Grant College and Fellowship Program administered by NASA. OSGC awards scholarships and fellowships to students in STEM fields at member universities. OAI also operates K–12 education and workforce-development programs.

== Leadership ==
Michael Salkind served as president of OAI until 2003, when he was succeeded by William Seelbach, a former president of Brush Engineered Materials. Jeffrey Rolf served as president and CEO until resigning in 2018. In September 2018, the board of trustees named John M. Sankovic, a former NASA Glenn chief technologist with a 31-year career at the agency, as president and CEO.
