= Dr. Robert H. Goddard Memorial Trophy =

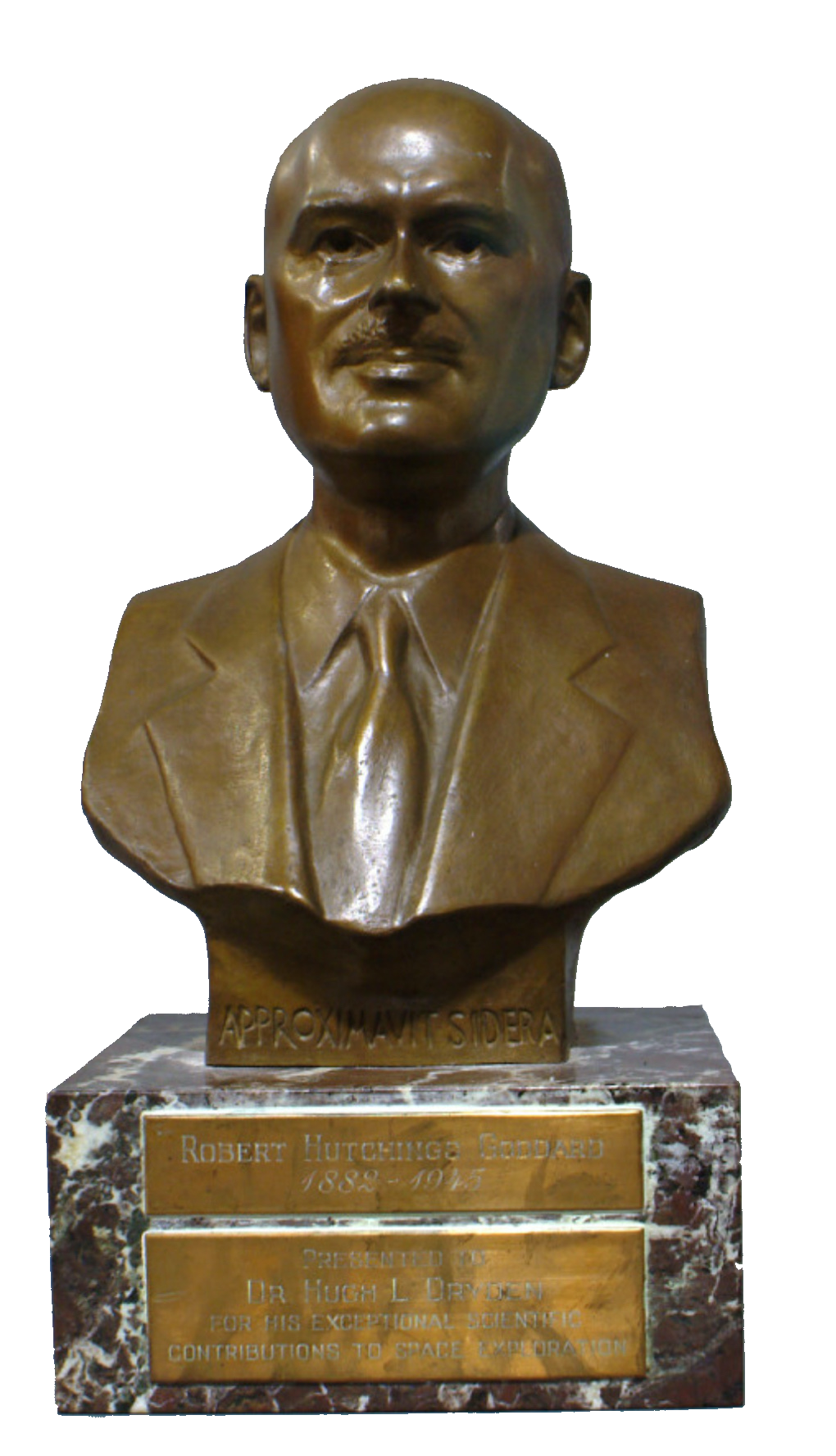
The Dr. Robert H. Goddard Memorial Trophy presented annually by the National Space Club.

The Dr. Robert H. Goddard Memorial Trophy is awarded annually to an individual or group determined to have made the most impact on space activities over the past year. It is named after Robert Goddard, the father of modern rocketry. It is the primary award of the National Space Club presented during the Dr. Robert H. Goddard Memorial Dinner in Washington, D.C.

== List of award winners ==
Year	Winner
2023	Webb Telescope team
2022	Ingenuity Mars Helicopter team
2021	NASA & SpaceX Crew Demo-2 team
2020	William H. Gerstenmaier
2019	Robert M. Lightfoot Jr.
2018	John E. Hyten
2017	New Shepard team
2016	New Horizons team
2015	Harold Rosen
2014	Kepler team
2013	Curiosity/Mars Science Laboratory team
2012	GPS Originator Team
2011	Simon Ramo, PhD
2010	Norman R. Augustine
2009	Michael D. Griffin
2008	Peter B. Teets
2007	Captain John W. Young, USN (Ret.)
2006	Dr. James Van Allen
2005	Mars Exploration Rover Project Team
2004	STS-107 Space Shuttle Columbia Accident Recovery Team
2003	The STS-107 Crew
2002	First International Space Station Expedition Crew
2001	Daniel S. Goldin
2000	Keith R. Hall
1999	John Glenn
1998	Dr. Sheila E. Widnall
1997	Dr. Shannon W. Lucid
1996	Jimmie D. Hill
1995	Gen. Thomas S. Moorman, Jr.
1994	The Crew of Space Shuttle Mission 61
1993	Forrest S. McCartney
1992	The Magellan Project Team Leaders
1991	Norman Ralph Augustine
1990	Dr. Lew Allen, Jr.
1989	The Shuttle Return to Flight Team
1988	James M. Beggs
1987	Edward C. Aldridge, Jr.
1986	Lieutenant General James A. Abrahamson
1985	President Ronald Reagan
1984	Congressman Don Fuqua
1983	John F. Yardley
1982	The Crewmen for STS 1 & 2
1981	The NASA/JPL Voyager Team
1980	The NASA/JPL Voyager Project Team
1979	Christopher C. Kraft, Jr.
1978	Charles S. Draper
1977	Viking Project Team
1976	Frank E. Moss
1975	The Skylab Astronauts
1974	Olin F. Teague
1973	George M. Low
1972	Clinton P. Anderson
1971	James E. Webb
1970	The Apollo 11 astronauts
1969	The Apollo 8 astronauts
1968	Robert C. Seamans, Jr.
1967	George P. Miller
1966	Lyndon B. Johnson
1965	William H. Pickering
1964	Hugh L. Dryden
1963	John H. Glenn
1962	Robert R. Gilruth
1961	Lockheed Missiles & Space Division
1960	Karol J. Bossard
1959	Samuel K. Hoffman
1958	Wernher von Braun
