= Elizabeth Duke (administrator) =

American Health administrator

Elizabeth M. Duke was the administrator for the Health Resources and Services Administration (HRSA) from March 6, 2002 to February 28, 2009.

HRSA is one of 11 operating divisions in the United States Department of Health and Human Services (HHS). The agency uses its $7 billion annual budget (FY 2007) to expand access to quality health care for all Americans through an array of grants to state and local governments, community-based health care providers, and health professions training programs. These HRSA-supported grantees provide direct health care services to 20 million people each year.

Duke led HRSA's implementation of President Bush's Health Center Initiative, which has created or expanded 1,100 service delivery sites since 2001 and boosted the number of patients served annually at health centers from about 10 million in 2001 to 15 million in 2006. HRSA-supported health centers deliver high-quality preventive and primary care to patients regardless of their ability to pay at 4,000 sites across the United States.

HRSA recently implemented another Presidential initiative meant to extend health center services to an estimated 300,000 residents in some of America's poorest counties. Eighty grants worth more than $40 million were awarded in August 2007 to bring the benefits of health centers to low-income counties that do not currently have access to health center care.

Duke also led federal efforts to boost organ donation. Since 2003, the HRSA-sponsored Organ Donation Breakthrough Collaborative has brought together donation professionals and hospital leaders to share ways to raise donation rates in their facilities to 75 percent of eligible organ donors. Since then, the number of hospitals achieving the 75 percent goal has increased from 55 to 301, and a record 29,000 transplant operations took place in 2006, up from 19,000 in 1995.

At HRSA, Duke also administered:

- the $2.1 billion Ryan White program, which give more than 500,000 low-income people living with HIV/AIDS the medication and care they need to get better or stay well;
- maternal and child health block grants that states use to fight infant illness and mortality by supporting health care for pregnant women and their babies;
- a range of programs that train health care workers and place them in areas where they are in short supply; and
- cost-saving networks of care among rural health care providers.

Inside HRSA, Duke worked hard to make the agency more cohesive. She created a single agency-wide process for handling grant applications and awards and she streamlined the way HRSA communicates with the public and Congress.

Additionally, Duke created the HRSA Scholars Program in 2001 to attract talented new employees in supporting the agency's mission of expanding access to quality health care for all Americans. Its cornerstone is a year-long training and development curriculum that rotates scholars among four program and administrative areas. Duke created the program after viewing staffing forecasts showing that many of HRSA's most experienced employees soon would be eligible for retirement. Another Scholar class entered HRSA in September 2007; the 250 graduates of the Scholar program now on staff at the agency represent more than a tenth of the agency's total workforce.

== Professional background ==
Before coming to HRSA, Duke served as deputy assistant secretary for administration in another HHS operating division, the Administration for Children and Families (ACF) . In that post, she was in charge of grants policy, financial management, internal and state systems, human resources and administrative functions.

Duke also has more than 12 years of experience as both acting assistant secretary and principal deputy in HHS' Office of the Assistant Secretary for Management and Budget (OASMB) – currently called the Office of Resources and Technology, which includes HHS' chief financial officer, management control officer and chief information officer.

She oversaw major organizational changes carried out within the framework of the Department's Continuous Improvement Program, reinvention efforts to streamline HHS personnel, and an initiative focusing on regional restructuring. In the mid-1990s, she led the Department in implementing the Congressional mandate to separate the Social Security Administration from HHS –an effort that saw no personnel grievances filed.

In 2003, Duke was elected as a fellow of the National Academy of Public Administration.

In 2006, Duke received a Presidential Rank Award of Distinguished Executive, the most prestigious award offered by a U.S. President to Federal senior executives and professionals. She was one of only six 2006 award recipients from the Department of Health and Human Services.

Duke entered Federal service at the Office of Personnel Management (OPM), where she rose to the rank of deputy assistant director and director of policy and systems in OPM's Office of Training and Development from 1984-86. From 1978-84, she was director of the Government Affairs Institute in OPM's Office of Executive and Management Development. The institute trains Federal executives in such responsibilities as testifying before Congress, developing budgets and managing large bureaucracies. Before joining the government, Duke was a professor of political science and spent two years as a research writer for Congressional Quarterly, a Washington, D.C.-based publication that covers Capitol Hill and Federal agencies.

In 2009 Duke joined the faculty of the University of Maryland School of Public Policy where she is currently the Florence Brody Family Foundation Public Policy Forum Professor.

== Education ==
Duke earned a bachelor's degree in political science from Douglass College of Rutgers University, a master's degree in political science and African studies from Northwestern University, and a doctorate in political science from George Washington University. She stays connected to academia by teaching political science and American government courses at Washington-area universities and by mentoring graduate students.
