= Caseworker =

Type of social worker

In social work, a caseworker is someone who is employed by a government agency, nonprofit organization, or another group to take on the cases of individuals and provide them with advocacy, information and solutions. They are sometimes, but not always, also a social worker. Also, in political arenas, caseworkers are employed as a type of legislative staffer by legislators to provide service to their constituents such as dealing with individual or family concerns. A social worker who works as a caseworker obtains social casework education and training naturally through their compulsory degree works. In social work, casework means to engage a client in learning their situation, to build a suitable plan of action, and helping the client to solve their problems through client commitment and use of their own and community resources, the coordinated service is called case management. British MPs and members of the United States Congress often provide constituent services through caseworkers for better use of their allotted funds.

== History of the term ==
The history of social casework is closely tied to the advent of social work as a general professional discipline. In the late nineteenth century, the formation of the Charity Organization Society, and the Settlement movement represented the beginning of efforts towards alleviating industrial poverty. While social casework was a primary method of intervention, it was not until Mary Richmond published Social Diagnosis in 1917 that a formal definition for social casework began to formulate. In Social Diagnosis, Richmond advocated for working with clients, rather than on them, and for gaining "sympathetic understanding of the old world backgrounds from which the client came" in lieu of making generalizations or assumptions. The term social diagnosis came to refer to "a systematic way for helping professionals to gather information and study client problems" based on each client's unique background, problems, and individualized needs.

== Social casework ==
Social casework is the method employed by social workers to help individuals find solutions to problems of social adjustment that are difficult for individuals to navigate on their own.

Social casework is a primary approach and a method of social work, concerned with the adjustment and development of the individual and, in some instances, couples for leading them as a unit towards more satisfying human relations. In social casework, the relationship between a caseworker and their client is one of support, focused on "enabling an individual in solving a problem through self-efforts." The social casework relationship is a dynamic interaction of attitudes and emotions between the social caseworker and the client with the purpose of satisfying the clients psychosocial needs to achieve a better intrapersonal (interactions and transactions) adjustment within their respective environment. Psychosocial assessment is a key tool used in casework; it is the initial assessment of a client's current, relevant past, and an inquiry to possible future modes of adaptation in both stressful situations and normal living situations. Problem solving is the intent behind every social casework process; the caseworker doesn't solve the problem for the client, but helps the person in the situation to be equipped in solving or facing the problem adequately within the individual's weaknesses and strengths to the end of overall development.

=== Principles in social casework ===
There are seven principles in a casework relationship. They are:

1. Recognizing individualistion and uniqueness of the client.
2. Recognition of purposeful expression of clients feelings.
3. Controlled emotional response with sensitivity to clients' transference and its meaning and function.
4. Complete acceptance of clients for realistic problem solving.
5. Maintaining a nonjudgmental attitude towards the client and the underlying causative factors, while employing a consequentialist approach to modify the attitudes, standards, and actions of the clients in order to facilitate effective changes in their present and future.
6. Recognizing and motivating clients' self-determination, the freedom of making their own choices and decisions to see and use appropriate resources for their problems, and using positive and constructive self-direction.
7. Confidentiality about client details for effective casework service, and sharing of information only with client's consent for providing an integrative agency service.

=== Values in social casework ===
The social casework profession is focused on one primary goal: "to enhance human well-being and help meet the basic human needs of all people, with particular attention to the needs and empowerment of people who are vulnerable, oppressed, and living in poverty." Values maintained in casework are:

1. Every individual has inherent worth and dignity.
2. Every individual has the right to self-determination.
3. Every individual is the primary concern of society, has potential for and the right to growth.
4. Every individual, in turn, has to contribute to the society's development by assuming his social responsibility.
5. The individual and society in which one lives are interdependent.
6. Basic human needs have to be met by services which are not dependent upon in accord either to moral behaviour or to race, nationality, or caste.

=== Stages in social casework process ===
The stages are:

- Intake and Rapport building/ initials
- Clinical exploration of the problem/ Interview
- Assessment
- Intervention/ Treatment
- Monitoring and Evaluation
- Follow-up and
- Termination

=== Case management ===
Social work case management is a process of linking clients to services that enhance their functional capacity, from assessment to comprehensive intervention for equitable client care. According to NASW (1984) "Case management is a mechanism for ensuring a comprehensive program that will meet an individual's need for care by coordinating and linking components of a service delivery system." It is a collaborative process of assessment, planning, facilitation, and advocacy for options and services to meet an individual's health needs through communication and provision of available resources to promote qualitative cost effective outcomes. Here, health needs are within the social model of health which includes addressing the social and environmental determinants of health-the psycho-social, recreational, cultural and language needs in tandem with physical/biological and medical factors. These needs are defined by a problem's context, formulation, and definition.

Case management has alternatively been known as "service coordination" or "care coordination" since the late 1980s. Care coordination is defined by NASW as "a client-centered, assessment based, interdisciplinary approach to integrating health care and psychosocial support services in which a care coordinator develops and implements a comprehensive care plan that addresses the client's needs, strengths, and goals." There are two types of case management one is based on objective aims of the service organization and the other is dependent on the individual or group who benefits the service. Case management differs from one setting to another depending upon the policies, tolerance and objectives however efficiency in services is a common element. An element that affects efficiency is caseloads. Department of Children and Families, United States recommended no more than 12–15 open/active cases and 8–10 new referrals per month when it comes to caseload and efficient management of workload. This allocation of caseload management showed 90% efficiency in services and quality of practice by Center for the Study of Social Policy (CSSP), 2009. A general work load hours that takes for Case management is 3.30 hrs in which 1.45 hrs takes for case intake; Traditional individual – family assessment takes 3.45 hrs – 12.45 hrs as per Minnesota Workload Analytics for evidence based stabilizing and strengthening the workforce. To increase handling caseloads over-hiring and expanding employee benefits is a practice used by social services. A survey done by the Arizona's Department of Economic Security showed increasing caseload size above 35 cases per caseworker a month attracted repeated maltreatment reports and the ideal clients per case manager ratio suggested is 10:1. To reduce the caseload size they focused on expanding prevention services which showed a positive effect. The larger the caseload, the less direct care there will be, and the services will tend to be more reactive to presented needs or simply brokerage services and crisis management. They won't be anticipatory and proactive. Before the 2000s, an ideal estimate for caseload sizes in child welfare cases was typically fewer than twenty. For chronic psychiatric cases, it ranged from fifteen to thirty, and in some cases, it could go as high as 40 to 50 or even more. The actual caseload size depended on several factors, such as the client's specific needs, how often they required assistance, the number of staff available, how far apart the clients were geographically, whether services were provided at home or an agency, and other similar factors. Additionally, it varied based on the type of program, the established processes within the agency, the agency's size or stage of development, and how well duties were delegated within a Case Management team. Case management is a part of direct social work practice, it involves development and implementation of the case plan and administration of case management systems for effective service delivery. This makes the case manager involve in resource development, service management, lean leadership, cost control, resource distribution, and use of authority. Due to the resource control aspect a Case manager's activity is also known as service management.

The generic phases of case management are similar to the casework process:

- Screening and rapport building
- Psycho-social assessment and problem conceptualization
- Care planning within the prioritization of needs
- Specific resource allocation
- Implementation of a plan, establishing a written contract and service co-ordination
- Monitoring and review
- Termination/Closure or re-assessment

Tasks of case management include:

- Conducting an intake interview of the client and their family to assess eligibility for services.
- Conducting a detailed interview, cross checking previous service history, and creating a psychosocial assessment.
- Designing a service plan in consultation with the client and their family through using agency networks and resources, and clients resources.
- Monitoring the plan is to ensure smooth and coordinated momentum and to confirm its goal orientation by being a liaison between subsystems or programs that the client and the family have preferred, also providing education on how to effectively utilize complex services.
- Conducting progress meetings to ensure and strengthen the client and their family in progressing toward their goals, and serving as a liaison agent to resolve any unexpected service issues or problems with service providers.
- Preparing documentation to record client progress and adherence to the plan.
- Establish and maintain good professional relations with resource systems while also negotiating the purchase of new service contracts for present and future clients.
- Maintain the organizational authority and establish the managerial role in service coordination by modifying and developing policies and procedures to create effective services, and by securing the respect and support of those in positions that are influential to the case management process.

In case management practice there are different models used:

1. Case management – Assessment, monitoring, referral and coordination plus direct service role.
2. Case monitoring model – Assessment, monitoring, referral and coordination only.
3. Brokerage – Assessment, sub-contract/support services, monitor outcomes.
4. Advocacy – Assessment, advocate for services, monitor outcomes.
5. Managerial case management – Reviewing assessment and management plans submitted by caseworkers, monitoring costs, authorizing expenditure.

== Multicultural prevalence and acceptability ==
Caseworkers are employed by a large number of organizations in Britain, especially in the voluntary and public sectors. In the United States, most government agencies that provide social services to children in poor or troubled families have a staff of caseworkers, each of whom is assigned a proportion of the cases under review at any given time. In Australia, caseworkers may be assigned to work in child protection, drug and alcohol services or community health organizations. As of 2004, there were approximately 876,000 child welfare caseworkers in the United States. Seventy-two percent are women, and the mean salary for all caseworkers was $64,590.

== See also ==
- Constituent services in the United States
- Clare Winnicott
- Mary Richmond
- Otto Rank
- Social group work
- Wellness Recovery Action Plan
