= Wright Laboratory =

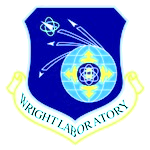
- Emblem of the Wright Laboratory
- Active: 1990–October 1997
- Country: United States
- Branch: Air Force
- Role: Research and development
- Part of: Air Force Systems Command (1990-1992); Air Force Materiel Command (1992-1997)
- Garrison/HQ: Wright-Patterson AFB, Ohio

Wright Laboratory was a research and development organization operated by the United States Air Force Materiel Command on Wright-Patterson AFB starting in 1990. The Laboratory was eventually merged into the Air Force Research Laboratory in 1997.

The Laboratory was named after the Wright brothers, American pioneers of aviation and the namesake of Wright-Patterson AFB.

Air Force Laboratories Before and After Merger
Pre-Merger	Post-Merger
Avionics Laboratory, Wright-Patterson AFB, OH	Wright Laboratory; Wright-Patterson AFB
Electronics Technology Laboratory, Wright-Patterson AFB, OH	Wright Laboratory; Wright-Patterson AFB
Flight Dynamics Laboratory, Wright-Patterson AFB, OH	Wright Laboratory; Wright-Patterson AFB
Material Laboratory, Wright-Patterson AFB, OH	Wright Laboratory; Wright-Patterson AFB
Aero Propulsion and Power Laboratory; Wright-Patterson AFB, OH	Wright Laboratory; Wright-Patterson AFB
Armament Laboratory, Eglin AFB, FL	Wright Laboratory; Wright-Patterson AFB
