= National Space Club =

American non-profit organization

The National Space Club is a non-profit corporation in the US which contains representatives of industry, government, educational institutions and private individuals in order to enhance the exchange of information on astronautics, and to relay this information to the public. It provides scholarships and internships to students, and encourages educational space based activities. The Club promotes space leadership by the United States, the advancement of space technology, and recognizes and honors people who have contributed significantly to the fields of rocketry and astronautics. The Club fulfills these objectives with scholarships, grants, internships, luncheons, the Goddard Memorial Dinner, and newsletters.

== Origin ==
The National Space Club (originally organized as the National Rocket Club) was founded on October 4, 1957, as a club to stimulate the exchange of ideas and information about rocketry and astronautics, and to promote the recognition of United States achievements in space.

== Awards ==
The Goddard Memorial Dinner is the annual awards banquet honoring the late Dr. Robert H. Goddard. During the night, ten awards and one scholarship are presented. The awards include:

- Robert H. Goddard Trophy
- Dr. Joseph Charyk Award
- NOAA David Johnson Award
- Olin E. Teague Memorial Award
- Space Educator Award
- Astronautics Engineer Award
- Nelson P. Jackson Award
- Press Award
- Eagle Manned Mission Award
- General Bernard Schriever Award

== Scholarship ==
The National Space Club offers a major scholarship each year to encourage study in the field of engineering and science. The scholarship, in the amount of $10,000, is awarded to a U.S. citizen in at least the junior year of an accredited university, who, in the judgment of the award committee, shows the greatest interest and aptitude.

The National Space Club cooperates in the sponsorship of a number of summer internships at the NASA Goddard Space Flight Center, and its Wallops Flight Facility. The National Space Clubs Scholars Program is open to graduating high school sophomores, juniors, and seniors who have demonstrated an interest and ability in space technologies.
