= Presidential Rank Awards =

United States award to civil servants

The Presidential Rank Awards program is an individual award program granted by the United States government to career Senior Executive Service (SES) members and Senior Career Employees within the OPM–allocated Senior-Level (SL) or Scientific-Professional (ST) community. The awards have been given annually by the president of the United States since the establishment of the Senior Executive Service in 1978 except for a brief period of suspension from 2013 to 2014. The Presidential Rank Award honors high-performing senior career employees for "sustained extraordinary accomplishment." Executives from across government are nominated by their agency heads, evaluated by citizen panels, and designated by the president. Winners of these awards are deemed to be "strong leaders", professionals, or scientists who "achieve results" and "consistently demonstrate strength, integrity, industry, and a relentless commitment to excellence in public service".

These awards were suspended by President Obama in 2013 in favor of some non-monetary recognition because of the U.S. budget sequestration in 2013. In 2014, Obama announced the reinstatement of the Presidential Rank Awards programs.

== Senior Executive Service (SES) ==
=== Distinguished Executive ===
The Presidential Rank Award of Distinguished Executive is the highest annual award for career SES members. Prior to 1999, Distinguished Executives received a lump-sum payment of $20,000. Congress raised the amount of the Distinguished Executive awards granted in 1999 to 35% of the executive's annual salary. All recipients also receive a framed Distinguished certificate featuring a gold emblem signed by the president and a gold Rank Award pin.

No more than 1% of the career Senior Executive Service corps can receive the Distinguished Executive Rank Award in a given year. Of the U.S. government's 1.8 million civilian employees, only 6,800 have risen to be career Senior Executives.

=== Meritorious Executive ===
The Presidential Rank Award of Meritorious Executive is the second-highest annual award given to selected career SES members. The award may be given to no more than 5% of the members of the SES in any given year. Meritorious Rank Award recipients receive 20% of basic pay, a framed Meritorious certificate featuring a silver emblem signed by the president and a silver Rank Award pin.

== Senior Career Employees (SL/ST) ==
In 2001, Congress first authorized Rank Awards for Senior Professionals, with designations, criteria and tangible awards similar to those for Senior Executives. The first such awards were given in 2003.

=== Distinguished Senior Professional ===
The Presidential Rank Award of Distinguished Senior Professional is highest annual award for SL/ST career professionals. It may be awarded to no more than 1% of the members of the SL/ST corps in a given year. Recipients receive a cash award of 35% of their salary, a framed Distinguished certificate featuring a gold emblem signed by the U.S. President and a gold Rank Award pin.

=== Meritorious Senior Professional ===
The Presidential Rank Award of Meritorious Senior Professional is awarded annually to selected SL/ST career professionals. It may be awarded to no more than 5% of the members of the SL/ST corps in a given year. Meritorious Rank Award recipients receive 20% of basic pay, a framed Meritorious certificate featuring a silver emblem signed by the U.S. President and a silver Rank Award pin.

== See also ==
- Awards and decorations of the United States government
