= Eugene Tu =

American aerospace engineer

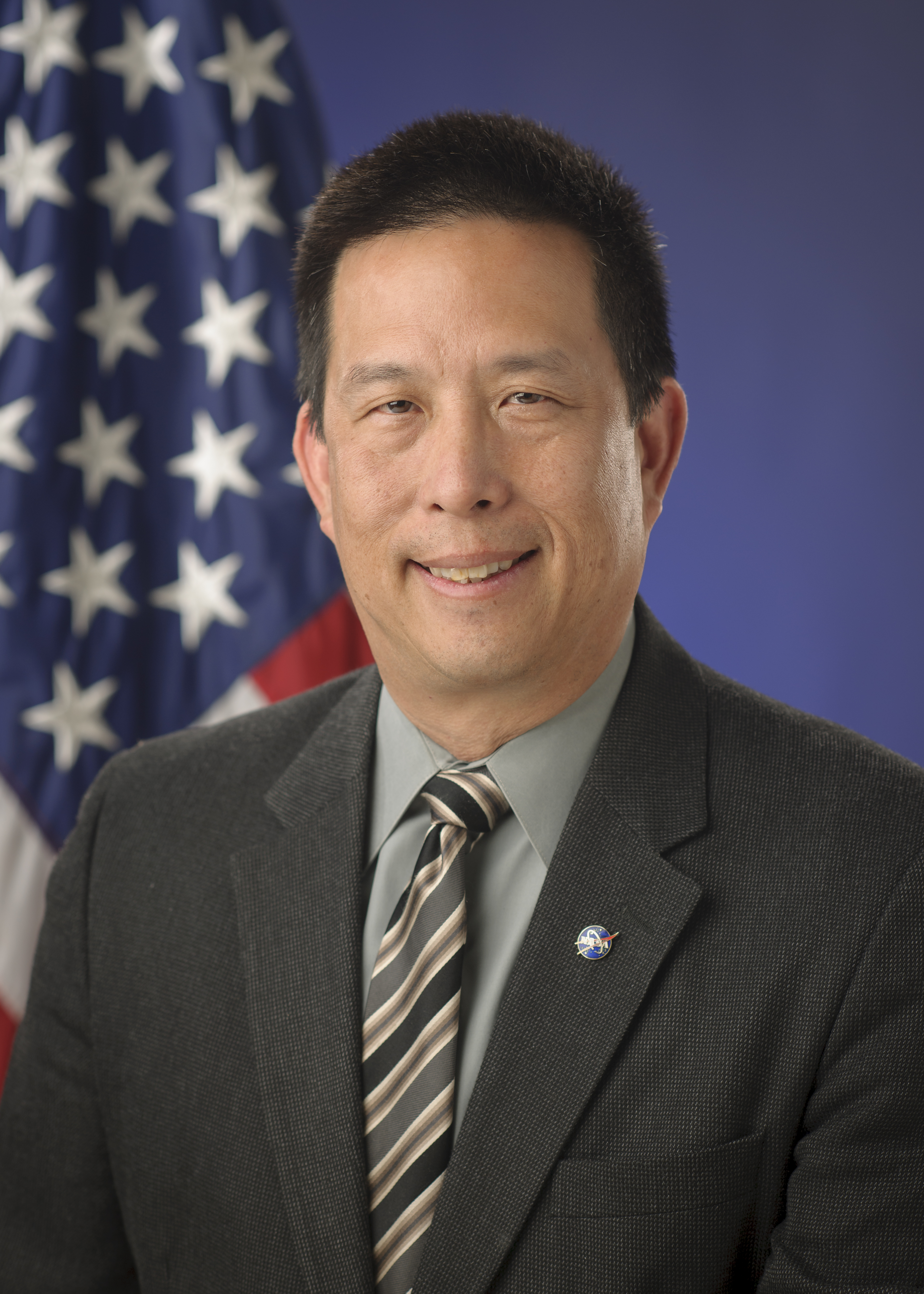
- Portrait in 2015
- Born: September 1, 1964 (age 62)
- Occupation: Aerospace engineer
- Awards: NASA Outstanding Leadership Medal (2000)

Academic background
- Education: University of California, Berkeley (BS); Stanford University (MS, PhD)
- Thesis: Numerical study of steady and unsteady canard-wing-body aerodynamics (1996)

Eugene L. Tu (born September 1, 1964) is an American aerospace engineer. Since May 4, 2015, he is the eleventh director of NASA's Ames Research Center at Moffett Field, California.

== Early life and education ==
Tu was born in 1964 to a Chinese-American family. He attended the University of California, Berkeley, where he received a Bachelor of Science in mechanical engineering in 1988. He attended Stanford University, where he earned a Master of Science in aeronautics and astronautics in 1990 and a doctorate in 1996. His thesis dealt with computational aerodynamic analysis of the effects of canards on lifting bodies.

== Career ==
Tu first joined NASA as a research scientist studying steady and turbulent flow on aircraft configurations using computational fluid dynamics (CFD). He also worked in the computational aerodynamics and high-performance computing programs before being selected in 1997 as deputy program manager for NASA's IT Base Research program. The next year, he also became program manager for NASA's High-Performance Computing and Communications (HPCC) program. The two programs were merged into the NASA Computing, Information, and Communication Technology (CICT) program in 2001, and Tu was selected as its first program manager.

He was selected for the Senior Executive Service (SES) candidate development program in 2002. The next year, he joined the Office of Biological and Physical Research at NASA Headquarters in 2003 and was the acting director for information sciences and technology at Ames in 2004. After receiving his SES certification in 2005, he was appointed the director of exploration technology at Ames in November of that year.

On May 4, 2015, Tu was appointed the eleventh center director for Ames Research Center, succeeding Pete Worden. He leads four technology research and development divisions, including the consolidated Arc Jet Complex and the supercomputing facility at Ames. He also directed the establishment of an innovation hub at Ames, a joint-venture with private companies drawing more than US$2 billion.

He is a board member of the California Council on Science and Technology since 2016 and is an associate fellow of the American Institute of Aeronautics and Astronautics.

== Awards ==
- NASA Outstanding Leadership Medal (2000)
- NASA Ames Honor Award for Outstanding Supervisor/Manager (2007)
- Presidential Rank Award for Meritorious Executive (2009)
- Chabot Space and Science Center Champion of Science (2019)
- Presidential Rank Award for Distinguished Executive (2020)
- Asian American Engineer of the Year, Chinese Institute of Engineers USA (2022)
