= Smith J. DeFrance =

American aerospace engineer

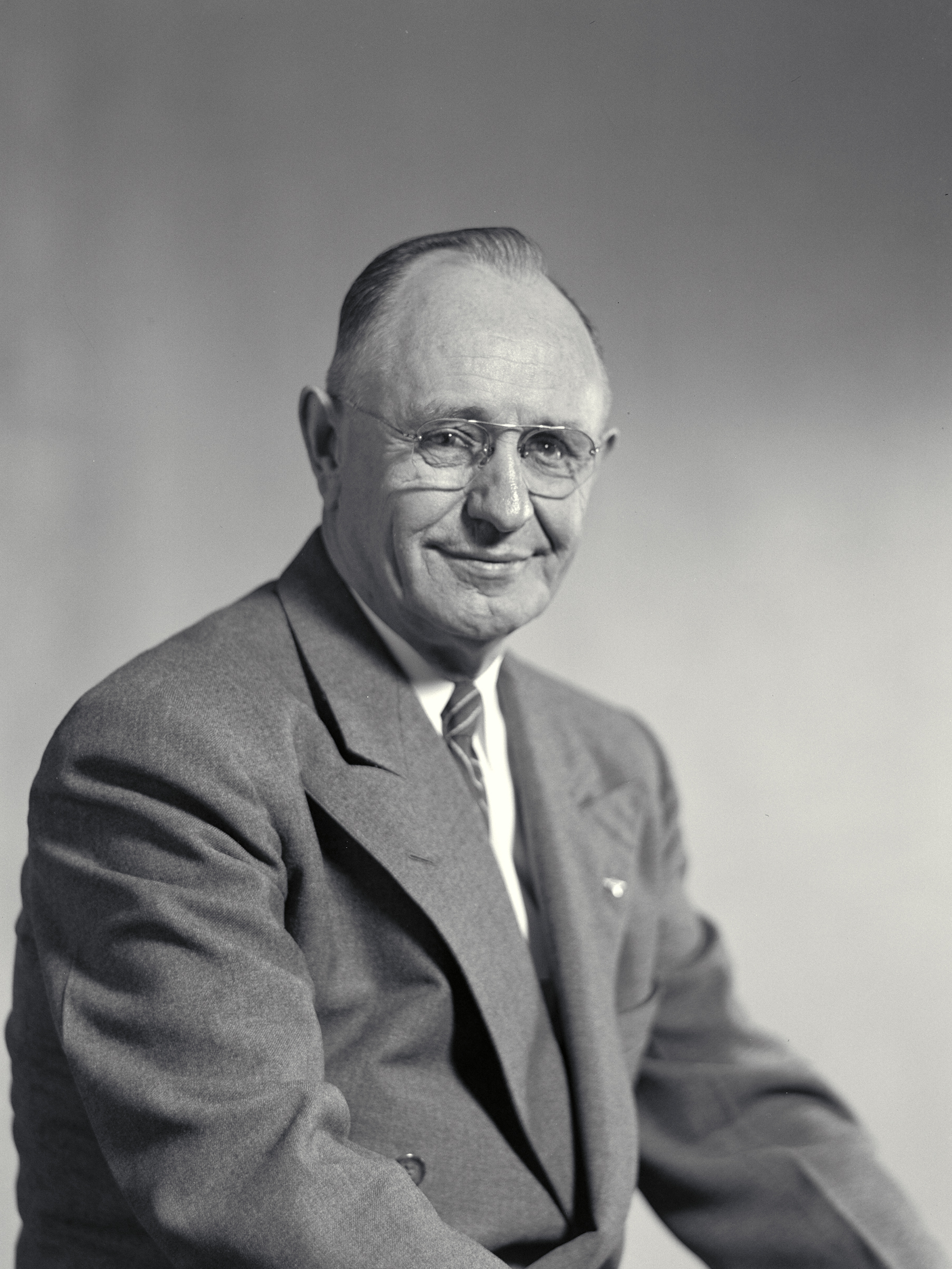
- Portrait in 1957
- Born: January 19, 1896; Battle Creek, Michigan, U.S.
- Died: March 6, 1985 (aged 89); Los Altos, California, U.S.
- Education: University of Michigan (BS)
- Occupation: Aerospace engineer
- Known for: NASA Ames Research Center
- Awards: Silver Star; NASA Outstanding Leadership Medal

Smith J. DeFrance (January 19, 1896 – March 6, 1985) was an American aerospace engineer. He was the first director of NASA's Ames Research Center from 1940 to 1965.

== Early life and education ==
Smith “Smitty” J. DeFrance was born in Battle Creek, Michigan on January 19, 1896. During World War I, he served in the U.S. Army as a fighter pilot and flight commander with the 139th Aero Squadron. He flew the SPAD S.XIII biplane for over 800 hours over the Western Front in France. DeFrance was credited with two air-to-air victories and earned the Silver Star for gallantry. He earned a degree in aeronautical engineering from the University of Michigan, the second American university to offer the degree, in 1922.

== Career ==
DeFrance joined the National Advisory Committee for Aeronautics (NACA) in July 1922 as employee number 63. He began working at the Langley Memorial Aeronautical Laboratory. Due to an interest in electrical engineering, one of his first tasks was to design the balance system for a variable-density wind tunnel.

Soon after joining Langley, he moved to the flight test arm and gained acclaim as a test pilot. In August 1924, DeFrance crashed while flying at Curtiss JN Jenny with Steven Bromley, who was killed. DeFrance was severely wounded, losing an eye and spending nearly a year at Walter Reed Army Medical Center. He vowed to his wife never to fly again.

After the accident, DeFrance made major contributions to wind tunnel research at Langley for eighteen years. He worked on the variable density tunnel and propeller research tunnel, the first of their kind. As principal aeronautical engineer, he also helped develop the Full-Scale Wind Tunnel in May 1931, then the largest in the world. It remained operational for eighty years until being retired in 2011. He was promoted to assistant chief of aerodynamics by chief engineer Henry J. E. Reid.

In 1939, he was selected to lead planning and construction of a new NACA facility at Moffett Field, California, and in 1940 became the first chief engineer of the Ames Research Center. Many engineers at Langley followed him to the newly established center, where he served as director through the transition of NACA into NASA. Under his leadership, Ames built more than 19 major wind tunnels and conducted research in aircraft aerodynamics and spacecraft re-entry studies. In 1964, he was awarded the NASA Outstanding Leadership Medal. He led Ames until his retirement in 1965.

He died in Los Altos, California in 1985, aged 89.

== Gallery ==
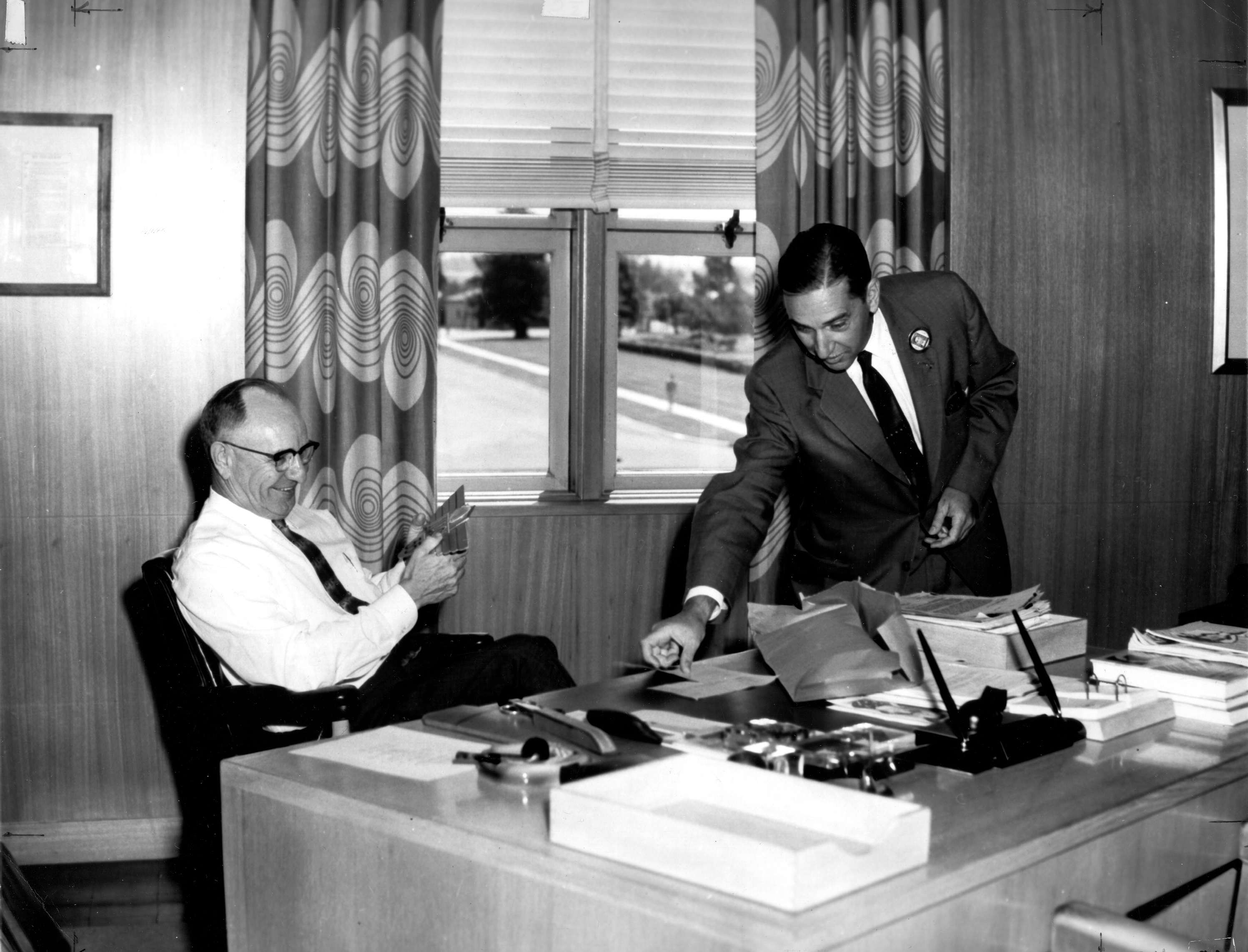
Examining NACA award for 35 years of service (1957)

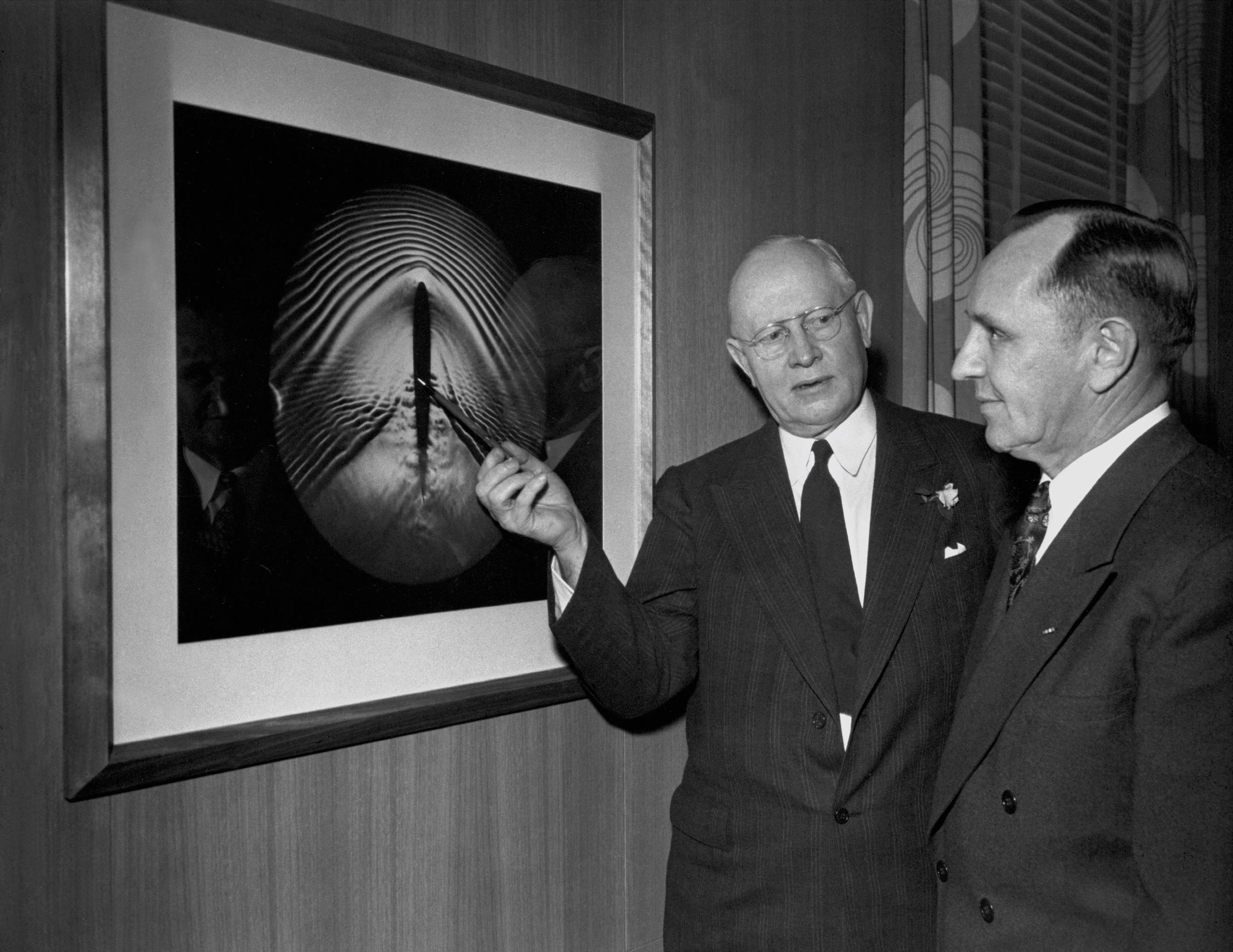
Shock wave propagation (1944)

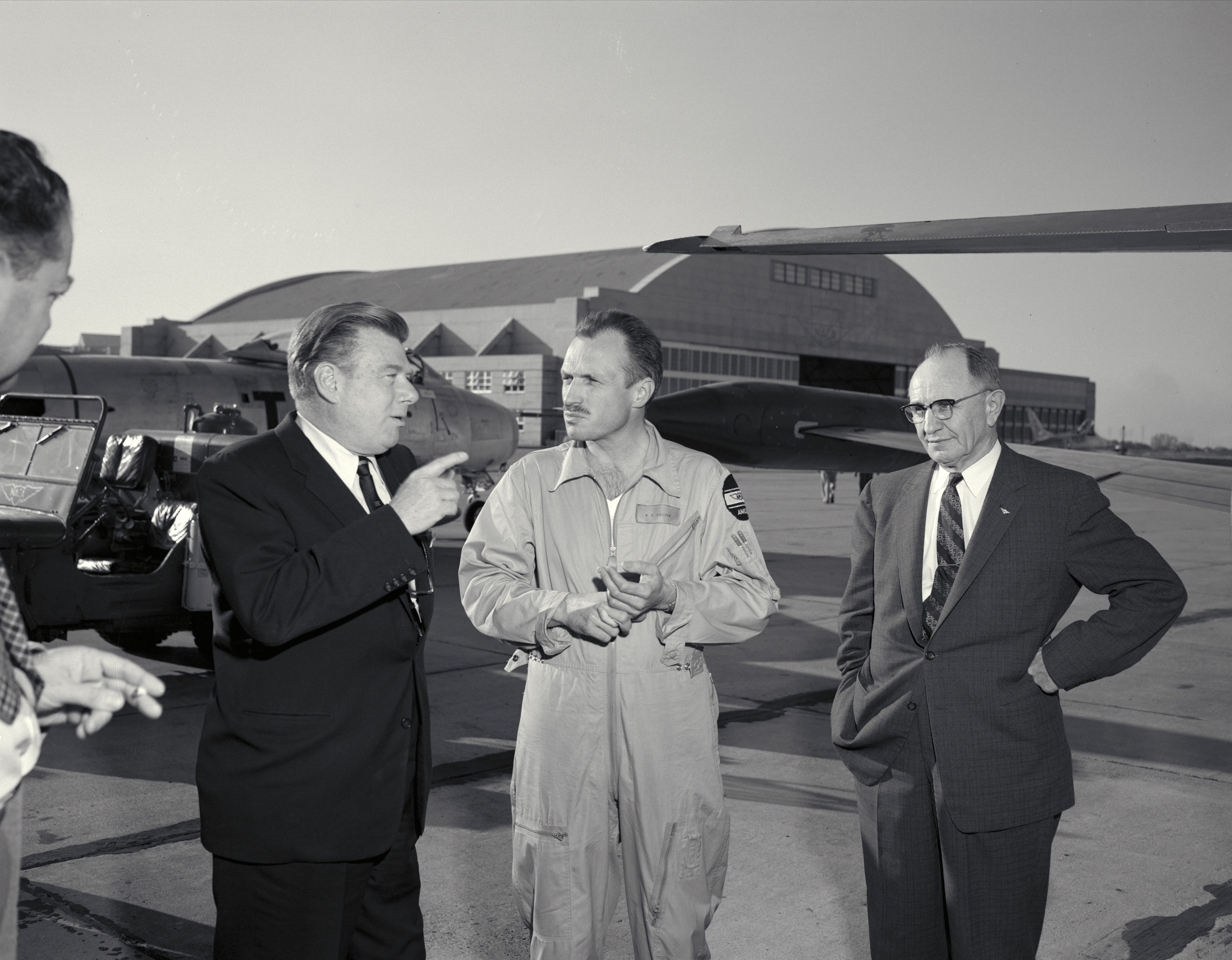
DeFrance with pilot George Cooper and TV personality Arthur Godfrey (1948)

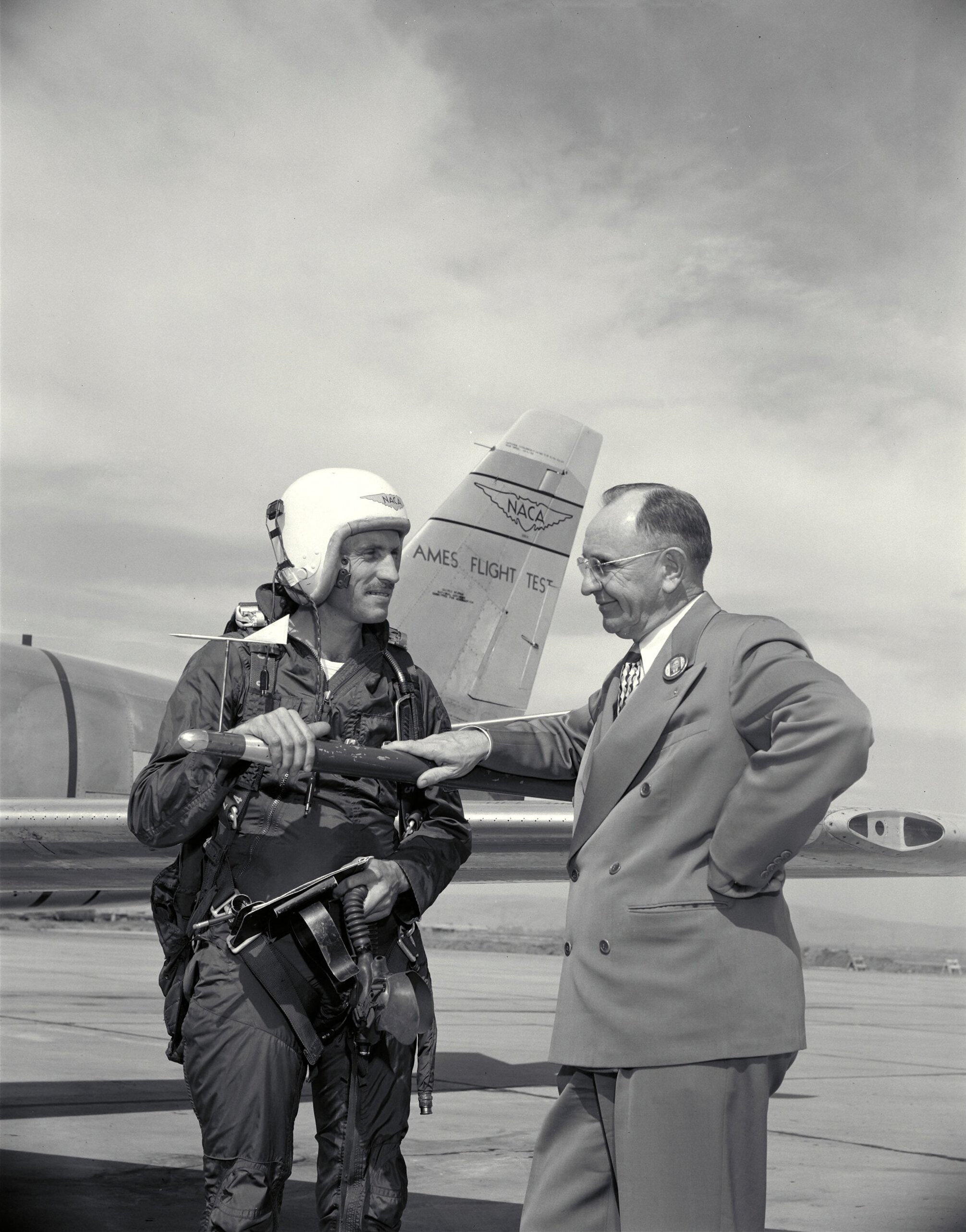
DeFrance with sound-barrier breaking test pilot George Cooper (1951)

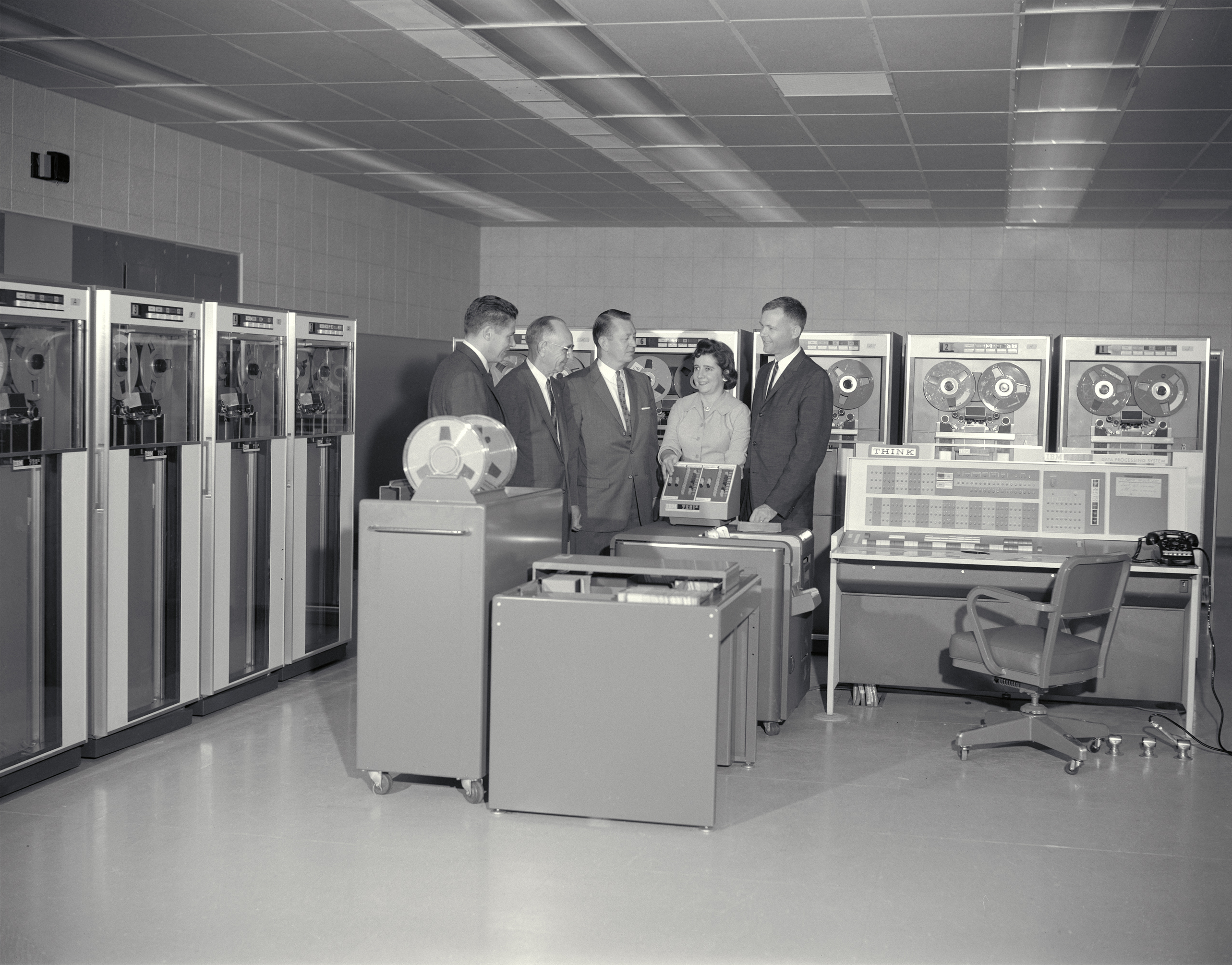
IBM 7090 computer (1961)

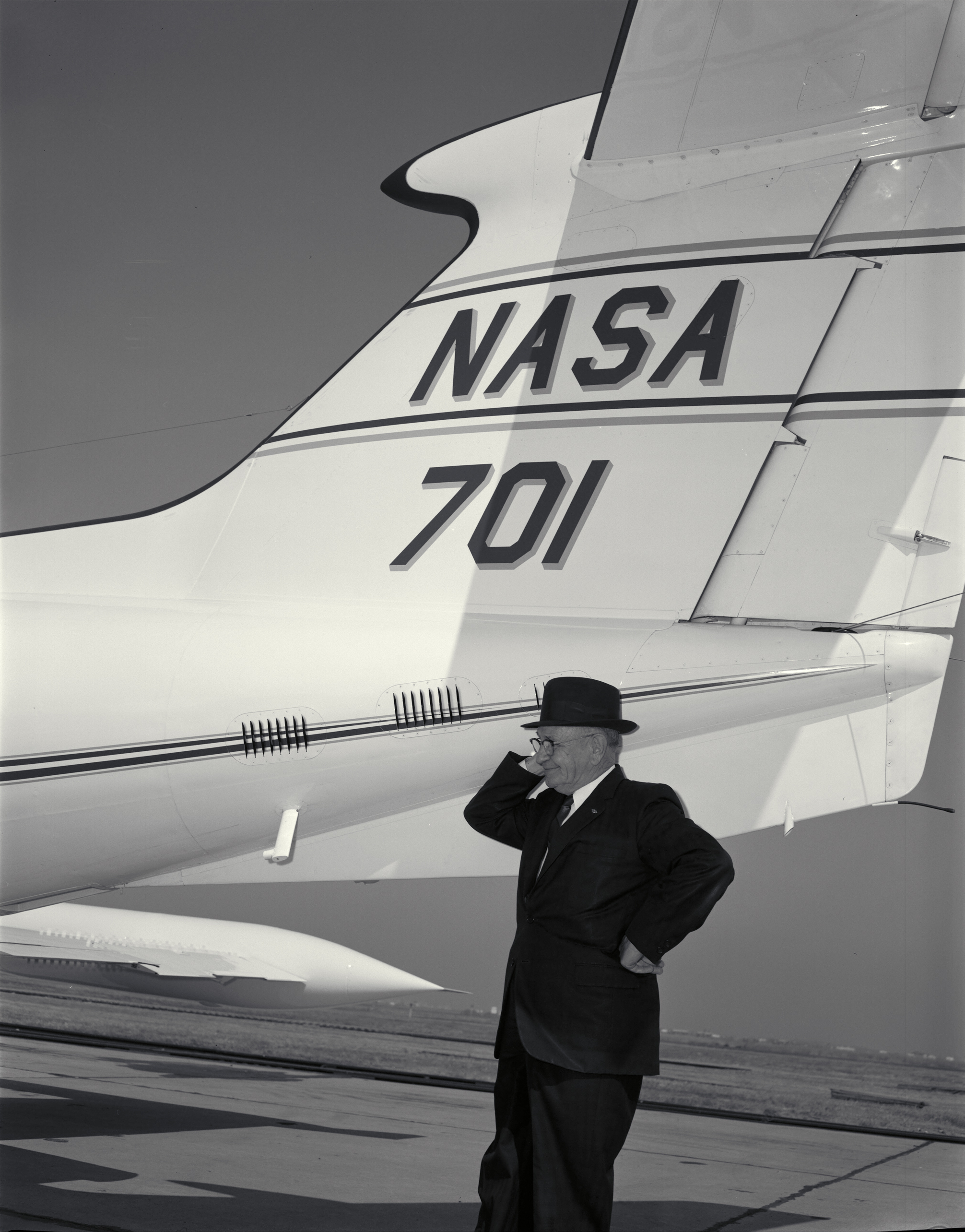
Smith J. DeFrance at the tail of an Ames Lear Jet (1965)
