= De E. Beeler =

20th-century American aerospace engineer

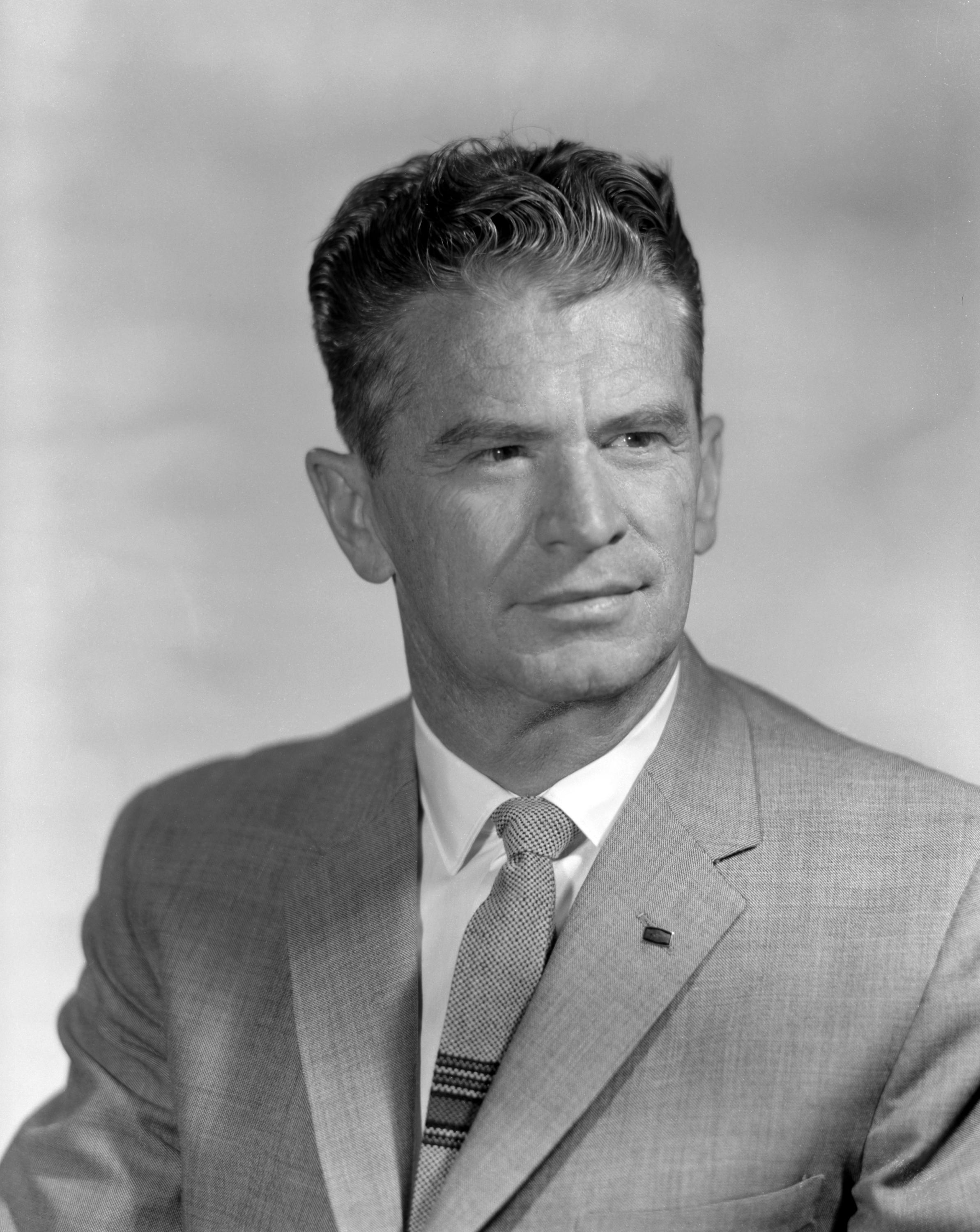
- Portrait in 1960
- Born: 1915
- Died: September 11, 2007 (aged 92); Santa Barbara, California, U.S.
- Education: Kansas State University (BS)
- Occupation: Aerospace engineer
- Years active: 1941–1974
- Known for: Bell X-1
- Spouse: Florence DeCrescenzo
- Awards: NASA Outstanding Leadership Medal (1964)

De Elroy Beeler (1915 – September 11, 2007) was an American aerospace engineer. He helped pioneer supersonic flight and served as deputy director of the Dryden Flight Research Center at NASA from 1958 to 1974 and as acting director in 1971.

== Biography ==
Beeler attended Kansas State University, earning a bachelor's degree in mechanical and aeronautical engineering in 1941. After graduating, he worked at Wright Aeronautical in Paterson, New Jersey before joining the National Advisory Committee for Aeronautics (NACA) at the Langley Memorial Aeronautical Laboratory in Hampton, Virginia later that year.

At Langley, Beeler specialized in high-speed flight research. During World War II, he served as a project engineer on the North American P-51 Mustang program. He worked under Walter C. Williams.

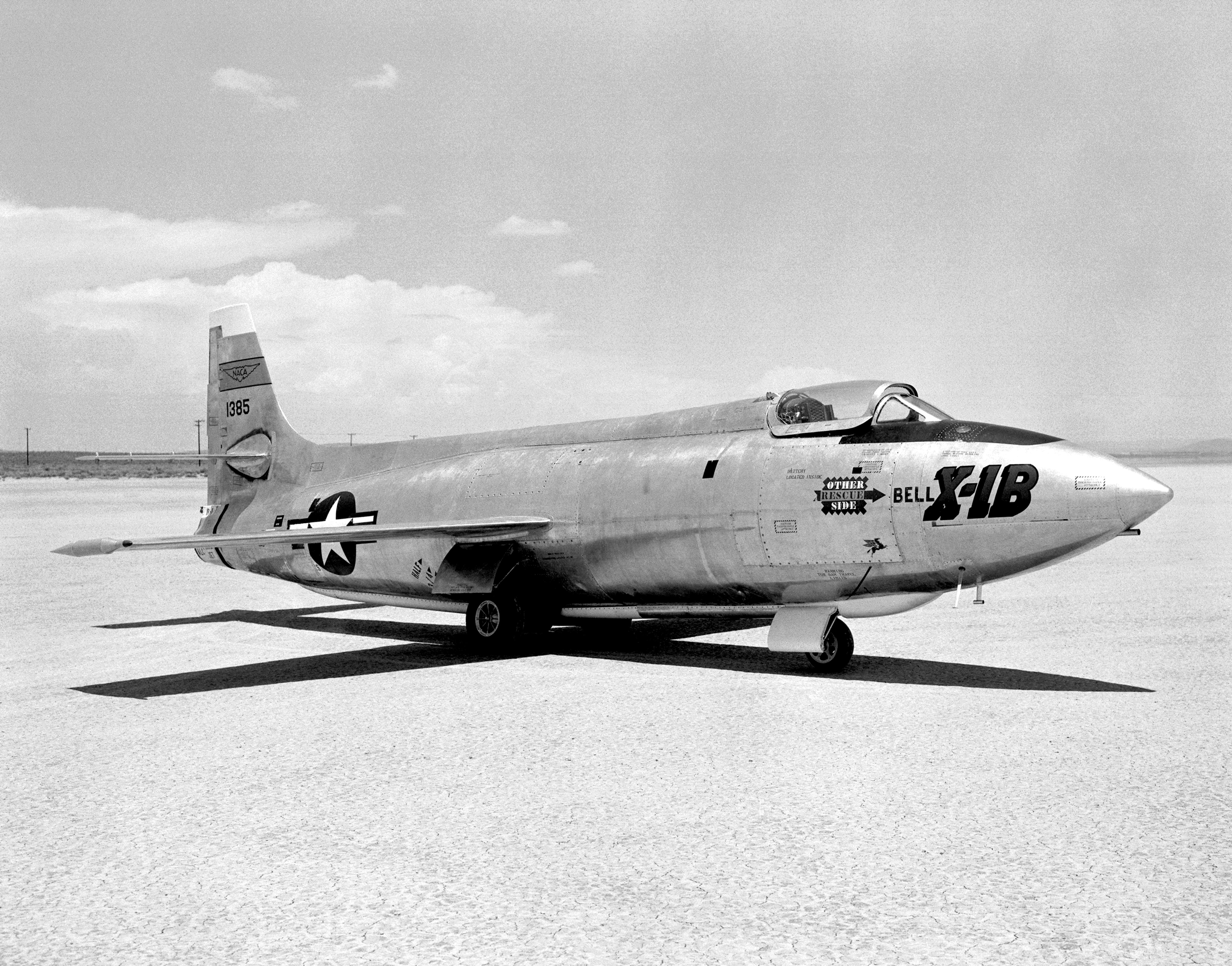
Bell X-1

In late 1946, Williams was tasked with heading the Bell X-1 program in the Mojave Desert of southern California. Williams assembled a team from Langley, including Beeler, that became the first group of NACA engineers to form the Muroc Flight Test Unit at Muroc Army Airfield. Beeler joined as William's chief assistant in January of 1947. He led the aerodynamic loads team as a program engineer. Within a year of joining Muroc, Beeler became head of engineering for the X-1 program. He and Williams managed their own staff and reported separately to Langley. Beeler collaborated with the U.S. Army Air Forces and Bell Aircraft and worked closely with Chuck Yeager.

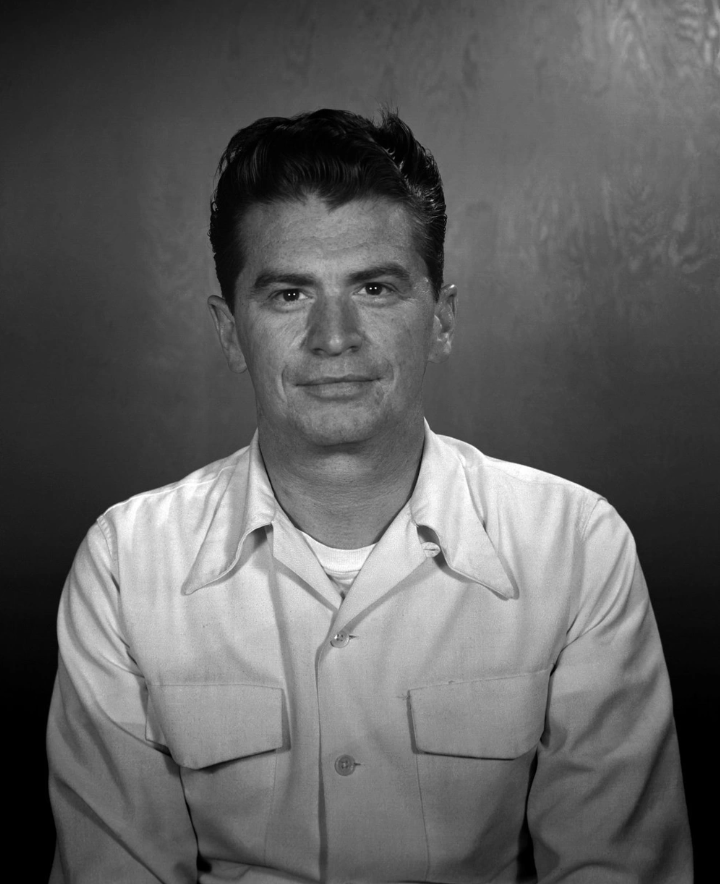
Portrait in 1949

In the 1960s, Beeler also worked on the North American X-15 program.

He served as deputy to NACA chief Walter C. Williams and NASA Armstrong director Paul Bikle. Beeler led the Research Division and headed the design and testing of advanced aircraft at the Armstrong Center for three decades.

Following Bikle's retirement, Beeler became acting director on April 27, 1971, until the appointment of Lee Scherer on October 11, 1971. He remained a deputy director under Scherer until retiring on September 27, 1974.

Beeler was an Associate Fellow of the American Institute of Aeronautics and Astronautics (AIAA) and served on the technical committee for the Apollo program. He was also on the NASA Supersonic Transport Committee and the Research Advisory Committee on Aircraft Aerodynamics.

== Personal life ==
Beeler married Florence DeCrescenzo in the 1950s. They lived in Lancaster, California as part of a community of scientists and test pilots in Antelope Valley working on supersonic flight, as depicted in the 1993 film The Right Stuff. They had two children.

After his retirement, Beeler and his wife moved to Santa Barbara, California. They sailed, were members of the Santa Barbara Lawn Bowling Club, and frequented Mammoth Mountain for jazz festivals and skiing. He lived in Santa Barbara until his death in 2007.

== Awards ==
- NASA Outstanding Leadership Medal (1964)
