= John J. Montgomery Award =

The John J. Montgomery Award was created by the National Society of Aerospace Professionals (NSAP) and the San Diego Aerospace Museum in 1962 for aerospace achievement in the United States. It was awarded from 1962 to at least 1964.

== John J. Montgomery ==
The award bears the name of John Joseph Montgomery as the first American to fly in a heavier-than-air flying machine in 1884 near San Diego, California. Montgomery later designed gliders in 1903-1905 that were used for the first high-altitude flights by man in public exhibitions at Santa Clara, California and other locations. He died in 1911 experimenting with a new glider design near San Jose, California. Montgomery was also one of the first Americans to investigate the science of aerodynamics using principles of physics.

== Recipients ==
=== 1962 ===
The NASA X-15 Program. Seven X-15 pilots and Paul F. Bikle, the then Director of NASA Flight Research Center at Edwards Air Force Base, were awarded the first John J. Montgomery Award for aerospace achievement. The pilots were: Scott Crossfield, Maj. Robert M. White, Neil A. Armstrong, John B. McKay, Joseph A. Walker, Cdr. Forrest S. Petersen, and Maj. Robert A. Rushworth.

=== 1963 ===
Project Mercury. 26 people associated with Project Mercury including astronauts M. Scott Carpenter, L. Gordon Cooper, Jr., John H. Glenn, Jr., Virgil I. Grissom, Alan B. Shepard, Jr., Donald K. Slayton, and Walter M. Schirra, Jr.; Dr. Robert R. Gilruth, MSC Director; Dr. Walter C. Williams, NASA Deputy Associate Administrator; Kenneth S. Kleinknecht, Project Mercury Manager; Christopher C. Kraft, Jr., Project Mercury Flight Operations Director; Maxime A. Faget, Assistant Director of Engineering and Development; Dr. Charles A. Berry, Medical Operations Chief; Lt. Col. John A. Powers (USAF) (nickname "Shorty"), Mercury Public Affairs Officer; and John Finley Yardley, Mercury Launch Operations Manager.

=== 1964 ===
The Polaris Program was selected from 13 candidate programs. Awardees included Charles Stark Draper, Derald Stuart, and Dr. George F. Mechlin.

== See also ==
- List of aviation awards
