= Edward Raymond Sharp =

American aeronautical and space research administrator

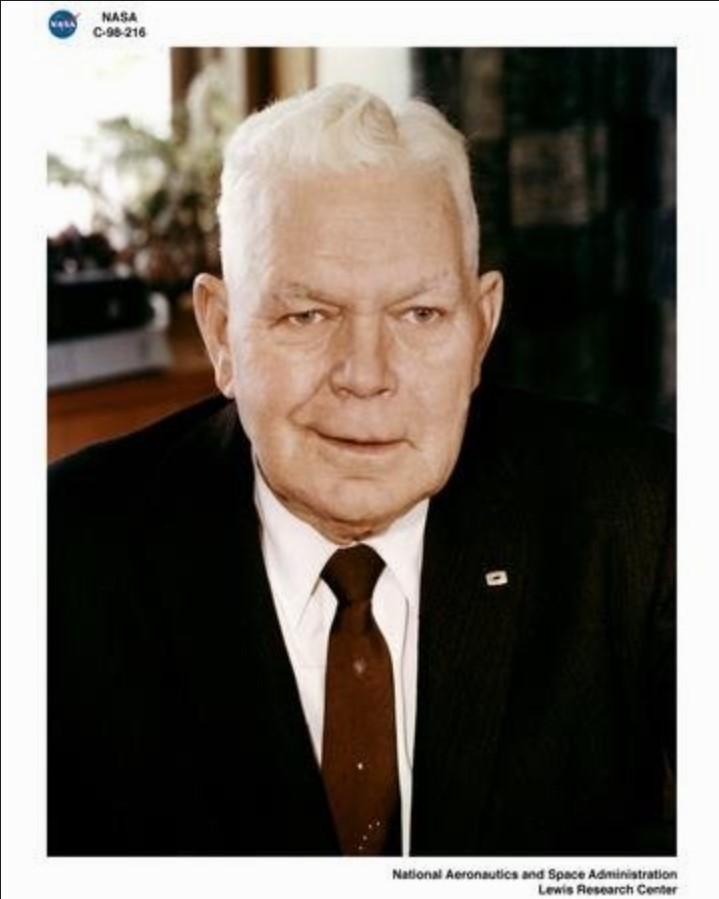
- Sharp as director of the Lewis Research Center
- Born: March 9, 1894; Elizabeth City County, Virginia, U.S.
- Died: July 24, 1961; Lakewood, Ohio, U.S.
- Education: College of William & Mary (law degree)
- Occupations: Aeronautical and space-research administrator
- Years active: 1922–1960
- Employer(s): National Advisory Committee for Aeronautics; NASA
- Known for: Establishment and early leadership of the laboratory now known as the Glenn Research Center
- Awards: Medal for Merit; NASA Outstanding Leadership Medal

Edward Raymond Sharp (March 9, 1894 – July 24, 1961), commonly known as Ray Sharp, was an American administrator in aeronautical and space research. He oversaw the construction and early operation of the Aircraft Engine Research Laboratory in Cleveland (subsequently renamed the Lewis Flight Propulsion Laboratory and the NASA Lewis Research Center) and served as manager and later director of the facility from 1942 until his retirement in 1960.

Sharp joined the National Advisory Committee for Aeronautics (NACA) in 1922 after helping reassemble the airship Roma at Langley Field. At the Cleveland laboratory, he directed construction, administration, budgeting, personnel, and relations with government and the local community, while delegating the research program to technical staff. During his tenure, the center expanded from piston-engine and propeller research into turbojet, ramjet, rocket, and nuclear-propulsion programs. Sharp served on the NACA's Special Committee on Space Technology during the transition from NACA to NASA.

== Early life and NACA career ==
Ray Sharp was born in Elizabeth City County, Virginia. He worked in shipyards along the southeastern United States as a young man, and served as a lieutenant in the United States Navy during World War I aboard the gunboat USS Sacramento. The USS Sacramento performed convoy-escort duty in the North Atlantic and Mediterranean. He returned to shipyard work following the war.

In 1922, the United States Army hired him to lead the reassembly of the Italian-built airship Roma at Langley Field. After completion of that work, the National Advisory Committee for Aeronautics hired him as hangar manager. NASA records identify him as the NACA’s 54th employee.

While working at Langley, Sharp earned a law degree from the College of William & Mary. He served as Langley’s administrative officer from 1925 to 1940, subordinate to engineer-in-charge Henry J. E. Reid. In that role, he managed administrative relations between Langley and NACA headquarters.

Sharp retired from the Naval Reserve with the rank of lieutenant commander.

In September 1940, he was named chief of Langley’s Construction Division; he transferred to California to supervise construction of the Ames Aeronautical Laboratory. However, he returned to Langley in 1941 to supervise planning and construction of the proposed Aircraft Engine Research Laboratory. He was part of the process that selected Cleveland as the site of this laboratory.

== Leadership of the Lewis laboratory ==
In August 1941, he took charge of construction of the Aircraft Engine Research Laboratory as it was over budget and behind schedule. The construction contract was taken to the White House and approved by President Franklin D. Roosevelt on December 31, and the laboratory was subsequently completed ahead of the revised schedule.

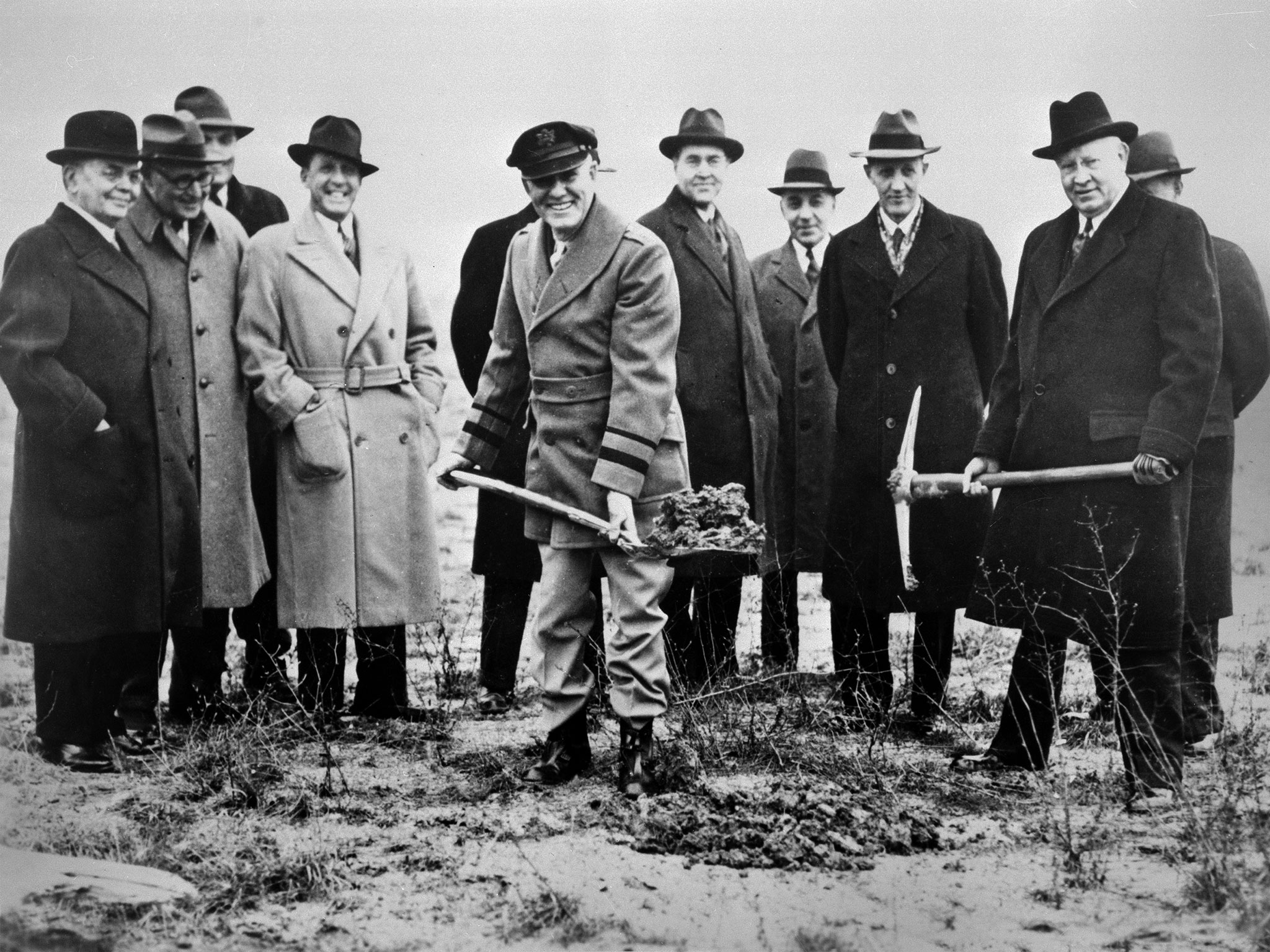
Sharp, third from left, at the January 1941 groundbreaking for the Aircraft Engine Research Laboratory in Cleveland.

He served in multiple leadership roles at the NACA Aircraft Engine Research Laboratory over the first nearly 20 years of the center, including:

- May 1942–June 1947: Manager, NACA Aircraft Engine Research Laboratory.
- June 1947–September 1948: Director, NACA Aircraft Engine Research Laboratory.
- September 1948–September 1958: Director, NACA Lewis Flight Propulsion Laboratory.
- October 1, 1958–December 31, 1960: Director, NASA Lewis Research Center.

During his time at the center, it was initially equipped for piston-engine and propeller research; however, the facilities were subsequently adapted and expanded for gas turbines and turbojet propulsion, and later into ramjets, rockets, space propulsion, and nuclear-energy research.

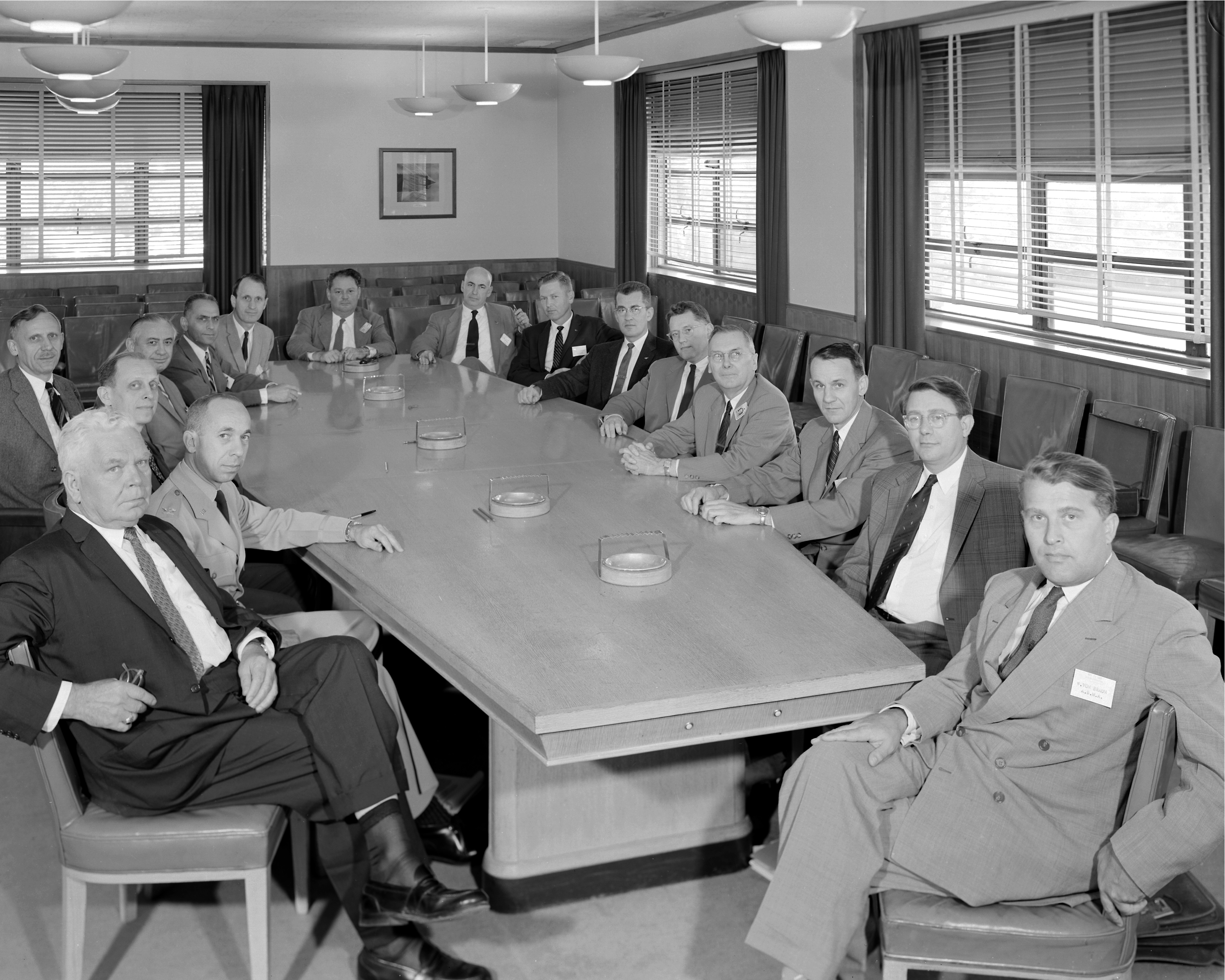
Sharp, far left, with members of the NACA Special Committee on Space Technology at Lewis Laboratory in May 1958.

Sharp supported the position that NACA should lead the emerging national space program and served on the NACA Special Committee on Space Technology, also known as the Stever Committee which helped define the NACA's role in the formation of NASA.

== Awards and honors ==
Sharp received the Medal for Merit in 1947 from President Harry S. Truman for his role in establishing and bringing the Aircraft Engine Research Laboratory into operation during World War II. At his retirement, on June 3, 1961, Sharp was presented with NASA's first Outstanding Leadership Medal by Hugh L. Dryden.. He was president of the Institute of Aeronautical Sciences in 1956 and was elected a fellow of the Royal Aeronautical Society in 1959.

He was inducted into the inaugural class of the NASA Glenn Research Center Hall of Fame in 2015.
