= Mike Gold (lawyer) =

American aerospace executive and lawyer

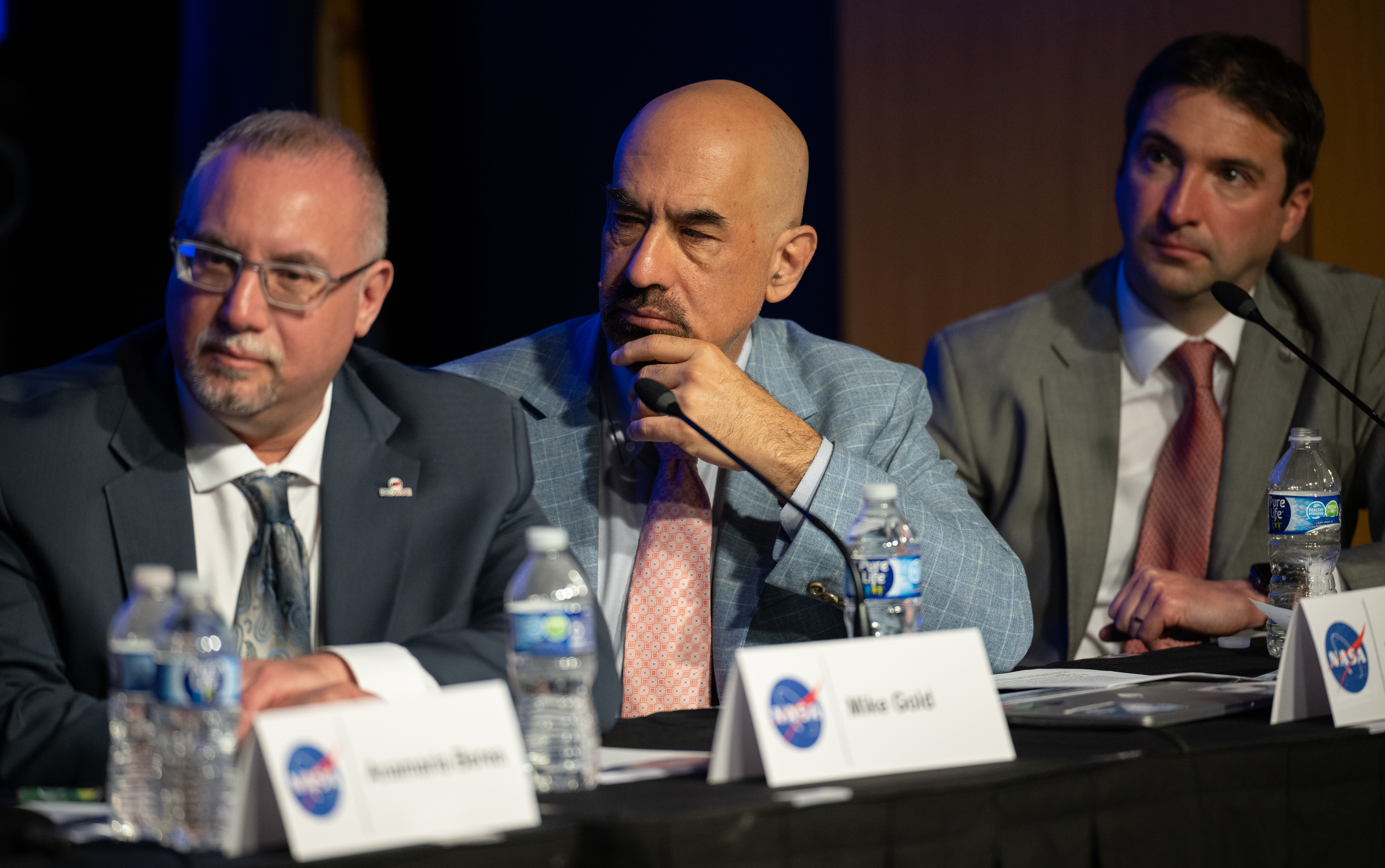
- Mike Gold (left) during a public meeting of NASA's UAP Independent Study Team in 2023
- Occupations: Aerospace executive, lawyer
- Employer: Redwire Corporation
- Known for: Artemis Accords; commercial space law; UAP research
- Title: President, Space
- Awards: NASA Outstanding Leadership Medal; IAF Excellence in International Cooperation Award

Michael Gold is an American aerospace executive and lawyer who has worked in commercial space technology and space policy. He is president of the Space segment of Redwire Corporation, also known as Redwire Space.

Gold joined Redwire in April 2021 as executive vice president of civil space business development and external affairs. He subsequently served as chief growth officer from January 2023 to March 2025 and president of Redwire's Civil and International Space business unit from April to December 2025. He became president of the company's Space segment in December 2025, with the appointment formally announced in February 2026.

Before joining Redwire, Gold held several positions at NASA, including associate administrator for space policy and partnerships, acting associate administrator for the Office of International and Interagency Relations, and senior advisor to the administrator for international and legal affairs. Before joining NASA, he worked for private space companies including Maxar Technologies and Bigelow Aerospace.

Gold was appointed to NASA's Unidentified Anomalous Phenomena Independent Study Team in 2022.

== Career ==
Before entering the commercial space industry, Gold worked at the law firms Patton Boggs and McGuireWoods. He spent approximately thirteen years at Bigelow Aerospace, where he established the company's Washington, D.C., office and oversaw the launches of the Genesis 1 and Genesis 2 experimental spacecraft. He later served as vice president of civil space at Maxar Technologies and general counsel of its Radiant Solutions business unit.

Gold joined NASA in November 2019, serving in senior international affairs and space policy roles until April 2021. He subsequently joined Redwire, where he held executive positions in business development, corporate growth, and civil and international space operations before becoming president of its Space segment.

Gold earned a bachelor's degree from Brandeis University and a Juris Doctor from the University of Pennsylvania Law School, where he founded and led the Journal of Constitutional Law.

== Achievements in space law ==
=== Artemis Accords ===
At NASA, Gold led the development and implementation of the Artemis Accords, working with the U.S. Department of State and international partners on principles for cooperation in civil space exploration. The accords are a non-binding framework addressing peaceful exploration, transparency, interoperability, emergency assistance, scientific data sharing, and the use of space resources.

The original eight signatories, which signed the accords on October 13, 2020, were Australia, Canada, Italy, Japan, Luxembourg, the United Arab Emirates, the United Kingdom, and the United States.

The number of signatory countries subsequently increased as additional governments joined the framework.

=== Other space policy work ===
Gold also led negotiations for agreements concerning the Lunar Gateway, worked on NASA's first lunar resource purchase initiative, and participated in revisions to planetary protection regulations.

Gold chaired the Commercial Space Transportation Advisory Committee from 2012 to 2019. He was appointed to the NASA Advisory Council in 2018 and chaired its Regulatory and Policy Committee.

=== Awards and recognition ===
Gold received the NASA Outstanding Leadership Medal for his work at NASA.

In 2024, he received the International Astronautical Federation's Excellence in International Cooperation Award.

The Artemis Accords were among the recipients of the 2025 Aviation Week Network Laureate Awards in the space category.

Gold was a member of NASA's Unidentified Anomalous Phenomena Independent Study Team, which received a NASA Silver Group Achievement Award. He also contributed to the Bigelow Expandable Activity Module project, which received a NASA Group Achievement Award.

== Congressional testimony on unidentified anomalous phenomena ==
On November 13, 2024, Gold testified before the Subcommittee on Cybersecurity, Information Technology, and Government Innovation and the Subcommittee on National Security, the Border, and Foreign Affairs of the United States House Committee on Oversight and Accountability during a hearing titled Unidentified Anomalous Phenomena: Exposing the Truth. Other witnesses included Tim Gallaudet, Luis Elizondo, and Michael Shellenberger.

The hearing addressed allegations of undisclosed government programs involving unidentified anomalous phenomena, including claims by some witnesses concerning recovered technology and biological material.

Gold's testimony focused on the scientific study of UAP and the role of government agencies in collecting and evaluating relevant information.
