= NASA Outstanding Leadership Medal =

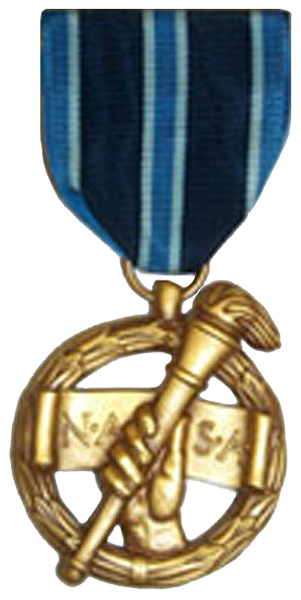
- NASA Outstanding Leadership Medal
- Type: Medal
- Country: United states
- Presented by: the National Aeronautics and Space Administration
- Eligibility: Government employees only
- Status: Active
- Established: July 29, 1959
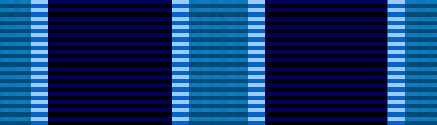
- NASA Outstanding Leadership Ribbon

Precedence
- Next (higher): Distinguished Service Medal
- Next (lower): Exceptional Achievement Medal

The NASA Outstanding Leadership Medal is awarded to US government employees only for notably outstanding leadership which affects technical or administrative programs of NASA. The leadership award may be given for an act of leadership, for sustained contributions based on a leader's effectiveness, for the productivity of the leader's program, or for the leader's demonstrated ability in developing the administrative or technical talents of other employees.

== Recipients ==
=== 1961 ===
- Edward Raymond Sharp
- Henry J. E. Reid
- Abe Silverstein

=== 1962 ===
- Paul F. Bikle
- Hartley A. Soulé
- George B. Graves Jr.
- Maxime A. Faget
- George M. Low
- John W. Townsend Jr.

=== 1963 ===
- Morton J. Stoller
- Maj. Gen. Leighton I. Davis (USAF)
- Kenneth S. Kleinknecht
- Christopher C. Kraft Jr.
- G. Merritt Preston
- Floyd L. Thompson
- D. Brainerd Holmes
- Charles J. Donlan
- Walter Haeussermann
- William A. Mrazek
- John A. Johnson

=== 1964 ===
- De E. Beeler
- Col. Robert P. Young (USA)
- Walter L. Lingle
- Wernher von Braun
- Kurt Debus
- Harry J. Goett

=== 1965 ===
- Lt. Gen. Walter K. Wilson Jr. (USA)
- Charles W. Mathews
- Oran W. Nicks
- Bruce T. Lundin
- Smith J. DeFrance

=== 1966 ===
- Earl D. Hilburn
- John D. Young
- Oscar W. Schey
- John F. Clark
- Edgar M. Cortright
- Robert L. Krieger
- George J. Vecchietti
- Harold B. Finger
- Harry H. Gorman
- Edmund F. O'Connor
- Eberhard F. M. Rees
- Hermann K. Weidner
- Robert F. Thompson
- John J. Williams
- Maj. Gen. Vincent G. Huston (USAF)

=== 1970 ===
- James C. Elms
- Robert L. Krieger

=== 1972 ===
- Leonard Jaffe

=== 1973 ===
- Donald D. Arabian
- Eugene H. Cagle
- William C. Keathley
- Edwin C. Kilgore
- Eugene F. Kranz
- Robert O. Piland
- Stanley R. Reinartz
- Philip C. Shaffer

=== 1974 ===
- John R. Casani
- M. P. Frank
- Robert A. Parker

=== 1975 ===
- Arnold D. Aldrich
- Robert O. Aller
- John P. Donnelly
- Don M. Hartung
- Seymour C. Himmel
- Walter J. Kapryan
- Robert N. Lindley
- Bernard Lubarsky
- Leslie H. Meredith
- John J. Neilon
- William H. Rock
- Robert J. Shafer
- Charles H. Terhune

=== 1976 ===
- Robert C. Baumann
- Paul C. Donnelly
- Albert G. Ferris
- James J. Kramer
- Charles T. Newman
- Joseph E. Robbins
- Miles Ross
- Michael J. Vaccaro

=== 1977 ===
- Manuel Bautista Aranda
- Loren G. Bright
- G. Calvin Broome
- Edmund A. Brummer
- Robert L. Crabtree
- John E. Duberg
- E. Barton Geer
- George N. Gianopulos
- Wayne R. Glenny
- Angelo Guastaferro
- Jack E. Harris
- Marshall S. Johnson
- Louis Kingsland
- Robert A. Leslie
- Peter T. Lyman
- William J. O'Neil
- George F. Pieper
- Ronald A. Ploszaj
- James E. Stitt
- Israel Taback
- Allen E. Wolfe
- Howard T. Wright

=== 1978 ===
- Eugenio Covacevich
- George C. Deutsch
- James A. Downey
- Edmond J. Golden
- Robert E. King
- John A. Manke
- John P. Reeder
- Geoffrey Robillard
- Nancy G. Roman
- Donald K. Slayton
- Fridtjof A. H. Speer

=== 1981 ===
- John R. Casani
- Robert S. Kraemer

=== 1984 ===
- Dale L. Compton
- H. Robert Lynn
- Richard Sade
- Robert E. Spearing

=== 1992 ===
- Marshall E. Alper
- A. Thomas Young

=== 1994 ===
- Alphonso V. Diaz

=== 2000 ===
- Eileen M. Collins
- Kevin L. Petersen
- Eugene Tu

=== 2006 ===
- Joel S. Levine

=== 2007 ===
- Michael Gazarik
- Susan Gorton
- Ajay Kumar
- Laurence Leavitt
- Brenton Weathered

=== 2009 ===
- Christian L. Hardcastle

=== 2010 ===
- Kenneth M. Ford

=== 2011 ===
- Julie A. Robinson (biologist)

=== 2012 ===
- Christa Peters-Lidard
- Anne R. Douglass
- Jason P. Dworkin

=== 2014 ===
- Donald M. Cornwell

=== 2020 ===
- Jason R. Adam
- Kenneth L. Ashford Jr.
- Yvette Binford
- Robert W. Bobo
- Michael P. Bradford
- Donald G. Chavers
- Joseph C. Cianciola
- John P. Crisler
- Mike Gold
- Monica S. Hammond
- Roslin K. Hicks
- Randall C. Hopkins
- Richard T. Howard
- Gary L. Humphrey
- Ruth D. Jones
- Joe L. Leopard
- Jennifer B. McCaghren
- Joseph J. Pelfrey
- Lisa W. Smith
- David L. Thaxton

=== 2021 ===
- Wesley W. Deadrick
- Casey L. Swails

=== 2024 ===
- Nicholas G. Skytland
- Joel B. Walker

=== 2025 ===
- Justin C. Pane
- Zachary S. Roberts

== See also ==
- List of NASA awards
