= Walter C. Williams =

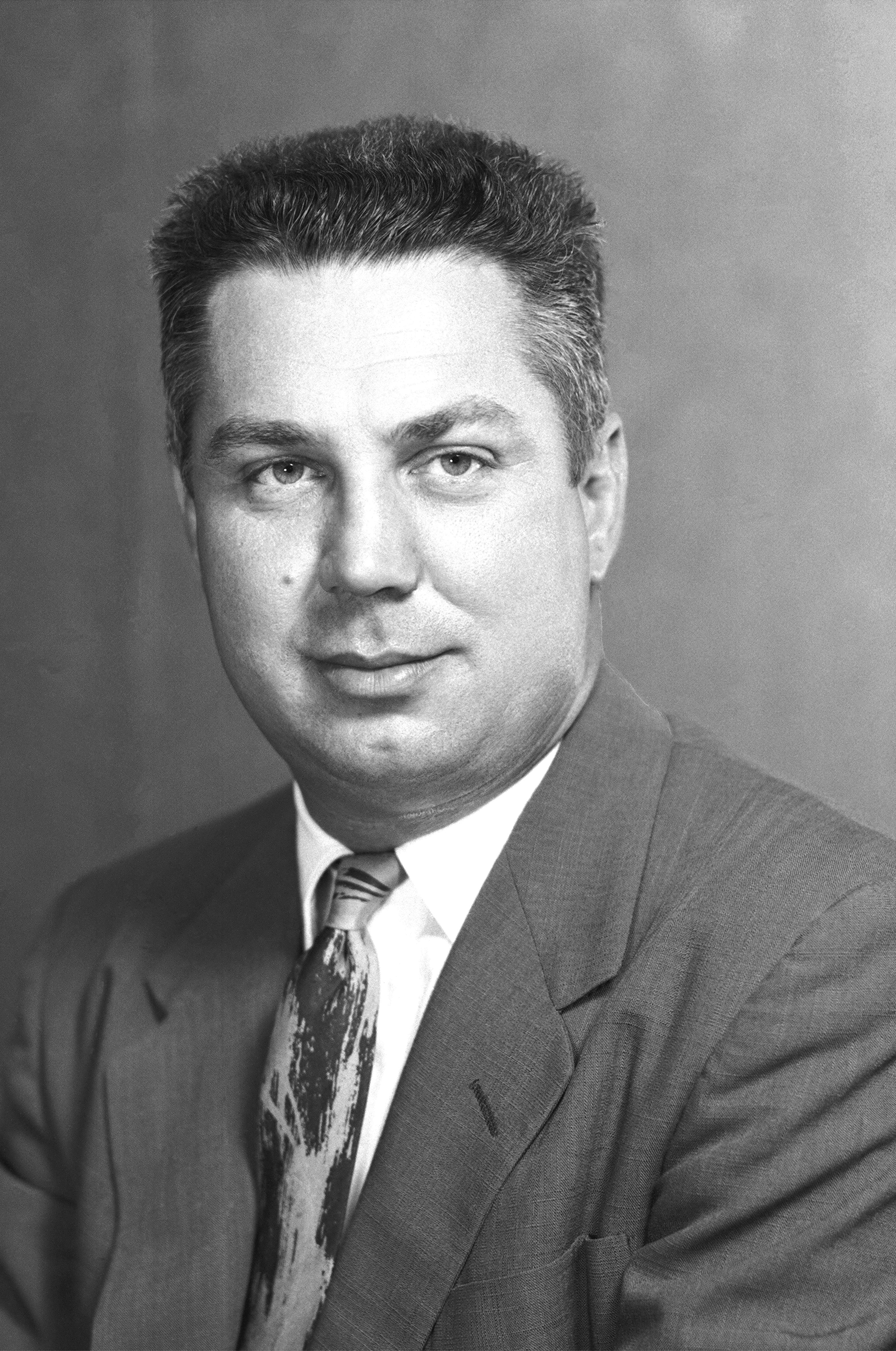
- 1954 portrait
- Born: Walter Charles Williams; July 30, 1919; New Orleans, Louisiana, U.S.
- Died: October 7, 1995 (aged 76); Tarzana, California, U.S.
- Other name: Walt Williams
- Education: Louisiana State University (BS)
- Occupation: Aerospace engineer
- Years active: 1939–1982
- Awards: NASA Distinguished Service Medal (1962, 1981); Sylvanus Albert Reed Award (1962); John J. Montgomery Award (1963); Haley Astronautics Award (1964); American Astronautical Society Space Flight Award (1978); Federal Engineer of the Year Award (1981)

Walter Charles Williams (July 30, 1919 – October 7, 1995) was an American engineer, leader of the National Advisory Committee for Aeronautics (NACA) group at Edwards Air Force Base in the 1940s and 1950s, and a NASA deputy associate administrator during Project Mercury.

== Biography ==
Walter Charles Williams was born in New Orleans, Louisiana, on July 30, 1919. He received a Bachelor of Science degree in aeronautical engineering from Louisiana State University (LSU) in 1939, and worked for Glenn L. Martin Company in Baltimore, Maryland. He joined the National Advisory Committee for Aeronautics (NACA), in August 1940. During World War II he served as a project engineer on projects to improve the performance and handling of fighter aircraft such as the Republic P-47 Thunderbolt, North American P-51 Mustang and Grumman F6F Hellcat.

In September 1946 Williams became the NACA project engineer on the Bell X-1, a rocket-propelled research aircraft. He assembled a team which moved from NACA's Langley Memorial Aeronautical Laboratory in Hampton, Virginia, to the Muroc Army Air Base in California's Mojave Desert. His detachment at Muroc became the Dryden Flight Research Center in 1976, and the Armstrong Flight Research Center in 2014. He was involved in the testing of the X-1, the aircraft in which United States Air Force (USAF) Captain Chuck Yeager carried out the first piloted supersonic flight at Muroc on October 14, 1947. His protégé, De E. Beeler, later became deputy and acting director of the center.

Williams went on to direct test programs for the new generation of jet aircraft, including Douglas D-558-2 Skyrocket, the first aircraft to fly at twice the speed of sound; the Bell X-5, which pioneered the variable-sweep wing; the Convair XF-92, which pioneered the delta wing, and the Century Series of supersonic aircraft which were the fruits of his research in supersonic flight. In January 1958, he became chairman of the Flight Test Steering Committee for the hypersonic North American X-15. He was the author of many NASA technical papers, including "The Comparison of Flight Measurement of High-Speed Airplane Stability and Control Characteristics", which he presented in Brussels in August 1956, and "The X-15 Research Airplane Program", which was presented at the American Rocket Society Space Exploration Regional Meeting in San Diego, California, in 1958.

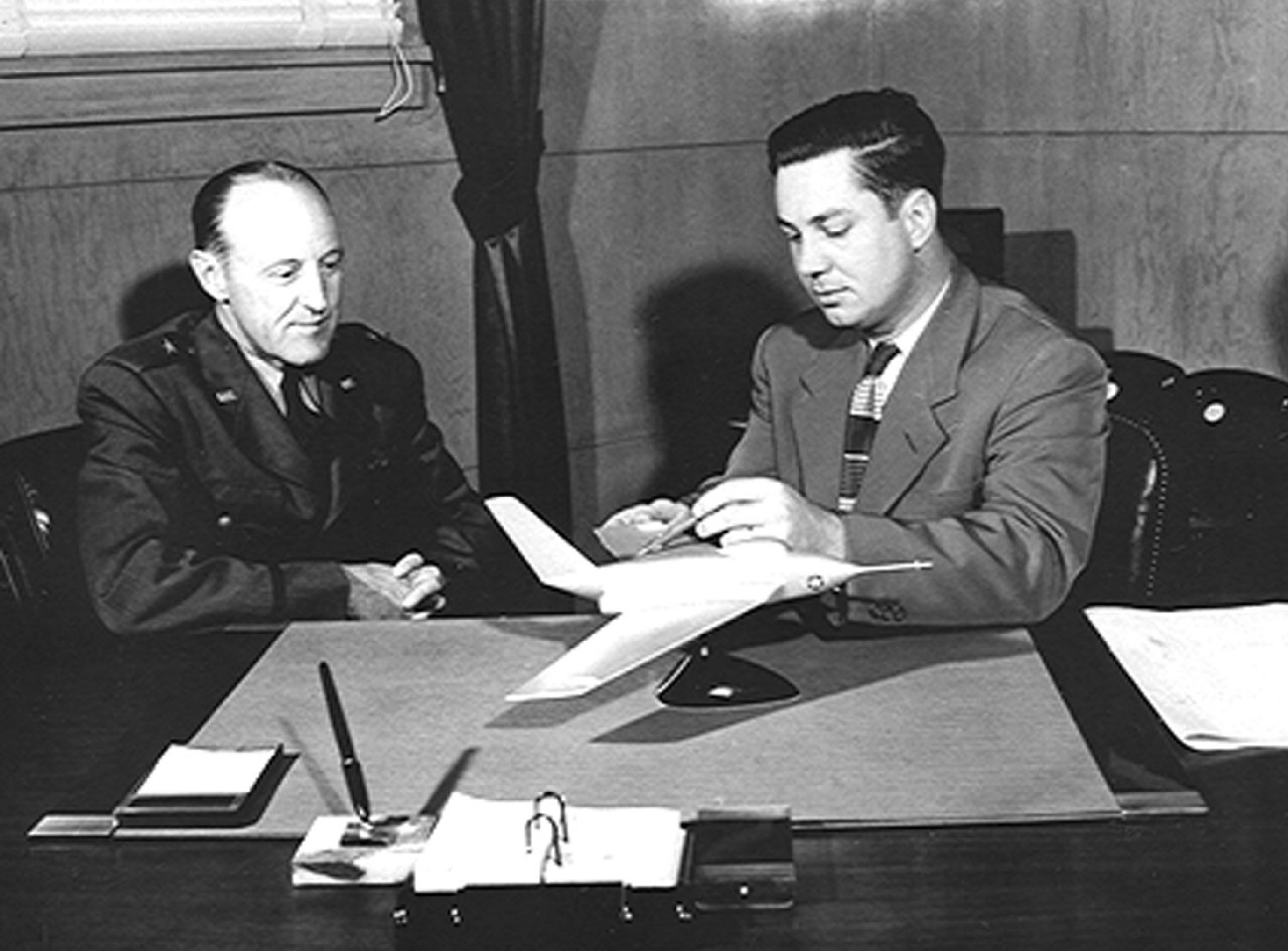
Williams with a model of the Northrop X-4 Bantam with Brigadier General Albert Boyd in 1950

Along with other NACA facilities, Williams' research station at Muroc was absorbed into the National Aeronautics and Space Administration (NASA) when it was formed on October 1, 1958. In September 1959, he returned to Langley, Virginia, as the Associate Director of the Space Task Group, which had been formed to carry out Project Mercury, the United States' first crewed space program. He became the project Director of Operations at Cape Canaveral, and as such supervised all the Project Mercury missions, including Alan Shepard's first American spaceflight, Mercury-Redstone 3 in 1961, and John Glenn's first American orbital flight, Mercury-Atlas 6 in 1962.

In 1963, Williams became deputy associate administrator in the Office of Manned Space Flight at NASA Headquarters. He left NASA in April 1964, and became vice president and general manager of the Vehicle Systems Division at The Aerospace Corporation, in which capacity he was responsible for systems engineering and technical direction of the Project Gemini Titan II launch and Atlas-Agena target vehicles, the Titan III launch vehicles, and the USAF Manned Orbiting Laboratory, along with Aerospace Corporation activities at both the Eastern and Western Test Ranges. He returned to NASA Headquarters as chief engineer in 1975, a position he held until he retired in July 1982.

Williams was twice a recipient of the NASA Distinguished Service Medal, and received the Sylvanus Albert Reed Award in 1962, the John J. Montgomery Award in 1963. Haley Astronautics Award in 1964, the American Astronautical Society Space Flight Award in 1978, and the Federal Engineer of the Year Award from the National Society of Professional Engineers in 1981. He was awarded an honorary Doctor of Engineering degree by LSU in 1963. In 1997 he was inducted into the International Space Hall of Fame.

Williams died at his home in Tarzana, California, on October 7, 1995. He was survived by his wife Helen Manning Williams; sons Charles M. Williams and Howard L. Williams; and daughter, Elizabeth Ann Powell. On November 17, 1995, Kenneth J. Szalai, the director of the Dryden Flight Research Center renamed the Integrated Test Facility (ITF) there the Walter C. Williams Research Aircraft Integration Facility in his honor.
