= Forrest S. Petersen =

American Naval Rear Admiral (1922–1990)

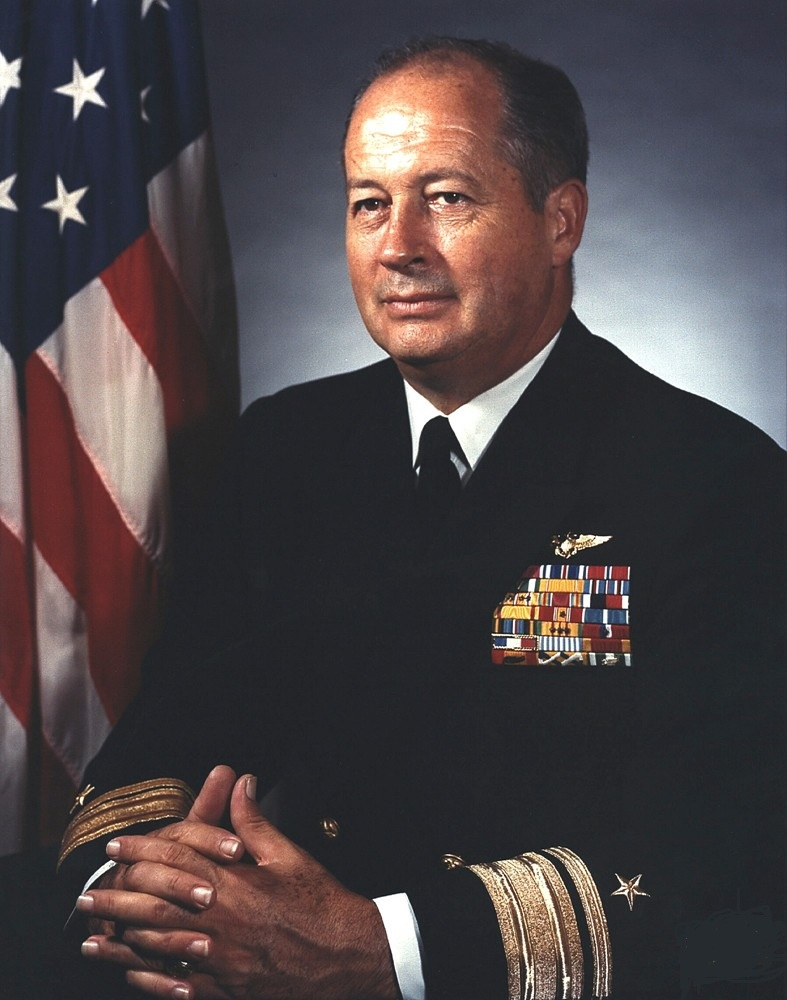
- Born: Forrest Silas Petersen; May 16, 1922; Holdrege, Nebraska, U.S.
- Died: December 8, 1990 (aged 68); Georgetown, South Carolina, U.S.
- Burial place: Arlington National Cemetery
- Education: USNA, B.S. 1944; NPS, B.S. 1950; Princeton University, M.S. 1951
- Military career
- Allegiance: United States
- Branch: United States Navy
- Service years: 1944–1980
- Rank: Vice admiral
- Commands: Naval Air Systems Command; USS Enterprise
- Conflicts: World War II; Korean War; Vietnam War
- Awards: Legion of Merit; Distinguished Flying Cross; Bronze Star

Forrest Silas Petersen (May 16, 1922 – December 8, 1990), (VADM, USN), was a United States Navy aviator and test pilot. He was one of twelve pilots who flew the North American X-15, an experimental spaceplane jointly operated by the Air Force and NASA.

== Birth and education ==
Born May 16, 1922, in Holdrege, Nebraska, he was the son of Elmer and Stella Petersen, and was raised in Gibbon, Nebraska. He graduated from Gibbon High School in 1939. Prior to his admission to the United States Naval Academy, he attended the University of Nebraska for two years.

== Military career ==
He graduated from the U.S. Naval Academy in 1944 with a Naval Science degree. He was commissioned as an ensign and reported to the destroyer USS Caperton. While serving aboard USS Caperton, he participated in campaigns in the Philippines, Formosa and Okinawa. After graduation from flight training in 1947, he was assigned to Fighting Squadron Twenty Able which was later redesignated Fighter Squadron 192.

Petersen graduated from the U.S. Naval Postgraduate School with a Bachelor of Science degree in Aeronautical Engineering in July 1950. He continued studies for one year at Princeton University and received a Master of Science degree in Engineering. From 1953 to 1956 he served with Fighter Squadron 51. In 1956, he was selected to attend the U.S. Naval Test Pilot School, and remained as an instructor following graduation.

In August 1958, he was assigned duties as Research Pilot in the X-15 Program and served at the Dryden Flight Research Center at Edwards Air Force Base, California until January 1962. During that time, he made five free flights in the X-15 and achieved a speed of 3,600 mph (5,800 km/h) (Mach 5.3) and an altitude of about 102,000 feet (31 km). He was one of the initial three test pilots, with Joe Walker, Bob White, and contractor pilot Scott Crossfield. He was the only active duty Navy pilot to fly the X-15 (John B. McKay, Milton O. Thompson, Scott Crossfield and Neil Armstrong were former Navy pilots). In July 1962, he was a joint recipient of the Collier Trophy, which was presented by President John F. Kennedy, and the NASA Distinguished Service Medal, which was presented by Vice President Lyndon B. Johnson.

Petersen served as Commanding Officer of Fighter Squadron 154 prior to being assigned to the office of Director, Division of Naval Reactors, Atomic Energy Commission for Nuclear Power Training. He reported to the aircraft carrier USS Enterprise in January 1964 and served as Executive Officer until April 1966. He was awarded the Bronze Star for duty during Enterprise's first combat tour in Vietnam. In November 1967, he assumed command of USS Bexar in the Pacific Fleet Amphibious Forces. Following an eight-month deployment with the United States Seventh Fleet Amphibious Forces in the Western Pacific, he was awarded the Navy Commendation Medal with Combat V. He then served as Commanding Officer of USS Enterprise (July 8, 1969 – December 3, 1971). He was then assigned duties as an Assistant to the Director of Naval Program Planning in the office of the Chief of Naval Operations. In 1974, he went on to command Combined Task Force 60 (CTF-60) based at Athens, Greece. In 1975 he came back to the Pentagon to head the Naval Air Operations office. He then headed the Naval Air Systems Command, from which he retired in 1980.

== Awards and decorations ==
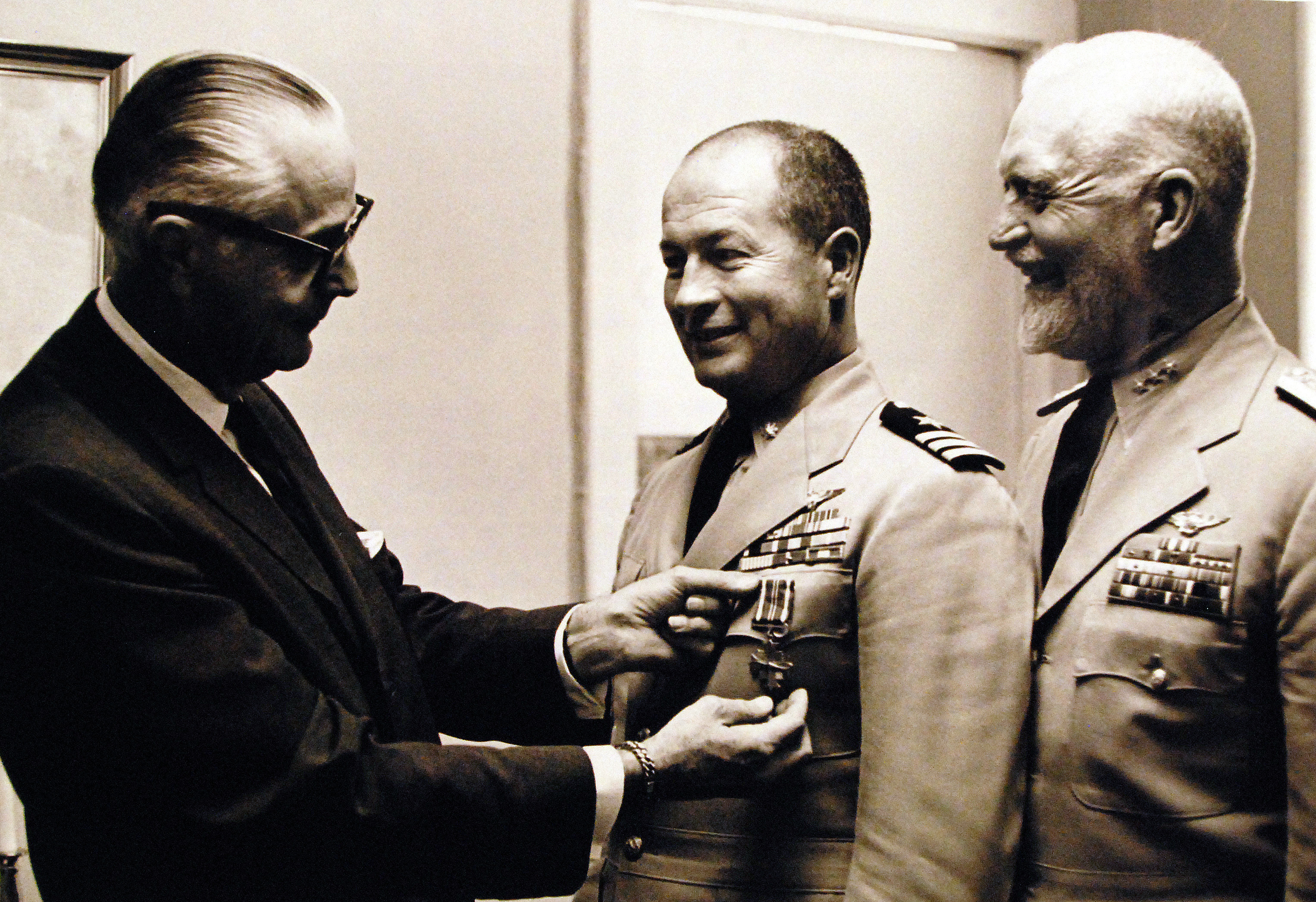
Petersen receives the Distinguished Flying Cross from Secretary of the Navy Fred Korth as Vice Admiral Robert B. Pirie looks on (July 1962)

Petersen held the following awards for service in World War II, Korean War and the Vietnam War: Legion of Merit, Distinguished Flying Cross, Bronze Star, Navy Commendation Medal (with "Combat V"), American Defense Service Medal, Asiatic-Pacific Campaign Medal, American Campaign Medal, China Service Medal, Army of Occupation Medal (with "Japan" clasp), Philippine Liberation Medal, Philippine Presidential Unit Citation, World War II Victory Medal, Korean Service Medal, United Nations Service Medal, Vietnam Service Medal, Vietnam Campaign Medal, National Defense Service Medal (with bronze service star), Korean War Service Medal, and the NASA Distinguished Service Medal. In 1962 he also received the John J. Montgomery Award. The midshipman library at the University of Nebraska–Lincoln is named in honor of Admiral Petersen.

== Family ==
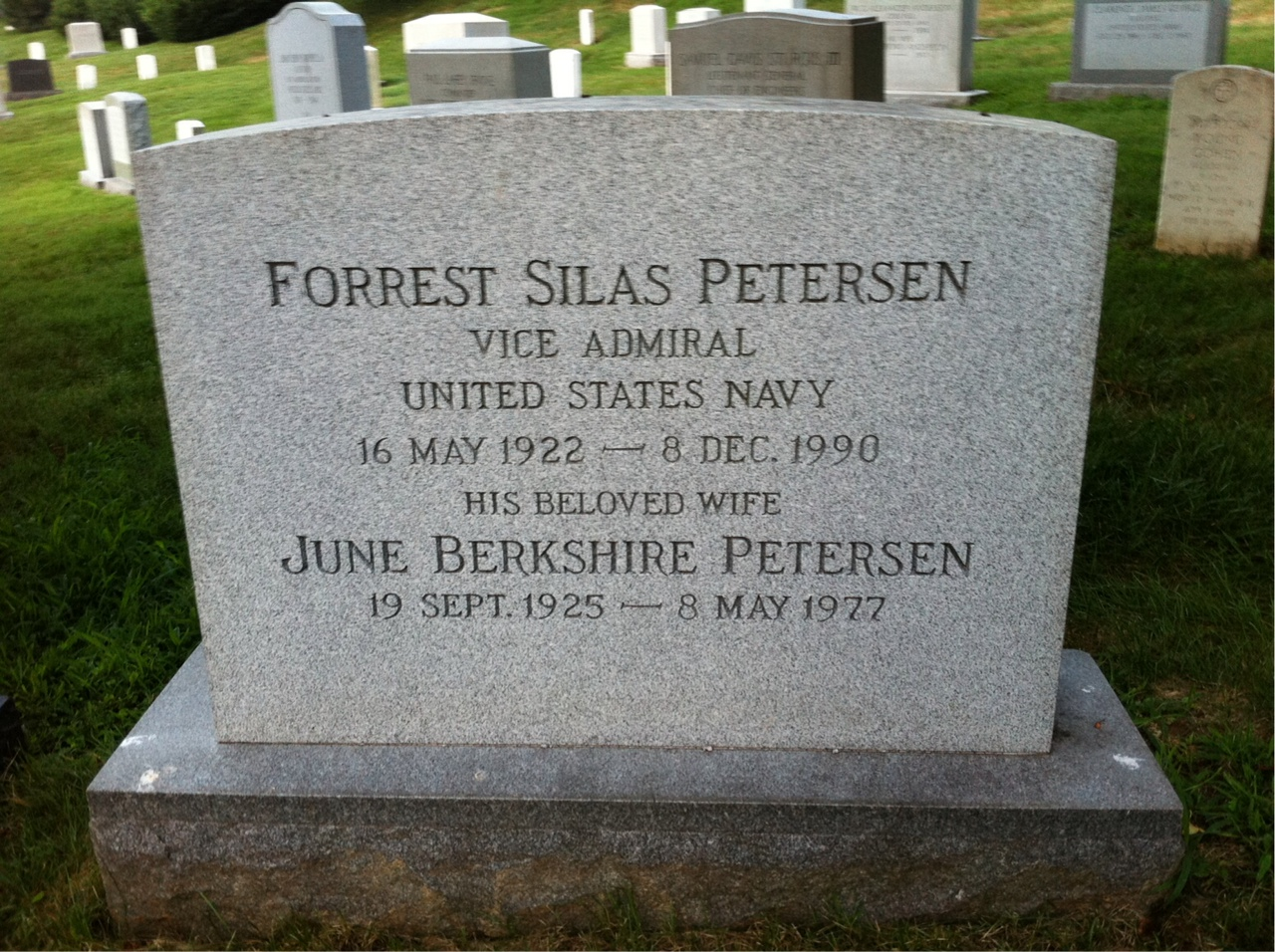
Grave at Arlington National Cemetery

Petersen married June Berkshire on February 2, 1946. They had three children: Lynn Elizabeth, Nels Christian, and Forrest Dean. June died on May 8, 1977. He subsequently married Jean Baldwin on June 17, 1978; she had a son, Preston. She died in 2005.

== Death and burial ==
He died on December 8, 1990, in Georgetown, South Carolina from a brain tumor, at age 68. He is buried at Arlington National Cemetery.
