= Christa Peters-Lidard =

American hydrologist

- Born: Christa Dianne Peters
- Education: Virginia Tech (BS); Princeton University (MA, PhD)
- Scientific career
- Thesis: The effect of land surface heterogeneity on land-atmosphere interactions (1997)
- Doctoral advisor: Eric F. Wood

Christa Peters-Lidard is an American hydrologist known for her work on integrating land surface modeling and data assimilation, particularly with remotely sensed measurements of precipitation.

== Early life ==
Peters-Lidard grew up in Chesterfield County, Virginia where she was fascinated about nature, learned that she was good at math, and that she liked earth science. As an undergraduate at Virginia Tech she worked on a project on aquifers and groundwater flow at the United States Geological Survey and at that point she realized that she wanted to be an earth scientist at National Aeronautics and Space Agency (NASA).

== Education and career ==
Peters-Lidard has a B.S. in Geophysics from Virginia Tech (1991). Subsequently she earned an M.A. (1993) and a Ph.D. (1997) in Civil Engineering and Operations Research in the Water Resources Program at Princeton University. From 1997 to 2001, Peters-Lidard was an assistant professor at Georgia Institute of Technology. Following this she joined the hydrological sciences branch of the National Aeronautics and Space Agency (NASA) at the Goddard Space Flight Center. In 2015, Peters-Lidard became the Deputy Director for Hydrosphere, Biosphere, and Geophysics in the Earth Sciences Division at NASA Goddard Space Flight Center. After serving as Director of the Sciences and Exploration Directorate from 2024 to 2026, She took early retirement from Goddard Space Flight Center, under the Deferred Resignation Program/Voluntary Early Retirement Authority. In 2026, she was appointed as a Distinguished Visiting Scientist at Schmidt Sciences.

From 2011 to 2018 Peters-Lidard was the Chief Editor for the Journal of Hydrometeorology.

== Research ==
Peters-Lidard's graduate work linked rainfall measurements with data from airborne sensors detecting rainfall. She also established a mathematical framework to link land-atmosphere models with remotely-sensed rainfall data, and considered the role of heat being released from soils on modeling energy fluxes. While at Georgia Institute of Technology, she used balloons to make measurements of boundary layers in the atmosphere. Peters-Lidard has had one Ph.D. student, Feifei Pan, who estimated the amount of water in soils based on rainfall levels, and examined algorithms used to characterize variability in a region's topography.

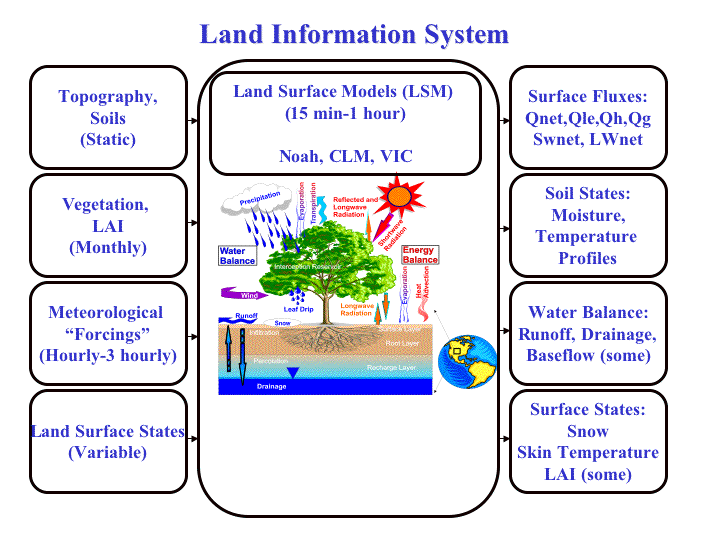
Peters-Lidard led the team that developed NASA's Land Information System (LIS) that co-won NASA's software of the year award in 2005.

Peters-Lidard led the team that built a high performance computing cluster that became NASA's Land Information System software (LIS). LIS was the co-winner of NASA's 2005 software of the year award. LIS allows land surface modeling and data assimilation and, working with Sujay Kumar, Peters-Lidard used this system to quantify soil moisture assimilation.

=== Selected publications ===
- Peters-Lidard, C. D.; Houser, P. R.; Tian, Y.; Kumar, S. V.; Geiger, J.; Olden, S.; Lighty, L.; Doty, B.; Dirmeyer, P.; Adams, J.; Mitchell, K. (2007-09-01). "High-performance Earth system modeling with NASA/GSFC's Land Information System". Innovations in Systems and Software Engineering. 3 (3): 157–165. doi:10.1007/s11334-007-0028-x. ISSN 1614-5054. S2CID 9478651.
- Peters-Lidard, C. D.; Blackburn, E.; Liang, X.; Wood, E. F. (1998-04-01). "The Effect of Soil Thermal Conductivity Parameterization on Surface Energy Fluxes and Temperatures". Journal of the Atmospheric Sciences. 55 (7): 1209–1224. Bibcode:1998JAtS...55.1209P. doi:10.1175/1520-0469(1998)055<1209:TEOSTC>2.0.CO;2. ISSN 0022-4928.
- Tian, Yudong; Peters-Lidard, Christa D. (2010). "A global map of uncertainties in satellite-based precipitation measurements". Geophysical Research Letters. 37 (24): n/a. Bibcode:2010GeoRL..3724407T. doi:10.1029/2010GL046008. ISSN 1944-8007. S2CID 129457699.
- Kumar, Sujay V.; Reichle, Rolf H.; Koster, Randal D.; Crow, Wade T.; Peters-Lidard, Christa D. (2009-12-01). "Role of Subsurface Physics in the Assimilation of Surface Soil Moisture Observations". Journal of Hydrometeorology. 10 (6): 1534–1547. Bibcode:2009JHyMe..10.1534K. doi:10.1175/2009JHM1134.1. ISSN 1525-7541. S2CID 53057308.

== Awards and honors ==
- Arthur S. Flemming Award (2007)
- NASA Outstanding Leadership Medal (2012)
- Fellow, American Meteorological Society (2012)
- Fellow, American Geophysical Union (2018)
- Member, National Academy of Engineering (2023)
- Fellow, American Association for the Advancement of Science (2025)
