= Chinese Institute of Engineers USA =

Engineering organization of the United States

Chinese Institute of Engineers USA (CIE / USA) is a non-profit, non-political organization serving the engineering community in the United States. CIE was founded in 1917 in New York.

== History ==
Recognizing the need for engineers to help modernize China in early 20th century, students were sent abroad to study science and engineering. In 1917, the Chinese Institute of Engineers was founded in the U.S. by a group of Chinese engineers, including Zhan Tianyou. These charter members were graduate students from American colleges and/or were receiving practical training in American railroads and industries.

The Chinese Institute of Engineers New York Chapter was re-activated as an independent entity in July 1953 in New York City by a number of accomplished engineers in the U.S. The CIE/USA National Council, a federation organization of CIE/USA, was established in 1986 with the Greater New York and San Francisco Bay Area Chapters as its founding chapters. In the following years, the National Council was expanded to include Seattle Chapter, OCEESA Chapter, Dallas–Fort Worth Chapter, New Mexico Chapter, and Southern California Chapter.

== Major events ==
Within the United States, at the national level, and in conjunction with DiscoverE, CIE-USA hosts the annual Asian American Engineer of the Year (AAEOY) Award. AAEOY serves as a platform to recognize outstanding Asian American professionals in the areas of STEM and leaderships, and they are nominated from the corporations, academics, government and national renowned institutions.

At the international level, CIE co-hosts the bi-annual Sino-American Technology and Engineering Conference (SATEC). This event was first held in 1993 and organized in collaboration with the Chinese State Council of People's Republic of China. The second co-hosted bi-annual event is the Modern Engineering and Technology Seminars (METS). Founded in 1966 between the CIE-NY and CIE-ROC chapters, this event is in collaboration with the Taiwan national government. Over the years, the METS has introduced many advanced technologies to Taiwan and set up the stage for the microelectronics developments in Taiwan.

== Chapters ==
Currently there are six regional chapters and one professional chapter in the US. They are as following:

- Dallas–Fort Worth (CIE-DFW)
- Greater New York (CIE-GNY)
- New Mexico (CIE-NM)
- Oversea Chinese Environmental Engineers and Scientists Association (OCEESA)
- San Francisco Bay Area (CIE-SFB)
- Seattle (CIE-SEA)
- Southern California (CIE-SOCAL)
