= Semmel (surname) =

Semmel is surname of:

- Bernard Semmel (1928–2008), American historian specialising in British imperial history
- Clarrie Semmel (1910–2000), Australian rules footballer
- Joan Semmel (born 1932), American feminist painter and professor emeritus in painting
- K.E. Semmel, American author, literary translator, and disability advocate
- Paul Semmel (born 1939), American politician from Pennsylvania
- Ralph Semmel, American engineer and computer scientist
- Richard Semmel (1875–1950), German entrepreneur and art collector

== See also ==
- Semmel or Kaiser roll, bread roll from Vienna
- Semel (disambiguation)
