= Curtis Stewart =

Curtis Stewart may refer to:

- Curtis Stewart (American football)
- Curtis Stewart (violinist)
- Kidd Kidd, real name Curtis Stewart, American rapper
