= Denevi =

Denevi is an Italian surname. Notable people with the surname include:

- Brett Denevi (born 1980), American geologist
- Marco Denevi (1922–1998), Argentine writer
