= Robert Lai =

Taiwanese-American professor, naval engineer, and political activist

Robert Yih-shyong Lai
- 賴義雄博士
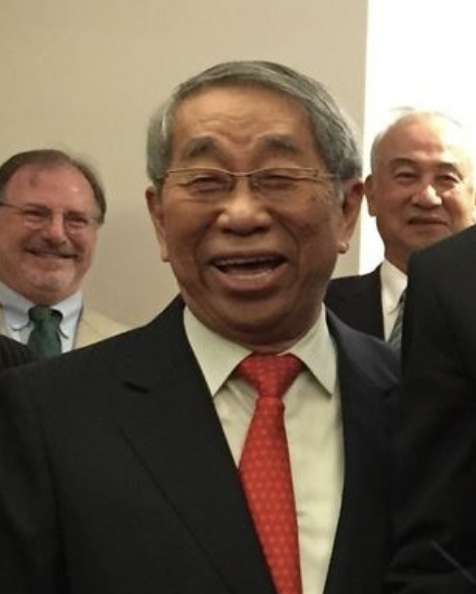
- Robert Lai pictured when chairman of GTI
- Born: July 24, 1940; Keelung, Taiwan
- Died: April 30, 2018 (aged 77); Silver Spring, Maryland, U.S.
- Other name: Hsiao Lai
- Education: National Taiwan University (BS); Northwestern University (MS, PhD)
- Known for: Ballistic missile and nuclear submarine research
- Scientific career
- Fields: Civil engineering, fluid mechanics
- Workplaces: Global Taiwan Institute; NARL; TRW Inc. Johns Hopkins University; University of Wisconsin–Milwaukee
- Thesis: The Stokes-flow drag on prolate and oblate spheroids during axial translators accelerations
- Doctoral advisor: Lyle F. Mockros

Robert Yih-shyong Lai (July 24, 1940 – April 30, 2018) was a Taiwanese-American engineer who specialized in fluid mechanics.

After completing his post-doctoral work at SUNY Buffalo in 1969, Lai began his decade long teaching career at the University of Wisconsin–Milwaukee in 1970. In 1975, Lai became involved in the formation of the North American Taiwanese Professors Association (NATPA)—later becoming vice president and managing publications and editing—and by 1980 he had left his teaching post at the University of Wisconsin to pursue a career at Johns Hopkins Applied Physics Laboratory (APL). While continuing his work at NATPA, Lai took on the role as senior engineer at TRW Inc.

Lai would later return to Taiwan with his naval engineering expertise, becoming senior advisor to the National Defense Industry Association in 2005 and chairman of the National Applied Research Laboratories (NARL) in 2006.

Lai would eventually return to Washington, D.C. as the chairman of the Global Taiwan Institute (GTI) from 2016 until his death in 2018.

== Early life ==
Lai grew up in the port city of Keelung, Taiwan. Studying at Renaguo Elementary School followed by the affiliated middle school and high school. An outstanding student, Lai was sent to the Department of Civil Engineering at National Taiwan University (NTU). After graduation, Lai fulfilled his mandatory service in the army and worked as a teaching assistant at NTU for a year and a half.

== Education ==
In March 1965, Lai began attending Northwestern University. He built off of his civil engineering studies at NTU, majoring in water conservation and fluid mechanics and earning a master of science at Northwestern. He would continue on to achieve a doctorate of philosophy from Northwestern University in 1969 under doctoral advisor Lyle F. Mockros, only two years after achieving his MS in 1967. Lai then fulfilled his postdoctorate work at SUNY Buffalo in New York.

== Academic career ==
=== Career in the United States ===
Lai taught at the University of Wisconsin–Milwaukee from 1970 until 1980, before leaving to work at the Johns Hopkins Applied Physics Laboratory until 1982, where he specialized in ballistic missile submarine research. After leaving APL, Lai began a career at TRW, where he specialized in naval warfare development. His role at TRW lasted for almost two decades, before his retirement in 2000.

=== Career in Taiwan ===
In 2003, the National Science and Technology Association of Taiwan had fallen under the jurisdiction of NARL and Lai was named as the director for a three-year term. His role at NARL primarily involved negotiating with legislators and communicating for research grants. At NARL in 2006, Lai also began the TV program Scientific Taiwan (科技台灣).

Leaving his position in 2007 after the conclusion of his first three-year term, Lai was invited by President Wu Jianguo of Datong University to become an adjunct professor.

=== Return to the United States ===
In 2016, Lai would eventually return the United States, where he worked at GTI until 2018.

== Political involvement ==
In 1986, Lai met with then secretary-general of the Kuomintang Ma Shuli (having previously been blacklisted from Taiwan, due to being a pro-democracy political dissident). His conversation with Shuli encouraged the loosening of government-sanctioned political restrictions and the subsequent formation of the Democratic Progressive Party, an opposition political party.

Lai was involved in Taiwanese politics, notably in 2004 for helping to orchestrate the 228 Hand-in-Hand rally in opposition of the People's Republic of China's deployment of coastal missiles targeted at Taiwan, to commemorate the 228 Incident, and to call for peace across the Taiwan Strait.
