= Carlos Del Castillo =

Puerto Rican scientist

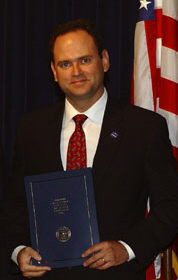
- Carlos Del Castillo with his Presidential award
- Born: c. 1965; San Juan, Puerto Rico
- Occupation: Scientist

Carlos Del Castillo (born c. 1965) is a scientist who, in 2004, became the recipient of the Presidential Early Career Award for Scientists and Engineers (PECASE) award, the highest honor bestowed by the United States government on scientists and engineers beginning their independent careers. Del Castillo was the Program Scientist for the Ocean Biology and Biogeochemistry Program at NASA Headquarters, in Washington, D.C. He is currently the Chief of the Ocean Ecology Laboratory at NASA Goddard Space Flight Center. Previously, among other things, he was a member of the Senior Professional Staff and Section Supervisor with the Space Department of the Johns Hopkins University Applied Physics Laboratory.

== Early years ==
Del Castillo was born in San Juan, the capital city of Puerto Rico, and raised in Mayaguez. There he received his primary and secondary education. He lived a humble life and spent most of his youth on or near the Atlantic Ocean. His upbringing near the ocean served as an influential factor when he decided to study biology at the University of Puerto Rico at Mayagüez where in 1987, he earned his Bachelor of Science degree in Biology.

He continued to work on a master's degree in Marine Science in the same institution. Del Castillo began studying the effects of oil pollution in the tropical marine environments. His master's thesis dealt with oil pollution and the results of his thesis was presented in a meeting in Rennes, France.

During this time period, he also served in the Puerto Rico National Guard and was assigned to the 240th Military Police Company. His military service included deployment to Saudi Arabia during the Gulf War. Del Castillo returned from the war in mid-1991 following the end of hostilities and was honorably discharged as a veteran of the conflict.

Upon his return to Puerto Rico Del Castillo earned his master's degree in Marine Science in 1991. He realized that there was a lack of funding for oil pollution research in Puerto Rico and therefore, he decided to continue his education and research at the University of South Florida. While pursuing his doctorates degree, he became interested in Organic Carbon biogeochemistry. He used remote sensing to study biogeochemical and physical processes in the oceans through a combination of remote sensing and field and laboratory experiments. Del Castillo was offered a position in a laboratory where he was to conduct a series of studies in the Arabian Sea similar to the ones which he had proposed to NASA. In his proposal to NASA, he asked the agency to conduct and study the optical properties of organic matter in the Orinoco River plume. It was his belief that Orinoco River plume was a critical aspect in the use of optical sensors for ocean Biogeochemical research. Del Castillo earned his PhD in Oceanography in 1998, from the University of South Florida and was awarded the William Sackett Prize for Innovation and Excellence in Research.

== Career in NASA ==
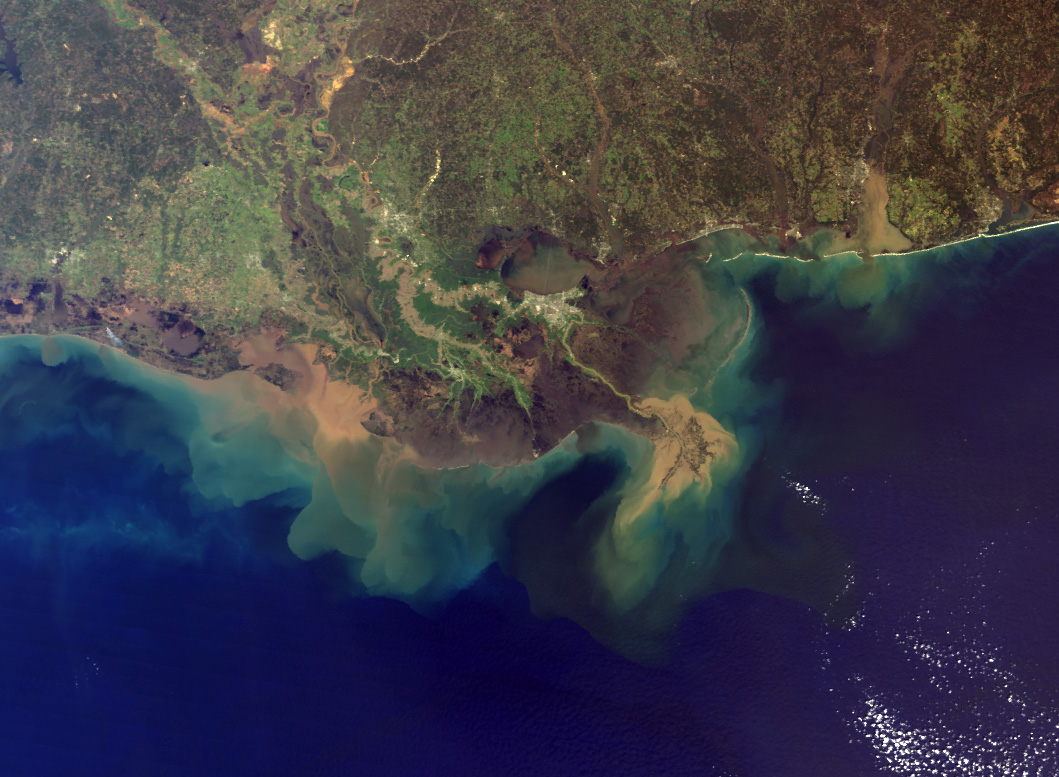
The Mississippi River Delta, showing the sediment plumes from the Mississippi and Atchafalaya Rivers, 2001.

Del Castillo was offered a position at NASA's Stennis Space Center (SSC), in Mississippi. There he worked as a researcher under the direction of Dr. Rick Miller, who led the Earth Systems Science Office. He began working in the Mississippi River plume and in the application of remote sensors to study coastal environments. He co-edited with Dr's. Richard Miller and Brent McKee, "Remote Sensing of the Coastal Environment," a book which provides extensive insight on remote sensing of coastal waters from aircraft and space-based platforms.

In 2003, Del Castillo was offered a position as Program Scientist for the Ocean Biology and Biogeochemistry program at NASA Headquarters in Washington, D.C. The temporary position allowed him to learn about policy, and interact with colleagues in academia and other branches of the government.

On September 9, 2003, National Science and Technology Council (NSTC) announced that Del Castillo would be awarded the prestigious Presidential Early Career Award for Scientists and Engineers (PECASE) for his research in Ocean Biology. The award, which is bestowed by the NSTC once during an individual's career, was officially given to Del Castillo in May 2004. It is the highest honor bestowed by the U.S. government on scientists and engineers beginning their independent careers.

Del Castillo is a member of NASA's Carbon Cycle and Ecosystem Management and Operations working group. In 2007, he was awarded the Emerald Honor Trailblazers Award. Del Castillo is a member of the Senior Professional Staff with the Department of Earth and Planetary Sciences of the Johns Hopkins Applied Physics Laboratory, and the William S. Parsons Professor at the Johns Hopkins University Department of Earth and Planetary Sciences. He has served as a member of the National Research Council Committee on Assessment of Impediments to Interagency Cooperation on Space and Earth Science Missions and the Committee on Assessing Requirements for Sustained Ocean Color Research and Operations.

== Awards and recognitions ==
- William Sackett Prize (1998)
- Presidential Early Career Award for Scientists and Engineers (PECASE) (2004)
- Emerald Honor Trailblazers Award (2007)
- Inducted to the Puerto Rico Veterans Hall of Fame (2017).

== Written work ==
Remote Sensing of Coastal Aquatic Environments: Technologies, Techniques and Applications (Remote Sensing and Digital Image Processing); authors: Carlos E. Del Castillo, Richard L. Miller; Brent A. McKee; Publisher: Springer (December 1, 2010); ISBN 9048167922; ISBN 978-9048167920.

== See also ==
- List of Puerto Ricans
- Puerto Rican scientists and inventors
- List of Puerto Ricans in the United States Space Program
- University of Puerto Rico at Mayaguez people
