= William H. Avery (engineer) =

Aeronautical engineer

William Hinckley Avery
- Born: July 25, 1912
- Died: June 26, 2004 (aged 91); West Yarmouth, Massachusetts, US
- Education: Harvard University
- Known for: Ocean Thermal Energy Conversion; ramjet
- Scientific career
- Workplaces: Applied Physics Laboratory; Allegany Ballistics Laboratory
- Thesis: I. Viscosity in relation to photo-chemical reaction. II. Certain photo-chemical reactions of hydrogen sulfide. (1937)
- Doctoral advisor: George Shannon Forbes

William Hinckley Avery (July 25, 1912 – June 26, 2004) was an influential aeronautical engineer. He designed the propulsion mechanism known as the ramjet, and was known for heading the Ocean Thermal Energy Conversion program which generates electricity from the temperature differential between shallow and deep ocean water.

== Early years ==
Avery was born on July 25, 1912. After studying chemistry and physics at Harvard and working as a private research chemist, Avery turned to rocket science during World War II. He directed a division of the Allegany Ballistics Laboratory in Cumberland, Maryland, that developed solid fuels for rockets later used to launch guided missiles and spacecraft.

== Ramjets ==
Avery moved to Johns Hopkins University in 1947 and soon became head of propulsion research at the Applied Physics Laboratory. Over the next several decades, his research laid the foundation for understanding combustion in rocket and jet engines. His group invented the propulsion system for Talos, the first surface-to-air missile to use a ramjet engine.

While at the Applied Physics Laboratory, Avery mentored Frederick S. Billig, the scramjet pioneer.

== Ocean Thermal Energy Conversion ==
In 1973, Avery began leading the Applied Physics Laboratory's work on emerging technologies. Searching for alternative sources of energy, he helped develop the Ocean Thermal Energy Conversion program, which used the temperature difference between shallow and deep tropical seawater to generate electricity. Avery retired from the Applied Physics Laboratory in 1989.

== Death ==
Avery died on June 26, 2004, of congestive heart failure.
