= Richard S. Potember =

American scientist and inventor

Richard Stanley Potember
- Born: Boston, Massachusetts
- Education: Merrimack College (BS) Johns Hopkins University (MA, MS, Ph.D.)
- Occupations: Scientist and Inventor

Richard S. Potember is an American scientist and inventor. He is currently a principal systems engineer at MITRE. Prior to this he was a program manager in the Tactical Technology Office at the Defense Advanced Research Projects Agency (DARPA). He has been an instructor at the Whiting School of Engineering at the Johns Hopkins University since 1987. He was a member of the principal professional staff at the Johns Hopkins Applied Physics Laboratory, Laurel, Maryland, from 1981 to 2015. He was an adjunct professor at The Paul H. Nitze School of Advanced International Studies from 1995 to 1998.

== Education ==
Potember was born in Boston, Massachusetts. He completed his B.S. in chemistry from Merrimack College in 1975 and his Ph.D. from Johns Hopkins University in chemistry in 1979, where his adviser was Dwaine O. Cowan. He completed his postdoctoral fellowship at the Johns Hopkins Applied Physics Laboratory (APL) in 1980. He received an M.S. in technical management from the Whiting School of Engineering, Johns Hopkins University in 1986.

== Research ==
Potember was first known for his groundbreaking work in molecular electronics. He invented the first two-terminal molecular non-volatile memory or memristor as well as an optical disc technology that can store multiple bits of information at one location. He also co-invented a sol-gel processed switchable vanadium(IV) oxide thin film coating for energy conservation applications.

Potember's recent achievements have focused on biotechnology and biomedical engineering. He performed pioneering work that demonstrated individual living nerve cells can be grown into controlled geometric patterns on substrates and these neurons can form true synaptic connections. that can be used to destroy viruses, bacteria and spores real-time in ventilated air, and in heating or air conditioning systems.

Potember has also conducted research and development in the areas of time-of-flight mass spectrometry and solid propellants.

== Personal life ==
Potember has two sons and lives with his wife in Maryland.
