= Johns Hopkins University Applied Physics Laboratory =

University-affiliated research center

Coordinates: 39°09′55″N 76°53′50″W

The Johns Hopkins University Applied Physics Laboratory LLC
- Motto: Critical Contributions to Critical Challenges
- Established: 1942
- Research type: Unclassified / classified
- Budget: $2.09 billion
- Director: Dave Van Wie
- Staff: 8,800
- Location: North Laurel, Maryland, U.S.
- Operating agency: Johns Hopkins University
- Website: www.jhuapl.edu

The Johns Hopkins University Applied Physics Laboratory LLC (abbreviated as Applied Physics Laboratory or APL) is a not-for-profit, United States Navy-sponsored, University-Affiliated Research Center (UARC) in Howard County, Maryland, United States.

APL is affiliated with Johns Hopkins University and employs more than 8,800 people as of 2025. APL conducts research, engineering and analysis to address national security and scientific challenges faced by the United States and its allies. The laboratory brings together technical expertise, longstanding experience and specialized facilities to support rapid prototyping and long-term research and development. APL works across a range of domains, contributing to both operational systems and foundational science and technology.

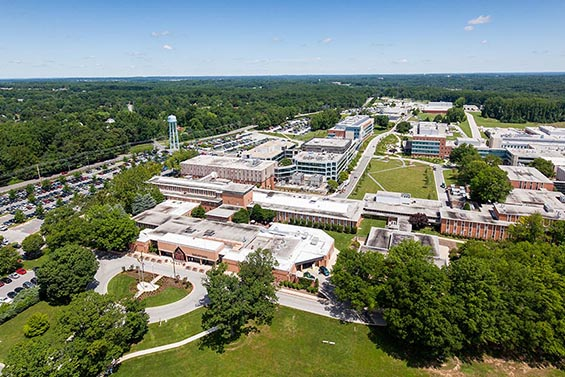
Aerial view of the main Johns Hopkins APL campus in Laurel, Maryland.

The laboratory serves as a technical resource for every branch of the Department of Defense, the Intelligence Community, the Department of Homeland Security, NASA, and other government agencies, along with industry. APL's organizational structure breaks down into four sectors (all sponsored by US government agencies), two technical departments, and five enterprise service departments. APL has also developed numerous systems and technologies in the areas of air and missile defense, surface and undersea naval warfare, computer security, and space science and spacecraft construction. The laboratory's work spans 13 mission areas, including applications from undersea systems and cyber operations to biological sciences and space exploration. Multidisciplinary teams integrate domain expertise and systems engineering to support a range of government missions.

== History ==
APL was established in 1942 during World War II under the Office of Scientific Research and Development's Section T as part of the government's effort to mobilize the nation's science and engineering expertise within its universities. Its founding director was Merle Anthony Tuve, who led Section T throughout the war.

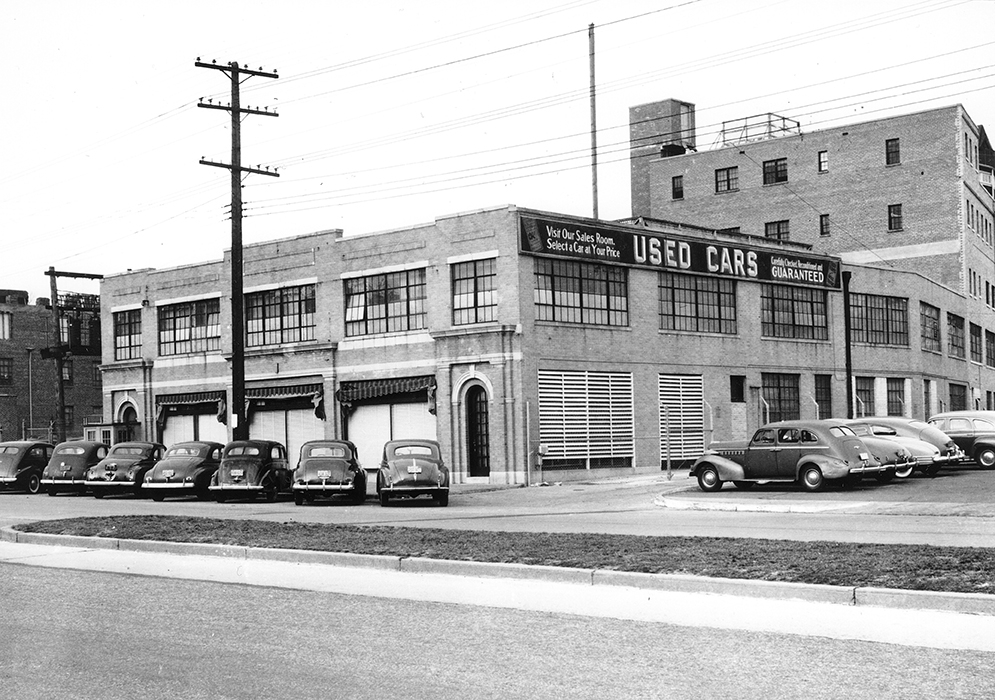
The original APL facility on Georgia Avenue in Silver Spring, Maryland, where the Laboratory opened during World War II and operated in the early Cold War era.

Section T was created on Aug. 17, 1940. According to the official history of the Office of Scientific Research and Development, Scientists Against Time, APL was the name of Section T's main laboratory from 1942 onward, not the name of the organization overall. Section T's Applied Physics Laboratory succeeded in developing the variable-time proximity fuze, which played a significant role in the Allied victory. In response to the fuze's success, APL created the MK 57 gun in 1944.

Pleased with APL's work, the Navy tasked the Laboratory with the mission to find a way to negate guided missile threats. From then on, APL became heavily involved in air and missile defense research. Expected to disband at the end of the war, APL instead became deeply engaged in the development of guided missile technology for the Navy. At the government’s request, the University continued to maintain the Laboratory as a public service.

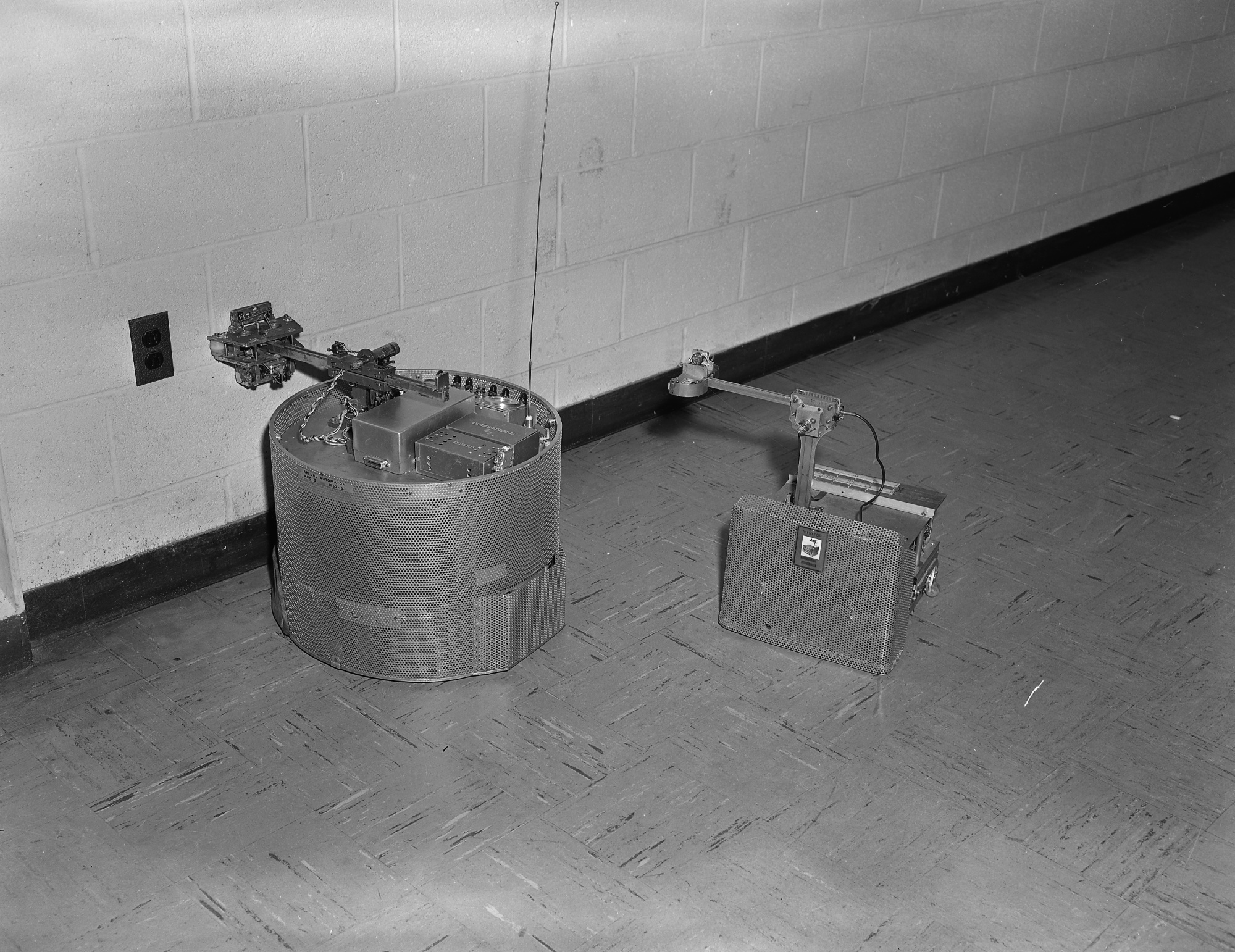
In the 1960s, APL developed an early autonomous robot known as “The Beast.” Built as an experiment in cybernetic behavior, the robot could recharge itself, avoid obstacles and detect light sources, marking a milestone in mobile robotics research.

APL was originally located in Silver Spring, Maryland in a used-car garage at the Wolfe Building at 8621 Georgia Avenue. APL began moving to Laurel in 1954 with the construction of a $2 million building and a $700,000 wing expansion in 1956. The final staff transitioned to the new facility in 1975. Before moving to Laurel, APL also maintained the “Forest Grove Station,” north of Silver Spring on Georgia Avenue near today's Forest Glen Metro, which included a hypersonic wind tunnel. The Forest Grove Station was vacated and torn down in 1963, and flight simulations were moved to Laurel. In the 1960s, APL built two early and pioneering autonomous robots, or “mobile automatons,” called Ferdinand and the Johns Hopkins Beast.

The Laboratory's name comes from its origins in World War II, but APL's major strengths are systems engineering and prototyping solutions to complex national security and scientific challenges with technical expertise, research and development, and analysis. More than 80% the staff are technical professionals, including nearly 1,500 Ph.Ds., and a majority of staff have degrees in engineering, math, computer science, physics, biology or similar fields.

APL conducts programs in fundamental and applied research; exploratory and advanced development; test and evaluation; and systems engineering and integration. In addition to its sponsored work, APL maintains an internal research and development program that provides seed funding for exploration of ideas and concepts to address the nation’s future challenges.

== Wartime Contributions ==
During the 1950s and ‘60s, APL worked with the Navy on the Operation Bumblebee Program, which produced the RIM-2 Terrier, RIM-8 Talos, and RIM-24 Tartar surface-to-air missile systems. The follow-on Typhon missile project, based on improved Talos and Tartar missiles, was successful but was cancelled in 1963 because of high costs. It was eventually developed into the Standard Missile and the now well-known Aegis combat system, based on an improved Terrier.

APL led the development of the transformational system needed to demonstrate ballistic missile defense (BMD) from the sea. The resulting experiments proved that BMD technology could be integrated with a Navy weapon system to “hit a bullet with a bullet” in space from sea.

In 1990, APL contributed to Operation Desert Storm, including work in the Gulf Crisis Room and other efforts.

== Notable Contributions ==
- Transit Navigation System (1960s): Developed the world’s first satellite-based navigation system, laying the groundwork for today’s GPS.
- Pershing (1965): Developed and implemented a test and evaluation program for the Pershing missile systems for the U.S. Army. APL developed the Pershing Operational Test Program (OTP), provided technical support to the Pershing Operational Test Unit (POTU), identified problem areas and improved the performance and survivability of the Pershing systems.
- AMFAR (1970s): Created the Adaptive Modular Phased Array Radar, contributing foundational technology for modern phased-array radar systems.
- Exploiting Undersea Physics (1970s–1980s): Advanced sonar array capabilities that enabled long-range detection of threat submarines and informed stealth design for the Navy.
- SATRACK (1980s): Revolutionized ballistic missile testing by enabling high-precision tracking of missile trajectories using onboard instrumentation.
- Tomahawk (1980s): Developed guidance algorithms enabling autonomous navigation and precision targeting, making Tomahawk the world’s first long-range, precision-guided cruise missile.
- Cooperative Engagement Capability (1990s): Enabled networked air defense by allowing distributed sensors and weapons systems to operate as a unified force.
- Discovery Program Missions (1990s–2000s): Led pioneering low-cost planetary missions, including NEAR and MESSENGER, expanding NASA’s deep space exploration.
- Ballistic Missile Defense from the Sea (2000s): Developed sea-based missile defense capabilities, enabling naval platforms to detect, track and intercept ballistic missiles around the world.
- Double Asteroid Redirection Test (2022): Led the first planetary defense test mission to deliberately alter the orbit of an asteroid through kinetic impact.

== Campus ==
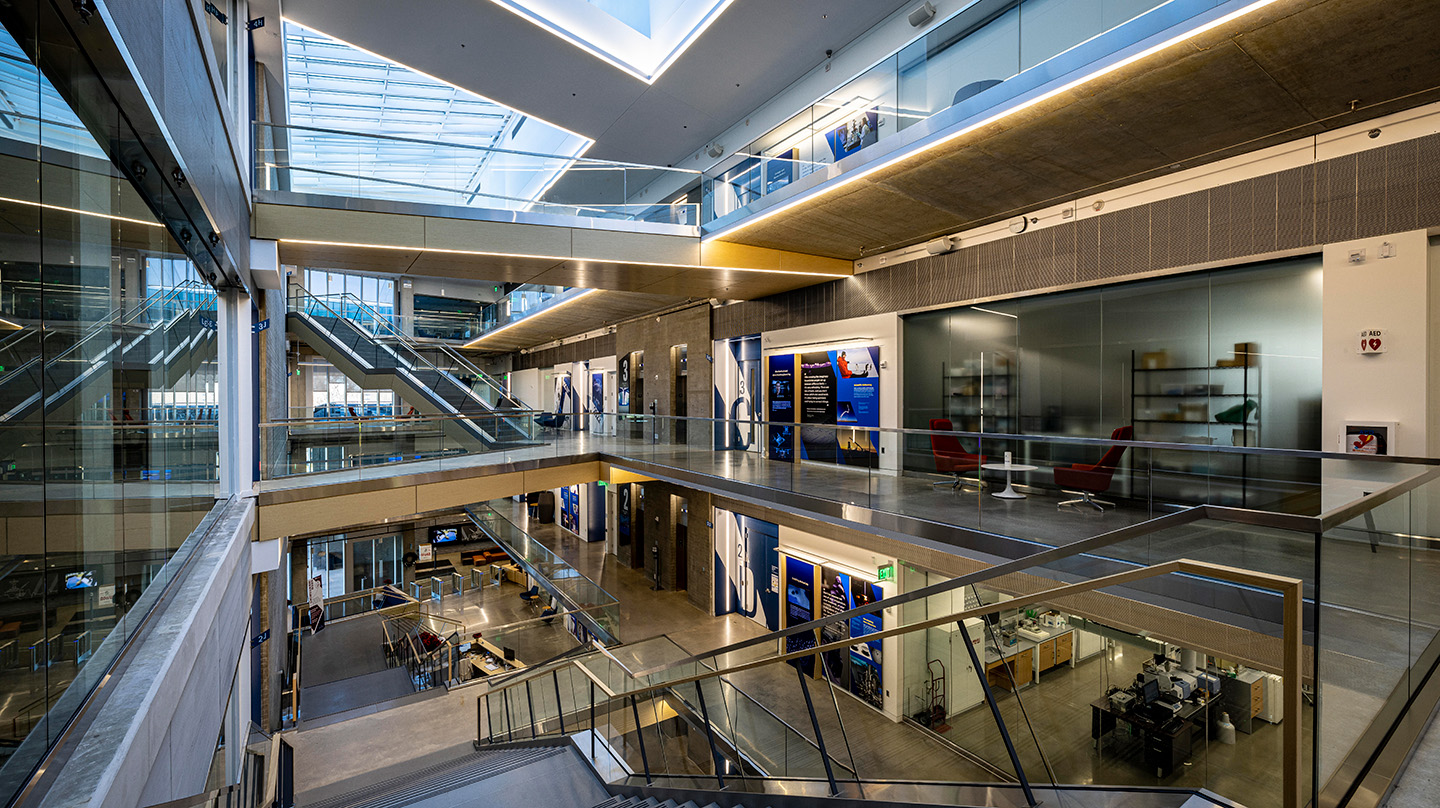
In 2021, APL opened an interdisciplinary research center, Building 201, with 263,000 square feet of space, a 200-person auditorium and more than 90,000 square feet of specialized laboratory space. In 2025, the building was renamed the Ralph D. Semmel Center for Innovation in honor of the Lab's eighth director, Ralph Semmel.

The modern Applied Physics Laboratory is located in Laurel, Maryland, and spans 461 acres with more than 30 buildings on site. Additional auxiliary campuses exist in the surrounding areas. The campus includes multiple innovation and collaboration spaces, as well as test facilities and more than 800 labs. APL also operates field offices across the nation that are closely aligned with the Department of Defense and other sponsor facilities.

In 2021, APL opened an interdisciplinary research center, Building 201, with 263,000 square feet of space, a 200-person auditorium and more than 90,000 square feet of specialized laboratory space. The building also includes a four-story atrium, a STEM center and 100 huddle conference and auditorium breakout rooms. In 2025, the building was renamed the Ralph D. Semmel Center for Innovation in honor of APL’s eighth director, Ralph Semmel, who led the Laboratory from 2010 to 2025.

== Education and internships ==
APL is also home to a Johns Hopkins Whiting School of Engineering (WSE) part-time graduate program in engineering and applied sciences for APL staff members and the public, called Engineering for Professionals (EP).

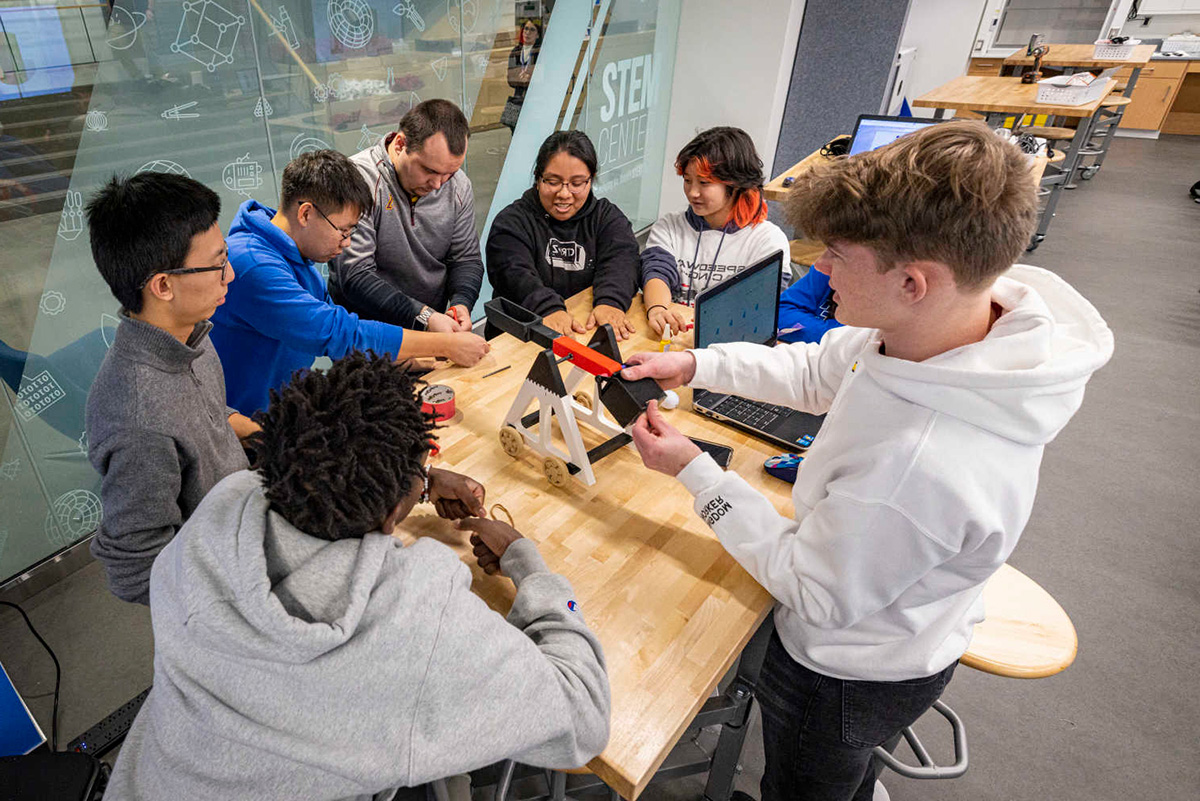
Students participating in APL’s STEM Academy program, which offers hands-on science and engineering education for middle and high school students.

Up to 75% of EP students now come from outside APL. The faculty includes scientists and engineers from APL and WSE; from regional aerospace, engineering and information technology companies; and government agencies. EP offers master’s degrees in 25 areas, 14 of which are based at APL and chaired by APL’s technical professional staff members. Courses are taught at seven locations in the Baltimore-Washington metropolitan area, including the APL Education Center.

APL's STEM Academy includes several programs that provide a pathway to science, technology, engineering and math careers for students in grades 3–12. APL’s core programs are designed to be complementary and are grounded in an integrated model that ensures children learn about what being a STEM professional means.

Programs include Maryland MESA, an after-school offering for students in grades 3-12; the STEM Academy, an after-school course program for middle and high school students in grades 8-12; APL's Student Program to Inspire, Relate and Enrich (ASPIRE), which allows high school juniors and seniors to experience and explore STEM careers before college; and Pathways, APL’s college internship program.

== Research ==
APL operates across 13 mission areas, encompassing disciplines such as undersea systems, space exploration, cybersecurity and biological sciences. Its teams apply systems engineering and technical expertise to support the development, testing and integration of technologies for national security and scientific research.

The Laboratory works in coordination with government sponsors and industry partners to align research and development priorities with mission needs. Its efforts focus on transitioning technologies into operational use, supporting both prototype development and broader implementation by external organizations.

APL's portfolio includes longstanding areas of work such as air and missile defense and undersea warfare, as well as research addressing emerging domains and strategic priorities. These include autonomous systems, hypersonic systems, survivability and performance, artificial intelligence, assured autonomy, biomanufacturing and next-generation materials.

=== National Security and Homeland Defense ===
APL plays a significant role in air and missile defense, hypersonics, strike and power projection, submarine security, antisubmarine warfare, strategic systems evaluation and cyber operations to support national security. Historical contributions include the radio proximity fuze and surface-to-air missiles.

Recent efforts have included the Aegis Weapon System and Cooperative Engagement Capability. These efforts and others address global threats, enabling the military to detect, track and intercept threats such as ballistic missiles, cruise missiles and uncrewed aerial vehicles.

=== Advanced Manufacturing ===
APL’s work in advancing additive manufacturing focuses on materials science, precision engineering and rapid prototyping to support operational readiness, particularly in remote and extreme environments.

APL has played a critical role in advancing a precise metal 3D-printing process to support ship maintenance and repair at sea. In 2023, when a Navy ship encountered a material failure in a key component, APL and the ship’s crew reverse-engineered the part to create a digital file and additively manufacture it in just five days — a fraction of the time it would take for traditional procurement. APL continues to explore advanced fabrication methods to enable maintenance, repair and mission resilience in contested or resource-limited settings.

=== Artificial Intelligence and Autonomy ===
APL conducts research in artificial intelligence, machine learning and autonomous systems across domains such as defense, healthcare and space. Efforts include developing secure, reliable algorithms and platforms with an emphasis on human–machine teaming and system transparency. APL also explores alternative computing paradigms, including quantum information science and neuromorphic architectures, to support advanced autonomy and communications.

Researchers from APL have helped accelerate the delivery of autonomous systems to warfighters through a program under the Office of the Under Secretary of Defense for Research and Engineering to rapidly integrate, test and assess low-cost uncrewed maritime systems.

=== Space ===
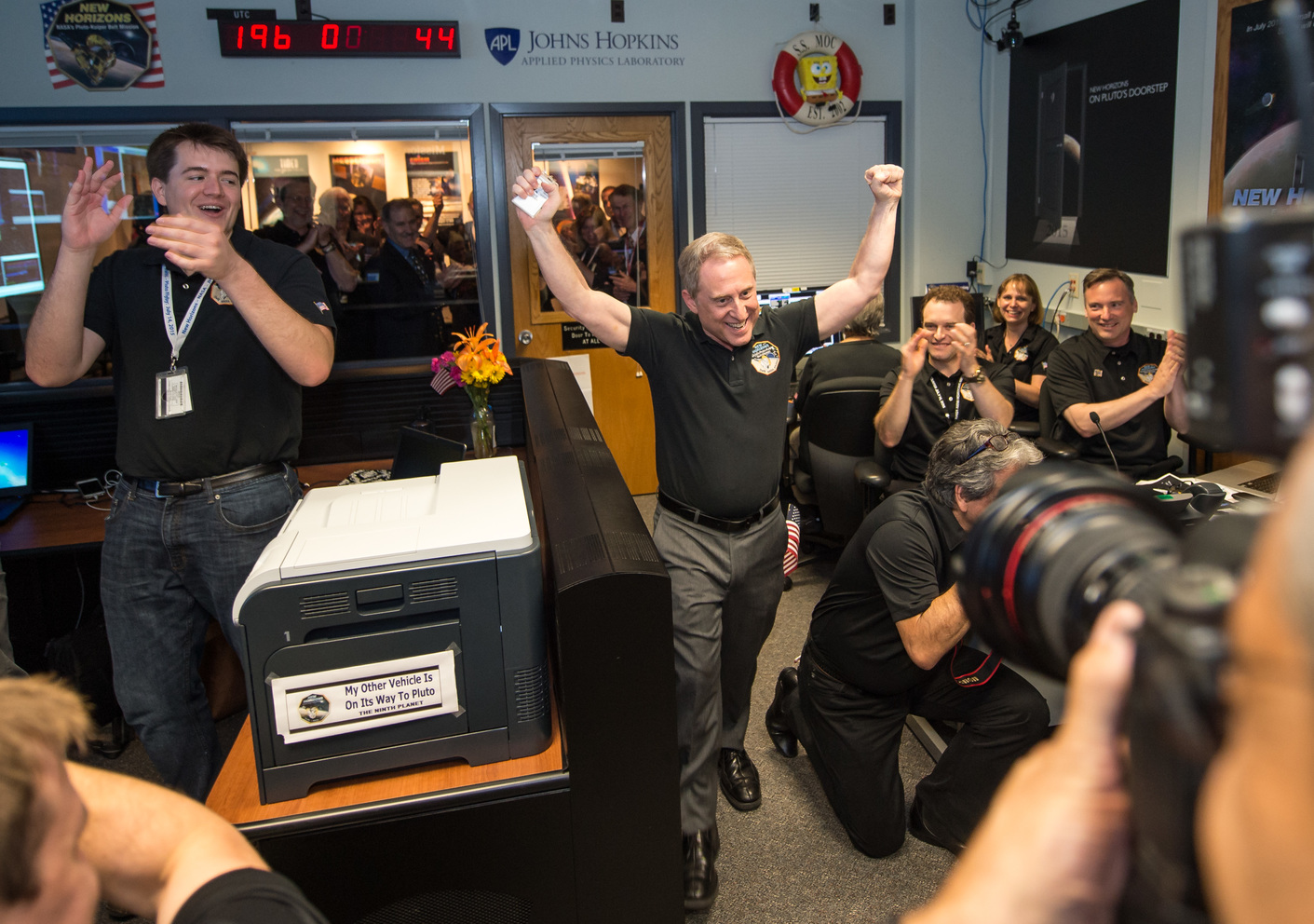
Alan Stern celebrating the successful flyby of Pluto by New Horizons in 2015 in the APL Mission Operations Center.

APL has built and operated many NASA spacecraft, including NEAR Shoemaker; ACE (Advanced Composition Explorer); TIMED; CONTOUR; MESSENGER; STEREO (A & B); Van Allen Probes; New Horizons; Parker Solar Probe; the DART planetary-defense mission; and the IMAP heliophysics mission. APL has also provided major systems and instruments for other NASA efforts, including EZIE (Electrojet Zeeman Imaging Explorer), Lunar Vertex, and hardware/instruments for Europa Clipper.

APL’s space work began in the late 1950s/early 1960s with Navy-sponsored satellites such as the Transit (satellite) navigation system and later Geosat. In the early 1990s, NASA established the Discovery Program for competitively selected, cost-capped, principal-investigator-led planetary missions; APL built NEAR Shoemaker, the program’s first mission, and later developed MESSENGER, the first Mercury orbiter. In November 2021, APL’s DART spacecraft launched and on 26 September 2022 deliberately impacted the asteroid moonlet Dimorphos, measurably shortening its orbital period around Didymos by about 33 minutes—the first demonstration of kinetic asteroid deflection.

APL’s space work is managed by the Lab's Space Exploration Sector. The sector manages spacecraft integration high bays and cleanrooms; environmental test facilities (“shake and bake”), such as thermal-vacuum chambers and vibration tables; and a Multi-Mission Operations Center that can operate several spacecraft concurrently from pre-launch through end-of-mission.

In 2024, the team of engineers and scientists from APL, NASA and more than 40 other partner organizations across the country that created the Parker Solar Probe were awarded the 2024 Robert J. Collier Trophy by the National Aeronautic Association (NAA). In 2024, during its record-breaking pass by the Sun, NASA's Parker Solar Probe captured new images from the Sun's atmosphere – the closest ever taken to the Sun.

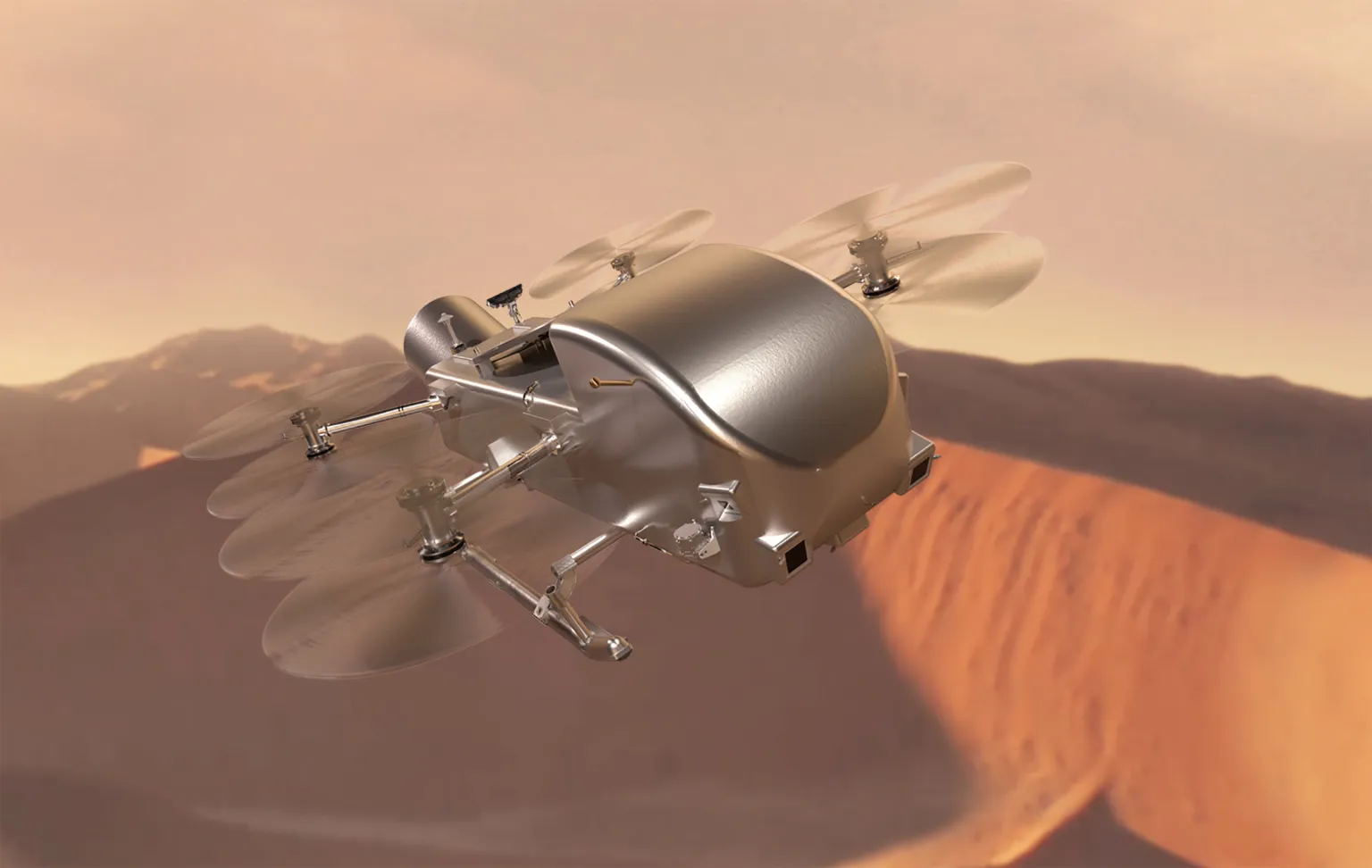
Artist’s concept of NASA’s Dragonfly rotorcraft-lander on Titan.

Ongoing and upcoming missions. In 2019, NASA selected the APL-proposed Dragonfly rotorcraft as the fourth New Frontiers mission, a relocatable lander designed to fly to multiple sites on Titan to study prebiotic chemistry and potential habitability. APL also manages NASA’s Parker Solar Probe, which on December 24, 2024, became the closest human-made object to the Sun, approaching to about 3.8 million miles (6.2 million kilometers) above the solar surface and matching that record again in 2025. In heliophysics, APL operates the Interstellar Mapping and Acceleration Probe (IMAP), Launched in 2025 to map the boundary of the heliosphere and study the acceleration of energetic particles.

The asteroid 132524 APL was named in honor of APL after a flyby by the New Horizons spacecraft.

=== Health & Bioengineering ===
APL conducts research in neuroengineering, brain–computer interfaces, advanced prosthetics, public health digital twins, and biological systems to drive innovative medical applications for the military and emergency situations. These efforts include augmented reality-assisted medical care for emergency response and a brain organoid platform to study the effects of mild blast-induced traumatic brain injury.

In 2014, APL led the DARPA-funded Revolutionizing Prosthetics program, culminating in the development of the Modular Prosthetic Limb — a fully artificial articulated arm and hand. The device was successfully controlled by a bilateral shoulder-level amputee, using pattern recognition algorithms that tracked muscle contractions to move the prosthetic in conjunction with the amputee's body.

APL extended the technology in a 2016 demonstration in which a paralyzed man was able to “fist-bump” with then-President Barack Obama using signals sent from an implanted brain chip. The limb also returned sensory feedback from the arm to the wearer's brain. In 2023, APL researchers developed a wearable thin-film thermoelectric cooler (TFTEC) — one of the world's smallest, most intense and fastest refrigeration devices. The TFTEC helps amputees perceive a sense of temperature with their phantom limbs. The technology won an R&D 100 Award in 2023 and in collaboration with Samsung, APL researchers have extended the TFTEC technology to practical solid state refrigeration applications.

In January 2020, as the COVID-19 pandemic emerged, Johns Hopkins University launched the Coronavirus Resource Center — commonly known as the COVID-19 dashboard — which became the most widely used and trusted source for near-real-time global data on the pandemic. The dashboard was initially developed by a team at the Whiting School of Engineering led by associate professor Lauren Gardner. As the volume of incoming data quickly overwhelmed manual processing, the university turned to APL. Researchers at APL automated the data collection, aggregation and curation processes, and contributed essential analysis and visualizations. Their work was instrumental in maintaining the accuracy and usability of the dashboard, which served governments, media and the public throughout the pandemic.

== Transportation ==
APL is located on Johns Hopkins Road, around 1/2 mile west of U.S. Route 29. The facility is off Interstate 95 and Maryland Route 32.

A bus shuttle started operation in the fall of 2019 from APL to Laurel station (MARC). On September 8, 2026, Montgomery County's Flash BRT bus system extended to APL.

== Notable people ==
- James Adams
- Jacqueline Akinpelu
- John Allen
- Ralph Asher Alpher
- William Avery
- Norman Augustine
- Ralph Belknap Baldwin
- Robert Behler
- Frederick Billig
- S. M. Blinder
- Raquel Bono
- Gwendolyn Boyd
- Alice Bowman
- Isaiah Bowman
- Robert Braun
- Anne Brennan
- Robert Brode
- Ben Bussey
- Robert Cahalan
- Carlos Del Castillo
- Nancy Chabot
- James Christy
- Edward Cochran
- Paul Dabbar
- Richard Danzig
- Brett Denevi
- Lisa Disbrow
- Andre Douglas
- Ashutosh Dutta
- Carlos Del Castillo
- Robert Farquhar
- Robert Fischell
- Christine Fox
- M. Parker Givens
- Nicola Fox
- David Goldfein
- Kevin Granata
- Michael Griffin
- Lawrence Hafstad
- Stephen Hadley
- Cecil Haney
- Avril Haines
- Robert Herman
- Helen Hopfield
- J. Allen Hynek
- Paul Kaminski
- Chih-Kung Jen
- Ave Kludze
- Christina Koch
- Charles Kowal
- Tom Krimigis
- Robert Lai
- William LaPlante
- Samuel Locklear
- Ramón E. López
- Ellen Lord
- Ralph Lorenz
- Victor McCrary
- Heather Murren Miller
- James N. Miller
- Gordon Moore
- John S. Morgan
- Katherine Morse
- Robert Russell Newton
- Pete Nanos
- Vivian O'Brien
- Paul Oostburg Sanz
- Kathleen Paige
- Eugene Parker
- Christine Piatko
- Fritz Karl Preikschat
- Louise Prockter
- Richard Potember
- Kaliat Ramesh
- Charles Richard
- Gary Roughead
- John Richardson
- Robert Rubin
- Michael Ryschkewitsch
- Ralph Semmel
- Ciara Sivels
- Nicholas Smith Jr.
- Paul Spudis
- Ferdinand Stoss
- Sabine Stanley
- James Stavridis
- Paul Stockton
- Rob Strain
- Pierre Thuot
- Edward Weldon Tunstel
- Elizabeth Turtle
- Merle Tuve
- James Van Allen
- Carol Stuart Watson
- Hal Weaver
- Glen VanHerck
- Dave Van Wie
- Robert Work

== See also ==
- List of United States college laboratories conducting basic defense research
