= Jacqueline Akinpelu =

American applied mathematician and operations researcher

- Born: Jacqueline McKinney
- Education: Duke University (BA, 1975); Johns Hopkins University (PhD, 1980)
- Awards: 2011 Diversity Award, 2017 Heritage Award
- Scientific career
- Fields: mathematics
- Institutions: Bell Labs; Johns Hopkins University
- Thesis: Optimal Multi-Product Scheduling on One Machine Over a Finite Horizon (1980)
- Academic advisors: Eliezer Naddor

Jacqueline M. Akinpelu (born 1953, née McKinney) is an American applied mathematician and operations researcher who worked at Bell Labs on network performance under overloaded conditions, and later, as a research manager at the Applied Physics Laboratory of Johns Hopkins University, developed a pipeline for students from Morgan State University to mentor them into careers in STEM fields.

== Early life and education ==
Akinpelu is African-American, and originally from Winston-Salem, North Carolina, where she was raised by a poor single mother in the 1960s. She was educated in the public school system there, and majored in mathematics at Duke University, graduating magna cum laude in 1975.

She completed her doctorate in 1980, from the Johns Hopkins University Department of Applied Mathematics and Statistics, with the dissertation Optimal Multi-Product Scheduling on One Machine Over a Finite Horizon supervised by Eliezer Naddor. Her doctoral research related to inventory management in operations research.

== Career and later life ==
Akinpelu became a researcher at Bell Labs in 1980, and continued to work there and its successor, AT&T Labs, for 25 years. Her early work there involved network performance under overloaded conditions, and signaling protocols in voice networks. Her later work at Bell was as a manager for the planning and maintenance of AT&T's long distance telephone network, as head of the Network Capacity Operation Systems Planning Department. She was also influential in recruiting members of disadvantaged groups to AT&T, and was an advocate for considering the different needs and characteristics of different ethnic and national groups rather than lumping them all together.

In 2006, she moved to the Johns Hopkins University Applied Physics Laboratory, starting as a performance engineer and assistant group supervisor, and later becoming an assistant branch supervisor. There, she built an outreach and mentoring program with Morgan State University, connecting students there to STEM careers, before eventually retiring.

== Recognition ==
In 2009, she was honored in Women of Color magazine as a recipient of the 2009 Women of Color Technology Award for Career Achievement in Government.

Johns Hopkins University gave her their 2011 Diversity Award, and the Johns Hopkins Alumni Association gave her their 2017 Heritage Award.
