= Robert Johnson (tight end) =

American football player (born 1980)

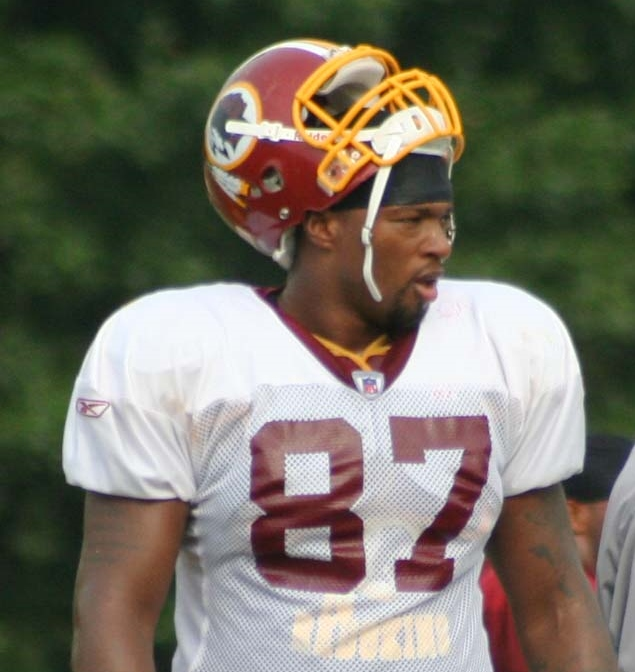

No. 82, 87
- Position: Tight end

Personal information
- Born: June 20, 1980 (age 46); Montgomery, Alabama
- Listed height: 6 ft 6 in (1.98 m)
- Listed weight: 278 lb (126 kg)

Career information
- High school: Jefferson Davis (Montgomery)
- College: Auburn
- NFL draft: 2003: undrafted

Career history
- Atlanta Falcons (2003)*; Chicago Bears (2003); Tampa Bay Buccaneers (2004–2005)*; Washington Redskins (2005–2006); Carolina Panthers (2006)*; New Orleans Saints (2006–2007)*
- * Offseason or practice squad member only

Awards and highlights
- Capital One Bowl champion (2002)

Career NFL statistics
- Receiving yards: 14
- Stats at Pro Football Reference

Robert Johnson (born June 20, 1980) is an American former professional football player who was a tight end in the National Football League (NFL). He played college football for the Auburn Tigers.

== Early life and college ==
Born in Montgomery, Alabama, Johnson graduated from Jefferson Davis High School of Montgomery in 1999 and attended the Hargrave Military Academy for one year after graduating high school. He then attended Auburn University and played on the Auburn Tigers football team from 2000 to 2002. After his junior year, Johnson declared for the 2003 NFL draft.

== Professional career ==
Pre-draft measurables
Height	Weight	Arm length	Hand span	40-yard dash	10-yard split	20-yard split	20-yard shuttle	Three-cone drill	Vertical jump	Broad jump	Bench press	Wonderlic
6 ft 6 in (1.98 m)	278 lb (126 kg)	33 1/4 in (0.84 m)	9 3/8 in (0.24 m)	4.96 s	1.78 s	2.93 s	4.47 s	7.15 s	33 1/2 in (0.85 m)	9 ft 7 in (2.92 m)	18 reps	19
Measurements were taken at the NFL Scouting Combine.

Johnson signed as an undrafted free agent with the Chicago Bears in 2003. He left the Bears to join the Washington Redskins with whom he spent one season before being released in August 2006. Johnson subsequently signed with the New Orleans Saints.
