= Robert Cahalan =

American climatologist

- Born: November 24, 1946 (age 79)
- Education: University of Illinois
- Occupation: Climatologist
- Spouse: Margaret Cahalan (m. 1968)
- Children: 2
- Awards: NASA Exceptional Service Medal

Robert F. Cahalan (born November 24, 1946) is an Emeritus Scientist at NASA's Goddard Space Flight Center. He was the chief of the Laboratory for Climate and Radiation from 2003 to 2013, a Project Scientist of the Solar Radiation and Climate Experiment and the president of the International Radiation Commission of the International Association of Meteorology and Atmospheric Sciences (a member of the International Union of Geodesy and Geophysics) from 2008 to 2012. His interests include climate change, energy balance, remote sensing, and solar radiation.

== Biography ==
Cahalan grew up in Miamisburg, Ohio and Cincinnati, Ohio and received his master's degree and Doctorate in physics from the University of Illinois in 1969 and 1973. After a two-year post-doc at Syracuse University, and a third year as Visiting Professor there, he became a senior post-doc at the National Center for Atmospheric Research after which he joined NASA Goddard Space Flight Center as a civil servant. There he spent 1979–present, retiring from civil service in 2015 to become Emeritus Scientist. In 2015 he also joined the Johns Hopkins Applied Physics Laboratory as a Senior Scientist.

In 2003–2006 he was the founding chair of the Observations Working Group of the U.S. Global Change Research Program (USGCRP) reported on the status of Earth Observations in an annual report to the US Congress and assisted in coordinating the National Climate Assessment.

Cahalan received the 2006 NASA Exceptional Service Medal, the 2006 NOAA medal for "Outstanding Leadership and Service," and in 2009 was elected a Fellow of the American Meteorological Society.

Cahalan now lives in Greenbelt, Maryland with his wife Margaret Cahalan, whom he married in 1968. He has two sons, Joel and Gabriel. In 2005, Cahalan and his wife founded CHEARS, the Chesapeake Education, Arts, and Research Society, a non-profit organisation dedicated to promoting ecological stewardship and artistic expression in the Chesapeake area.
