= Gwendolyn Boyd =

American scientist and university administrator

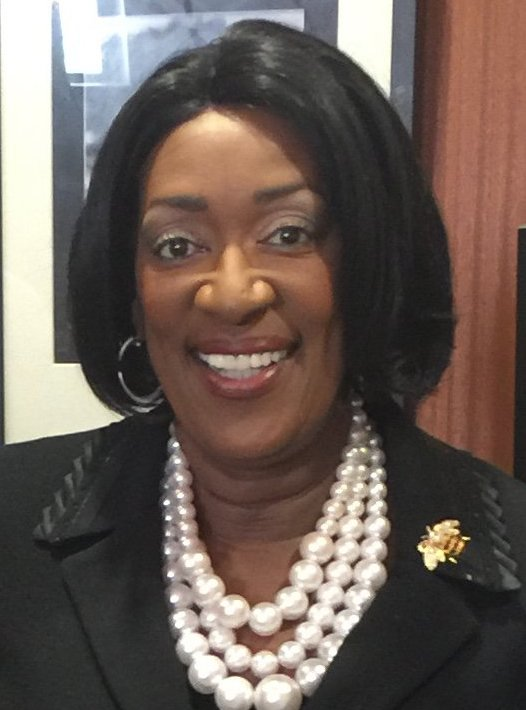
- Gwendolyn Boyd in 2015
- Born: December 27, 1955 (age 70); Montgomery, Alabama, US
- Education: Alabama State University, BS; Yale University, MS; Howard University, M.Div and DMin
- Occupation: Mechanical engineer
- Years active: 1980-2013
- Employer: Johns Hopkins Applied Physics Laboratory
- Known for: President of Alabama State University

Gwendolyn Elizabeth Boyd (born December 27, 1955) is an American scientist and university administrator. She served as president of Alabama State University from 2014 to 2016. Before entering administration, she worked as a mechanical engineer at the Johns Hopkins University Applied Physics Laboratory.

== Early life and education ==
Boyd was born in Montgomery, Alabama, on December 27, 1955. Her mother was Dora Lee McClain. She was orphaned at the age of thirteen, and then raised by her godmother, Emzella Mapson. She attended McDavid Elementary School. Boyd was one of the first five black students to attend Jefferson Davis High Schoolgraduating as valedictorian in 1973.

Boyd won a scholarship to Alabama State University, where she graduated in 1977 with a Bachelor of Science in mathematics. While at Alabama State, she joined Delta Sigma Theta. She went on to Yale University, in 1979 graduating with a Master of Science degree in mechanical engineering (specializing in acoustics). She received a master's of divinity and a doctorate in ministry from Howard University in 2007.

== Career ==
After graduating, she briefly worked for IBM in Kingston, New York. In 1980, Boyd joined the Johns Hopkins Applied Physics Laboratory (APL) in Laurel, Maryland. She initially worked in the laboratory's Strategic Systems Department, testing and evaluating submarine navigation systems. In 1998, Boyd became the assistant for APL's development programs. In 2004, she was promoted to the executive assistant to the chief of staff.

She was also appointed to Johns Hopkins' Diversity Leadership Council, serving as chair from 2003 to 2005. In 2009, the Obama administration appointed her to the board of the Barry M. Goldwater Scholarship foundation.

In December 2013, Boyd's alma mater, Alabama State University, announced that she had been appointed as the university's next president, with a term beginning in February 2014. She became the first woman to hold the position. Her new contract contained a clause granting her right of residency in the president's house, but only if she did not "cohabitate with any person with whom she has a romantic relation", which attracted some public attention.

In November 2016, Boyd's presidency was suspended by the ASU board of trustees at a meeting which had initially been called to discuss the university's budget. The following month, the board voted 8–6 to terminate her contract, citing "failure to maintain the confidence of the board".

== Honors ==
Boyd has received honorary doctorates from Bennett College and Lincoln University.

== Personal life ==
Boyd was national president of the Delta Sigma Theta sorority from 2000 to 2004 and is also a member of The Links. She served on the board of directors of Bennett College, the Children’s National Medical Center, Leadership Greater Washington, and the National Partnership for Community Leadership. She is an ordained itinerant elder in the African Methodist Episcopal Church and belongs to the Ebenezer A.M.E Church in Fort Washington, Maryland.
