= Edward Weldon Tunstel =

IEEE Fellow

Edward Weldon Tunstel from Johns Hopkins Applied Physics Laboratory, in Laurel, Maryland was named Fellow of the Institute of Electrical and Electronics Engineers (IEEE) in 2012 for contributions to space robotic system applications on planetary missions.
