= Johnson Abernathy Graetz High School =

Location
- 3420 Carter Hill Road; Montgomery, Alabama 36111; United States; 32°20′37″N 86°15′39″W

Information
- Former name: Jefferson Davis High School
- School type: Public
- Motto: Those who stay will be champions!
- Established: 1968 (58 years ago)
- CEEB code: 011892
- Principal: Phillip Brooks
- Staff: 79.50 (FTE)
- Grades: 9–12
- Enrollment: 1,592 (2023–2024)
- Student to teacher ratio: 20.02
- Colors: Purple & gold
- Nickname: Jaguars
- Website: www.mps.k12.al.us/o/jag

Johnson Abernathy Graetz High School (formerly Jefferson Davis High School) is a public high school with grades 9 through 12 located in Montgomery, Alabama, United States. The principal is Mr. Phillip Brooks. The school is part of the Montgomery Public Schools system.

== History ==
The school was named after the only-ever president of the Confederate States of America, Jefferson Davis, in the 1960s, a century after the Confederacy collapsed.

In 2020, the school district's board of education voted to change the school's name from Jefferson Davis High School, a decision that was affirmed in 2022 despite two years of opposition from local pro-Confederacy groups. The school is to be renamed JAG High School, in honor of three civil rights leaders: Frank Minis Johnson, a judge who ruled in favor of Rosa Parks to strike down segregation policies in Montgomery; pastor and activist Ralph Abernathy; and Robert Graetz, a minister who helped organize the Montgomery Bus Boycott.

== Notable alumni ==
- Travis Bell, professional football nose tackle
- Craig Brazell, former MLB player
- Gwendolyn Boyd, former president of Alabama State University and Delta Sigma Theta sorority; valedictorian in 1973
- Artur Davis, former Democratic Congressman of Alabama
- Ladarius Gunter, former NFL player
- Michael Henig, former college football quarterback
- Glenn Howerton, actor, writer, and producer
- Jamey Johnson, country music singer and songwriter
- Robert Johnson, former NFL player
- Octavia Spencer (1988), actress
- Curtis Stewart, former NFL player
- George Teague, former NFL player
- George Thornton, former NFL player
- Lou Thornton, former MLB player
- Jasmine Walker, WNBA player
- Davern Williams, former NFL player

== Enrollment, demographics ==
Enrollment for 2007 was 1,508 students; 48 percent was male and 52 percent was female. Ethnicities enrolled at the school were white, black, and Hispanic. African-American enrollment was 94 percent, white enrollment was 2 percent, Hispanic enrollment was 2 percent, and Asian enrollment was 1%.
