= Robert Russell Newton =

American physicist, astronomer and science historian (1918–1991)

- Born: July 7, 1918
- Died: June 2, 1991 (aged 72)
- Citizenship: United States
- Known for: The Crime of Claudius Ptolemy
- Scientific career
- Fields: Physics, astronomy, science historian
- Workplaces: Applied Physics Laboratory at Johns Hopkins University

Robert Russell Newton (July 7, 1918 – June 2, 1991) was an American physicist, astronomer, and historian of science.

Newton was Supervisor of the Applied Physics Laboratory at Johns Hopkins University.

Newton was known for his book The Crime of Claudius Ptolemy (1977). In Newton's view, Ptolemy was "the most successful fraud in the history of science". Newton claimed that Ptolemy had predominantly obtained the astronomical results described in his work The Almagest by computation, and not by the direct observations that Ptolemy described. Distrust of Ptolemy's observations goes back at least as far as doubts raised in the 16th century by Tycho Brahe and in the 18th century by Delambre. R. R. Newton also made a charge of conscious falsification.

Newton was also known for his work on change of the rotation rate of the earth, and historical observations of eclipses; however, his results “are simply meaningless.” His steps were rarely detailed, his reasoning rarely explained.

== Bibliography ==
- Rosser, J. Barkley; Newton, Robert R.; Gross, George L. (1947). Mathematical Theory of Rocket Flight. New York, NY: McGraw-Hill Books Company.
- Newton, Robert R. (1959). "Periodic orbits of a planetoid passing close to two gravitating masses". Smithsonian Contributions to Astrophysics. 3 (7): 69–78. Bibcode:1959SCoA....3...69N. doi:10.5479/si.00810231.3-7.69.
- Newton, Robert R. (1970). Ancient Astronomical Observations and the Accelerations of the Earth and Moon. Baltimore, MD: Johns Hopkins University Press. ISBN 978-0-8018-1180-7.
- Newton, Robert R. (1972). Medieval Chronicles and the Rotation of the Earth. Baltimore, MD: Johns Hopkins University Press. ISBN 978-0-8018-1402-0.
- Newton, Robert R. (1976). Ancient Planetary Observations and the Validity of Ephemeris Time. Baltimore, MD: Johns Hopkins University Press. ISBN 978-0-8018-1842-4.
- Newton, Robert R. (1977). The Crime of Claudius Ptolemy. Baltimore, MD: Johns Hopkins University Press. ISBN 978-0-8018-1990-2 – via Internet Archive.
- Newton, Robert R. (1979). The Moon's Acceleration and Its Physical Origins. Vol. 1: The Moon's acceleration – as deduced from Solar eclipses. Baltimore, MD: Johns Hopkins University Press. Bibcode:1979msai.book.....N. ISBN 0-8018-2216-5. LCCN 78-20529.
- Newton, Robert R. (1984). The Moon's Acceleration and Its Physical Origins. Vol. 2: As deduced from general lunar observations. Baltimore, MD: Johns Hopkins University Press. Bibcode:1984maip.book.....N. ISBN 0-8018-2639-X.
