= Travis Bell (disambiguation) =

Travis Bell (born 1998) is an American football player.

Travis Bell may also refer to:

- Travis Bell, American football player, see 2007 Miami Hurricanes football team
- Travis Bell (born 1978), Canadian ice hockey player who was named to the 2003 ECAC Hockey All-Tournament Team
- Travis Bell (Killer7), a character in Killer7
