= David Van Wie (engineer) =

American engineer

Dave Van Wie
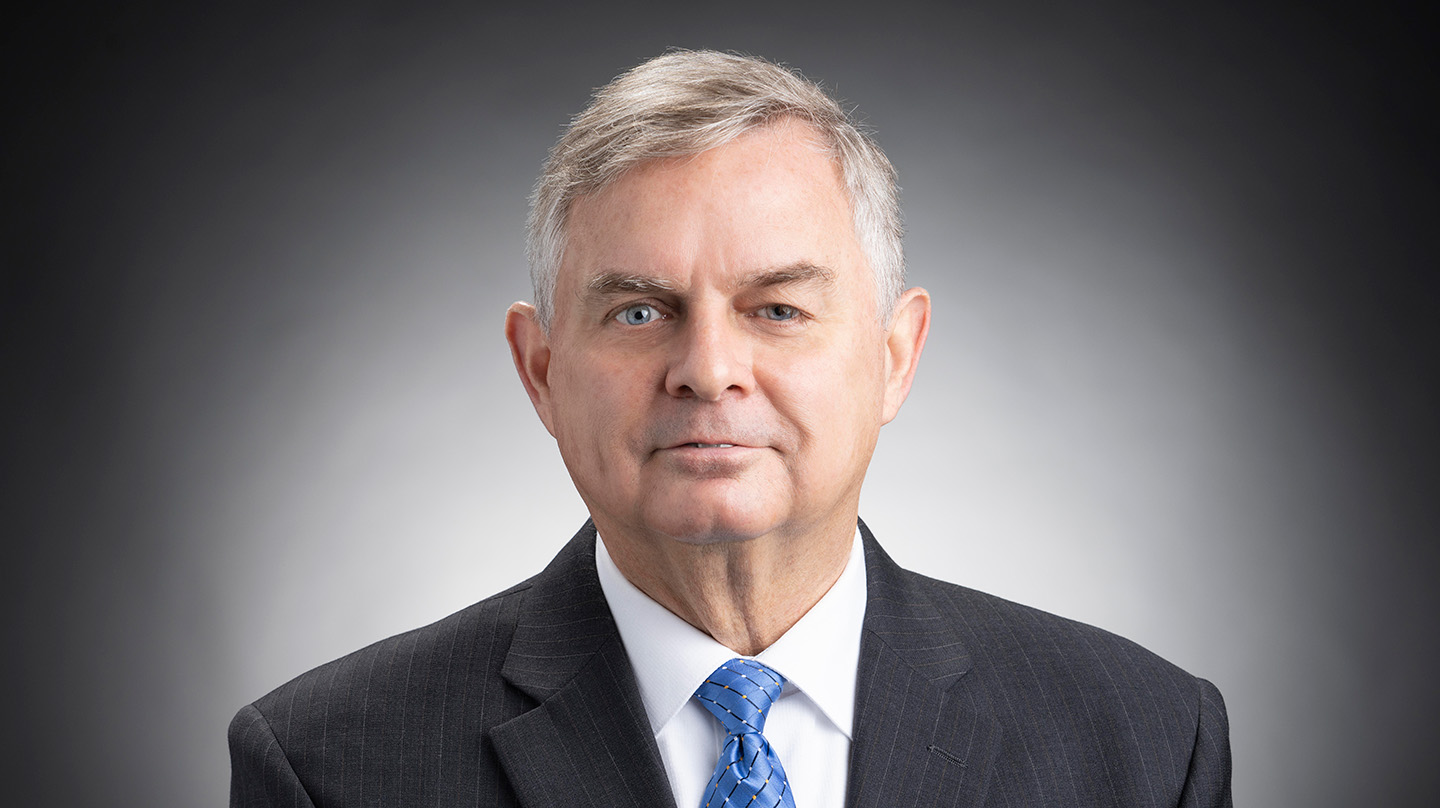
- Education: University of Maryland, Johns Hopkins University
- Awards: AIAA Theodore van Kármán Lectureship in astronautics, Kevin C. Greenaugh Award, Air Force Award for Meritorious Civilian Service, National Academy of Engineering member
- Scientific career
- Fields: Aerospace engineering, Hypersonics
- Workplaces: Johns Hopkins Applied Physics Laboratory
- Website: APL Bio

David M. Van Wie is an American aerospace engineer. He became the ninth director of the Johns Hopkins Applied Physics Laboratory (APL) on July 14, 2025. He is known for his expertise in hypersonics, aerospace systems, and national defense technology.

== Biography ==
Van Wie received his Bachelor of Science (summa cum laude), Master of Science, and Ph.D. in aerospace engineering from the University of Maryland Clark School of Engineering. He later earned a Master of Science in electrical engineering from Johns Hopkins University.

In 2016, he was inducted into the University of Maryland Department of Aerospace Engineering’s Academy of Distinguished Alumni.

== Career ==
Van Wie joined APL in 1983 and has held numerous leadership positions at the Lab. Most recently, he served as head of APL’s Air and Missile Defense Sector, overseeing strategic planning, execution, and performance of programs aimed at strengthening defense of the U.S. homeland, deployed forces, and allies and partners.

Previously, he served as the Lab’s mission area executive for Precision Strike, where he was responsible for advanced weapon development, electromagnetic spectrum operations, and long-range detection and targeting systems. He also served as chief technologist for the mission area, leading technology initiatives to support asymmetric, multi-domain systems designed for anti-access/area denial (A2/AD) environments.

APL had a wide variety of accomplishments under Van Wie's leadership, including seeing the Lab selected as one of Fast Company's Best Workplaces for Innovators and Most Innovative Companies, and ComputerWorld's Top 10 Best Places to Work in IT.

== Research ==
Van Wie has authored more than 140 technical publications across fields such as high-temperature fluid dynamics, plasma aerodynamics, and hypersonic propulsion systems. His work is frequently cited in the context of advanced airbreathing hypersonic vehicle design, scramjet technology, and missile defense applications.

Notable publications include his 2021 article, “Hypersonics: Past, Present, and Potential Future,” which outlines the evolution of hypersonic technologies and their implications for national defense. He has also co-authored works on scramjet propulsion and hypersonic environmental challenges that are frequently referenced in the aerospace field.

A frequent speaker at technical conferences, Van Wie delivered the 2021 American Institute of Aeronautics and Astronautics (AIAA) von Kármán Lecture in Astronautics. He has also presented at the Mach Conference and the University Consortium for Applied Hypersonics.

== Honors and Recognition ==
Van Wie was elected to the National Academy of Engineering in 2017 for his contributions to hypersonic technology enabling new classes of flight vehicles. He is an AIAA fellow and a recipient of the Air Force Award for Meritorious Civilian Service and in 2021 was awarded the AIAA Theodore van Kármán Lectureship in Astronautics.

In 2024, he received the inaugural Kevin C. Greenaugh Award from the University of Maryland for leadership, innovation, and national security impact.

Van Wie has also been recognized for sustained contributions to the Joint Army, Navy, NASA, and Air Force (JANNAF) Airbreathing Propulsion Subcommittee.

== Government and Advisory Roles ==
Van Wie has contributed to numerous federal advisory panels, including the Defense Science Board, the U.S. Air Force Scientific Advisory Board, and committees under the National Academies of Science, Engineering, and Medicine. His advisory work has addressed topics such as conventional prompt global strike, reusable launch vehicles and vehicle systems, civil booster systems, Air Force development planning, survivability, missile defense, civil aeronautics and national security space protection.

Van Wie previously served as a member of the National Academies’ Aeronautics and Space Engineering Board.

== Professional Affiliations ==
Van Wie is a member of the National Academy of Engineering and a fellow of the American Institute of Aeronautics and Astronautics (AIAA). He holds a faculty appointment in the Department of Mechanical Engineering at Johns Hopkins University and teaches within the university’s Engineering for Professionals program.

In addition, he has lectured extensively at the University of Maryland in the areas of hypersonics, fluid dynamics, and space propulsion.
