= Frederick S. Billig =

American aerospace engineer (1933-2006)

- Born: February 28, 1933; Pittsburgh, Pennsylvania
- Died: June 1, 2006 (aged 73)
- Education: Johns Hopkins University
- Occupation: Aerospace engineer
- Employers: Johns Hopkins University Applied Physics Laboratory (1955-1980); University of Maryland (1964-1989); Virginia Tech
- Organizations: Founder, International Society of Air Breathing Engines; Institute of Aeronautics and Astronautics
- Spouse: Peggy Billig
- Children: 4
- Awards: National Academy of Engineering (1995); Innovation Hall of Fame (1997)

Frederick Stucky Billig (February 28, 1933 – June 1, 2006) was an American aerospace engineer who was a pioneer in the development of scramjet propulsion.

Billig's primary research was in the area of high-speed, air-breathing propulsion for advanced flight vehicles including pioneering work in external burning and supersonic combustion. He was responsible for highspeed propulsion programs sponsored by the U.S. Navy, the U.S. Air Force and NASA.

== Early life ==
He was born on February 28, 1933, in Pittsburgh, Pennsylvania. He grew up in the Maryland suburbs of Washington, D.C. As a boy, Billig was an avid sports fan and participated in many contests on basketball statistics.

== Education ==
Billig received his undergraduate education at Johns Hopkins University, graduating in 1955 with a Bachelor of Engineering degree in mechanical engineering.

Following graduation, Billig began his career in the Johns Hopkins University Applied Physics Laboratory in 1955. He entered the University of Maryland’s Department of Mechanical Engineering as a part-time student earning his M.S. degree in 1958 and Ph.D. in 1964.

While working at Applied Physics Laboratory, Billig spent 25 years as an adjunct professor in Maryland's Aerospace Engineering Department from 1964 to 1989. He also taught at Virginia Tech, where he served on Ph.D. committees up until the time of his death.

== Applied Physics Laboratory ==
In his early career in the JHU Applied Physics Lab, Billig worked on hypersonic propulsion and vehicles. He was mentored by William Avery and Gordon Drucker.

In 1963, Billig was promoted to the position of senior engineer and supervisor of hypersonic ramjets.

In the 1970s, Billig accepted an assignment in the Submarine Security Program at the Applied Physics Laboratory.

Billig later returned to the Aeronautics Department, where he was appointed chief scientist in 1987.

== Scramjet Patent ==
In 1964, Billig and Gordon L. Dugger submitted a patent application for a supersonic combustion ramjet based on Billig's Ph.D. thesis. This patent was issued in 1981 following the removal of an order of secrecy.

Billig's patent was for a supersonic scramjet-powered missile, designed for the Navy. The patented design was capable of flight at five to 10 times the speed of sound. Billig and Dugger made and ground-tested a proposed engine and later modifications.

The scramjet described in the 1981 patent offered reliable low-cost production, a movable internal body as a combustion chamber, a fuel tank, and a computer-controlled turbine for internal power.

Billig was awarded six additional patents involving design features of hypersonic vehicles.

== National Aerospace Plane ==
Billig was Program Manager of the National Aerospace Plane (NASP) Project at the Applied Physics Laboratory (JHU/APL). The X-30 NASP was an attempt by the United States to create a viable single-stage-to-orbit (SSTO) spacecraft.

President Ronald Reagan described NASP in his 1986 State of the Union address as "...a new Orient Express that could, by the end of the next decade, take off from Dulles Airport and accelerate up to twenty-five times the speed of sound, attaining low earth orbit or flying to Tokyo within two hours..."

There were six identifiable technologies which were considered critical to the success of the NASP project. Three of these "enabling" technologies were related to the propulsion system, which would consist of a hydrogen-fueled scramjet. As project lead at JHU, Billig performed leading edge research in support of the NASP propulsion development.

The NASP program became the Hypersonic Systems Technology Program (HySTP) in late 1994. HySTP was designed to transfer the accomplishments made in hypersonic technologies by the National Aero-Space Plane (NASP) program into a technology development program. On January 27, 1995, the Air Force terminated participation in (HySTP).

== Pyrodyne, Inc. ==
Billig retired as Associate Head and Chief Scientist of the Aeronautics Department at the JHU/APL in 1996 and became President of Pyrodyne, Inc. Pyrodyne was a research company established by Billig, Lance S. Jacobsen, then a student at Virginia Tech, and Linda A. Baumler, Billig's daughter. Dr. Ray Fuller was also critical in initial formation from 1999 to 2000. Pyrodyne was based in Glenwood, Maryland, Billig's home. In 2005, the company had four employees, including an office in Dayton, Ohio.

Pyrodyne was awarded a contract by Aerojet for engine design work on the Falcon project. Falcon was a $124 million Defense Advanced Research Projects Agency (DARPA) project led by Lockheed Martin. Sacramento, Calif.-based Aerojet was awarded a $15 million subcontract to the project and passed along much of the engine research work to Pyrodyne. Pyrodyne designed the flow line of the engines, the geometrical shape of the engine's air inlet, combustors, fuel nozzles and injectors. Pyrodyne also built a model of the engine for testing.

As a consultant, Billig supported the Air Force HyTech technology program. The Air Force Research Laboratory (AFRL) initiated the Hypersonic Technology (HyTech) program in 1995 to maintain an aggressive technology development program in hypersonics after the National Aero-Space Plane's development was terminated. In 1996, Pratt & Whitney was awarded a $48-million contract for demonstration of a hydrocarbon-fueled scramjet engine. The near term application of this technology is a long range hypersonic cruise missile to defeat time-sensitive targets. In the far term, the scramjet technology enables a Mach 8-10 strike/reconnaissance aircraft and affordable, on-demand access to space with aircraft like operations. The HyTech scramjet will power the X-51 hypersonic test vehicle.

In 2006, Billig's business partner, Lance Jacobsen, formed a new company, GoHypersonic, in Dayton, Ohio, to continue the hypersonic research conducted by Pyrodyne. GoHypersonic inherited Billig's technical library.

== Death ==
Billig died on June 1, 2006. He was preceded in death by Peggy Billig, his wife of 50 years. He was survived by his four children: Linda Baumler and husband Robert, Donna Bartley and husband Dave, Fred Billig and wife Trish, and Jimmy Billig and wife Stephanie. He was also survived by ten grandchildren and two brothers.

== Honors ==
During his lifetime, Billig was honored with the Maryland Academy of Science's Distinguished Young Scientist Award (1966), the Combustion Institute's Silver Medal (1968), the NASP Pioneer Award (1989), and the JHU/APL lifetime achievement award (1991). In 1991 Billig, a Fellow, past Vice President, and Director of American Institute of Aeronautics and Astronautics (AIAA), also received AIAA's Dryden Research Lectureship for his lifetime of research. In 1992, he was awarded the M.M. Bondaruck Award “as a pioneer of scramjet research” by the Soviet Academy of Sciences and USSR Aviation Sport Federation. He received the Meritorious Civilian Service Award from the Department of the Air Force in 1992.

Billig was a founding member of the International Society on Air Breathing Engines (ISABE).

In 1995, Billig was elected to the National Academy of Engineering "for analytical and experimental contributions to supersonic/hypersonic combustion and ramjet engine technologies."

== Innovation Hall of Fame ==
Billig was inducted into the Innovation Hall of Fame in May 1997, for "pioneering work and outstanding contributions in the area of supersonic and hypersonic combustion."
