= Johns Hopkins Beast =

Mobile automaton

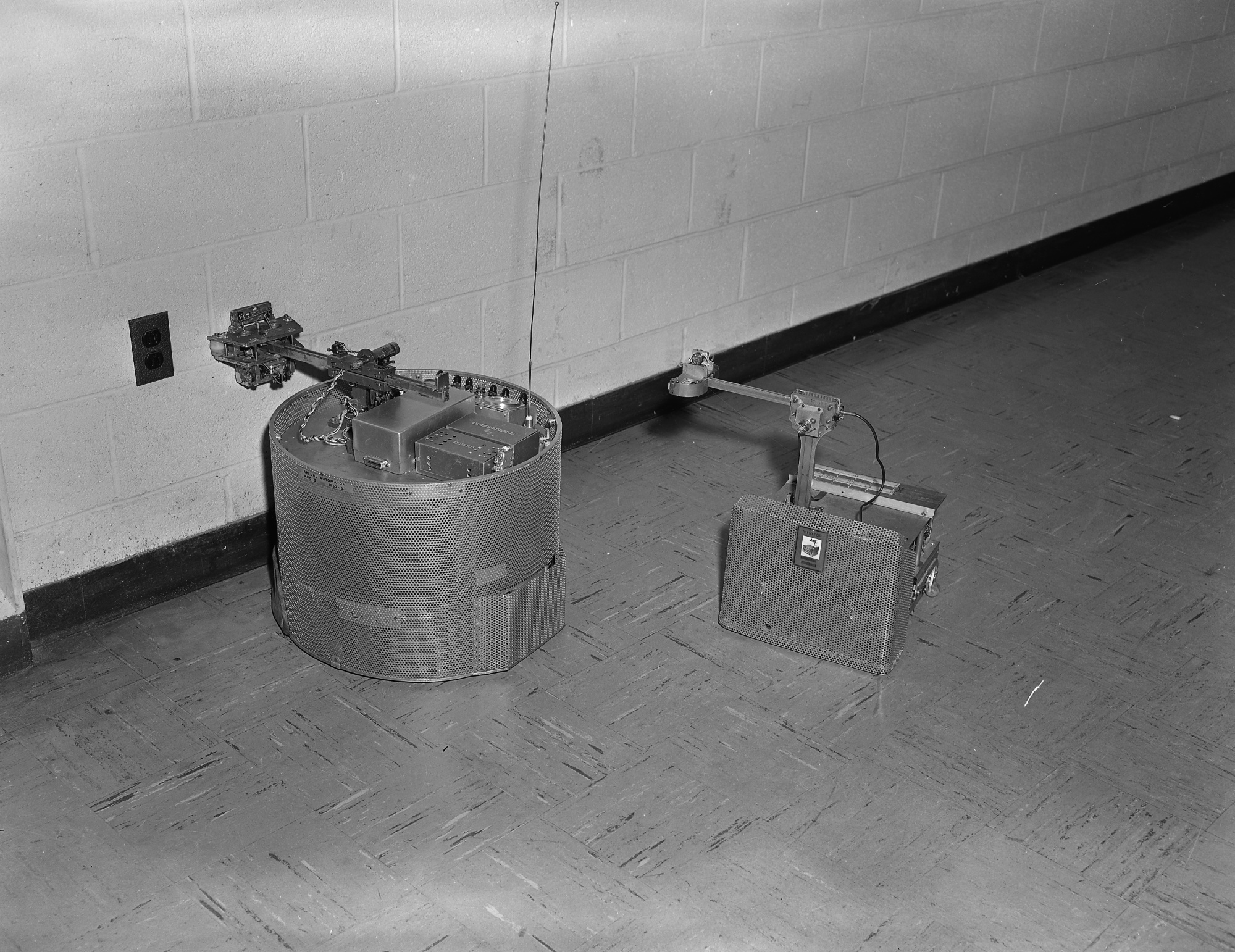
Johns Hopkins APL's early autonomous robot called "The Beast."

The Johns Hopkins Beast was a mobile automaton, an early pre-robot, built in the 1960s at the Johns Hopkins University Applied Physics Laboratory. The machine had a rudimentary intelligence and the ability to survive on its own. As it wandered through the white halls of the laboratory, it would seek black wall outlets. When it found one it would plug in and recharge.

The robot was cybernetic. It did not use a computer. Its control circuitry consisted of dozens of transistors controlling analog voltages. It used photocell optics and sonar to navigate. The 2N404 transistors were used to create NOR logic gates that implemented the Boolean logic to tell it what to do when a specific sensor was activated. The 2N404 transistors were also used to create timing gates to tell it how long to do something. 2N1040 Power transistors were used to control the power to the motion treads, the boom, and the charging mechanism.

The original sensors in Mod I were physical touch only. The wall socket was detected by physical switches on the arm that followed the wall. Once detected, two electrical prongs were extended until they entered the wall socket and made the electrical connection to charge the vehicle. The stairway, doors, and pipes on the hall wall were also detected by physical switches and recognized by appropriate logic.

The sonar guidance system was developed for Mod I and improved for Mod II. It used two ultrasonic transducers to determine distance, location within the halls, and obstructions in its path. This provided "The Beast" with bat-like guidance. At this point, it could detect obstructions in the hallway, such as people. Once an obstruction was detected, the Beast would slow down and then decide whether to stop or divert around the obstruction. It could also ultrasonically recognize the stairway and doorways to take appropriate action.

An optical guidance system was added to Mod II. This provided, among other capabilities, the ability to optically identify the black wall sockets that contrasted with the white wall.

The Hopkins Beast Autonomous Robot Mod II link below was written by Dr. Ronald McConnell, at that time a co-op student and one of the designers for Mod II.
