= Rob Strain =

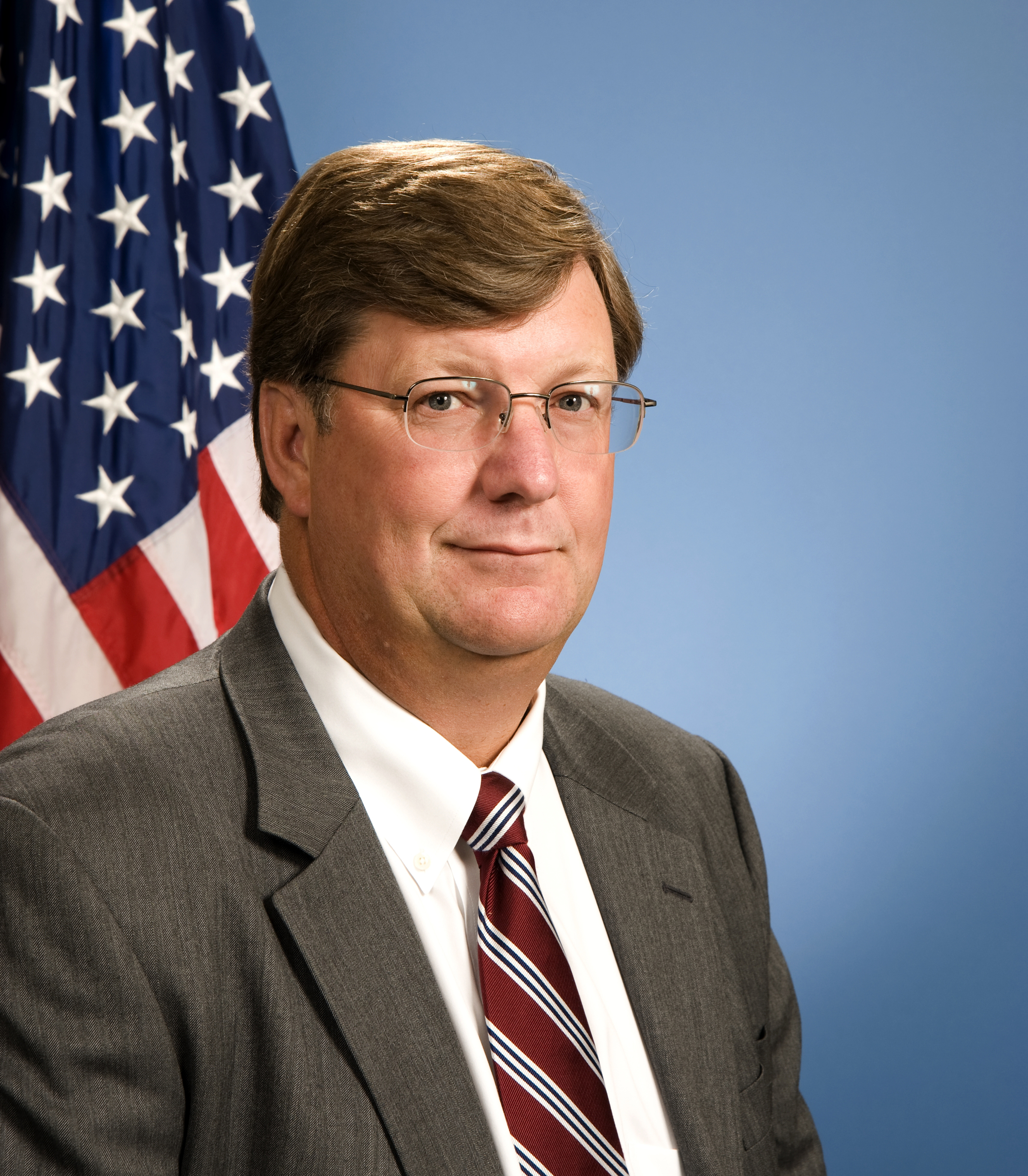
- Education: B.S. Western Michigan University
- Occupations: Former Director of NASA's Goddard Space Flight Center, Current President of Ball Aerospace & Technologies

Robert D. "Rob" Strain is the former Director of NASA's Goddard Space Flight Center. Strain held that post from August 4, 2008, through March 5, 2012. Strain announced in January 2012 that he will retire from NASA and return to private industry.

== Career ==
Prior to joining NASA, Strain was the head of the Space Department at the Johns Hopkins University Applied Physics Lab in Laurel, MD. Strain joined APL in 2004 as assistant Space Department head for operations. The following year, he was named associate department head and then became the department's managing executive.

He has more than 25 years of experience in the aerospace business, including executive positions at Orbital Sciences, where he led the company's Satellite and Electronic Sensors Divisions; and Fairchild Space and Defense Company, for which he served as chief financial officer and various other operational roles. He attended college at Western Michigan University and received his bachelor's degree in business administration.

In March 2012, Strain joined Ball Aerospace & Technologies as Chief Operating Officer. He served this role for one year, after which he became the President of the company. He has served as President since March 2013.
