= Semel =

Semel or Semels may refer to:

- David Semel, American film, television director and producer
- Harry Semels (1887–1946), American film actor
- Stephen Semel, American film editor, director and producer
- Terry Semel (born 1943), U.S. businessman, former chairman and chief executive officer of Yahoo! Incorporated
- Semel Institute for Neuroscience and Human Behavior, University of California, Los Angeles
- Semel District, Duhok Governorate, Iraqi Kurdistan region
- The Semel Editor ®, a semantics editor (i.e. not a text editor) for C++

== See also ==
- Simele (or Sumail), a town in the Kurdistan Region of Iraq
