= Curtis Stewart (American football) =

American football player (1963–1996)

No. 28
- Position: Running back

Personal information
- Born: June 4, 1963; Montgomery, Alabama, U.S.
- Died: July 3, 1996 (aged 33); Montgomery, Alabama, U.S.
- Listed height: 5 ft 11 in (1.80 m)
- Listed weight: 208 lb (94 kg)

Career information
- High school: Jefferson Davis (AL)
- College: Auburn
- NFL draft: 1988: undrafted

Career history
- Chicago Bears (1988); Dallas Cowboys (1989)
- Stats at Pro Football Reference

Curtis James Stewart (June 4, 1963 – July 3, 1996) was an American professional football running back in the National Football League (NFL) for the Chicago Bears and Dallas Cowboys. He played college football at Auburn University.

== Early life ==
Stewart attended Jefferson Davis High School. He posted 1,430 rushing yards and 19 touchdowns as a senior. He helped the team achieve a 10–0 regular season record and reach the state's 4A playoff semifinals.

He was a highly recruited football player in Alabama, but his grades didn't meet the NCAA's standards to receive a scholarship.

== College career ==
Stewart enrolled at Ferrum College to improve his grades. He was the team's leading rusher as a freshman, transferring at the end of the season to Auburn University.

As a sophomore, he didn't see much action in a team that had future NFL players Bo Jackson, Brent Fullwood, Tommie Agee and Tim Jessie at the running back position. As a junior, although he was listed as the third-string running back behind Jackson and Fullwood, he was used predominantly as a blocker, registering 37 carries for 199 yards and one touchdown.

In 1986, because of the talent level at the running back position, he was tried briefly at linebacker, before being redshirted to extend his college eligibility.

As a redshirt senior, the starter James Joseph cracked his left kneecap in September, opening the door for Stewart to be one of the players employed in a running back by committee approach. He was fifth on the team with 54 carries for 181 yards and 2 touchdowns. He scored 2 rushing touchdowns against Vanderbilt University. He finished his college career with 92 carries for 383 yards and 3 touchdowns.

== Professional career ==
On February 3, Stewart was signed as an undrafted free agent by the Chicago Bears after the 1988 NFL draft, to be used as a fullback. He was placed on the injured reserve list on August 23. He was released on September 4, 1989.

In October 1989, he was signed to the Dallas Cowboys' practice squad. On November 21, he was promoted to the active roster. He wasn't re-signed after the season.

== Coaching career and death ==
In 1992, Stewart was named a volunteer assistant coach and strength coach at Jefferson Davis High School, contributing to the team winning a state championship in 1996. On July 3, he died from injuries suffered in a traffic accident on U.S. Route 80, between Selma and Montgomery.
