= Brett Denevi =

Planetary geologist (born 1980)

Brett W. Denevi
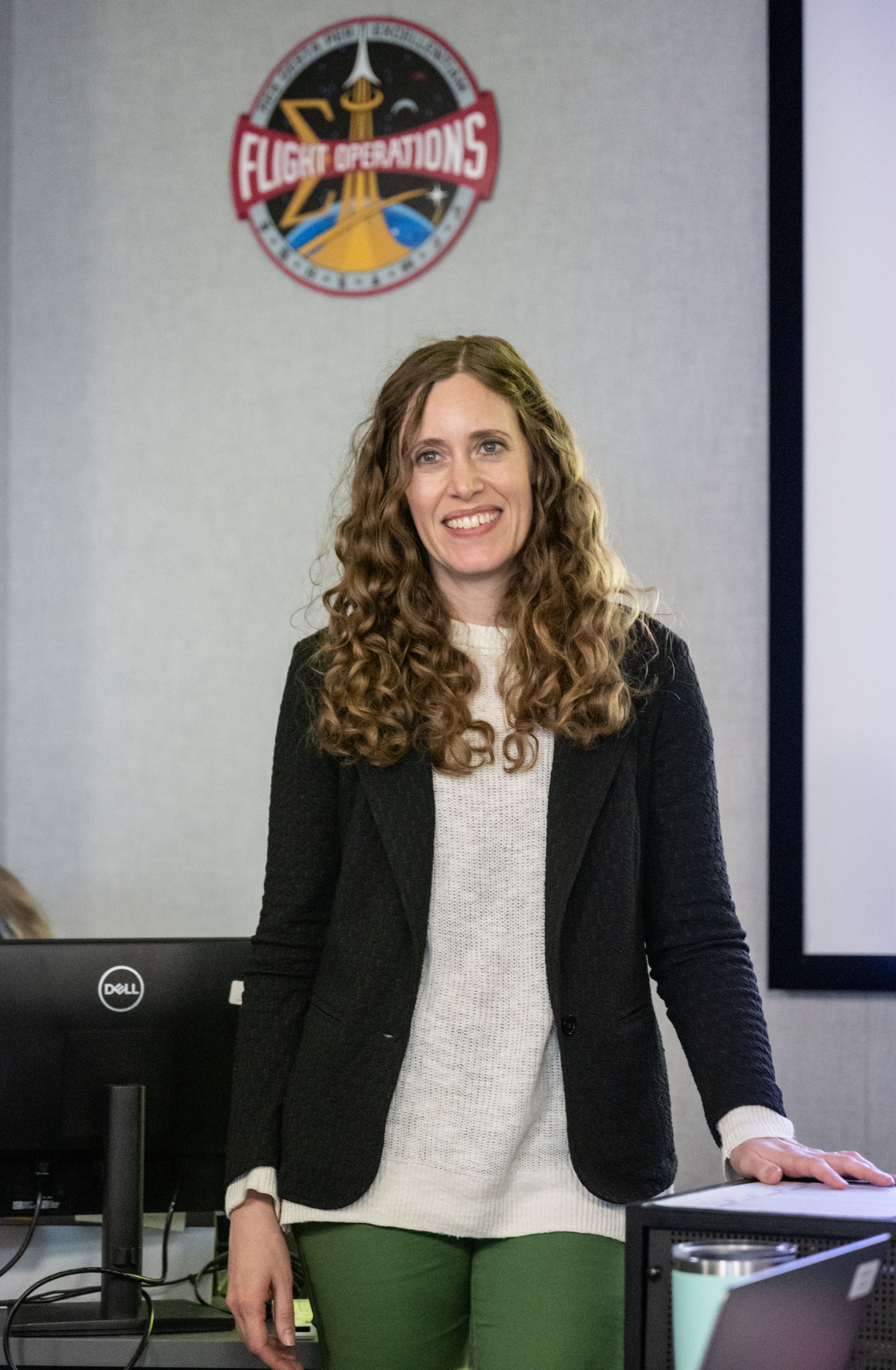
- Denevi in 2024
- Born: 1980 (age 45–46)
- Education: Northwestern University, University of Hawaiʻi
- Scientific career
- Workplaces: Arizona State University, Johns Hopkins University Applied Physics Laboratory

Brett W. Denevi (born 1980) is a Planetary Geologist at the Johns Hopkins Applied Physics Laboratory. She is currently serving as the Deputy Principal Investigator for the Lunar Reconnaissance Orbiter Camera. In 2014, Asteroid 9026 was named Denevi in her honor. She is the recipient of seven NASA group achievement awards and in 2014 she was awarded a NASA Early Career Fellowship. In 2015, she received a Maryland Academy of Sciences Outstanding Young Scientist Award.

== Career ==
She obtained her B.A. in Geological Sciences in 2002 from Northwestern University, and her Ph.D. in Geology and Geophysics in 2007 from the University of Hawaiʻi.

From 2007 to 2010 she was part of Arizona State University, where she served as the Deputy Instrument Scientist for the Mercury Dual Imaging System on board the MESSENGER spacecraft at Mercury leading the in-flight calibration and co-leading the Geology Discipline Group. Dr. Denevi was also a Participating Scientist on the Dawn mission at Vesta investigating pitted terrain and the presence of volatiles. She is a Planetary Geologist at the Johns Hopkins University Applied Physics Laboratory.

In an interview, she described her career as "following the traditional path". She also emphasized the need to "saying yes to the opportunities that you come across".

== Family ==
She has two children.

== Awards ==
2015	Maryland Academy of Sciences Outstanding Young Scientist
2015	NASA Group Achievement Award, LRO Extended Science Mission Team
2014	NASA Early Career Fellowship
2014	Asteroid 9026 Denevi named in honor
2013	NASA Group Achievement Award, Dawn Science Team
2013	NASA R. H. Goddard Exceptional Achievement for Science - Team, LRO Science Mission Team
2011	NASA Group Achievement Award, Lunar Reconnaissance Orbiter Exploration Mission
2011	NASA Group Achievement Award, LRO Mission Operations Team
2010	NASA Group Achievement Award, Lunar Reconnaissance Orbiter Team
2007	University of Hawaii Watumull Merit Scholarship
2002	Northwestern University Schlanger Undergraduate Earth Sciences Award

== Publications ==
- Denevi, B. W., M. S. Robinson, A. K. Boyd, D. T. Blewett, R. L. Klima (2016) The distribution and extent of lunar swirls, Icarus, 273, 53–67, doi:10.1016/j.icarus.2016.01.017.
- Denevi, B. W., M. S. Robinson, A. K. Boyd, H. Sato, B. W. Hapke, B. R. Hawke (2014) Characterization of space weathering from Lunar Reconnaissance Orbiter Camera ultraviolet observations of the Moon, Journal of Geophysical Research: Planets, 119, 967–997, doi:10.1002/2013JE004527.
- Denevi, B. W., C. M. Ernst, H. M. Meyer, M. S. Robinson, S. L. Murchie, J. L. Whitten, J. W. Head, T. R. Watters, S. C. Solomon, L. R. Ostrach, C. R. Chapman, P. K. Byrne, C. Klimczak, P. N. Peplowski (2013) The distribution and origin of smooth plains on Mercury, Journal of Geophysical Research: Planets, 118, 1–17, doi:10.1002/jgre.20075.
- Denevi, B. W., Blewett, D. T., Buczkowski, D. L., Capaccioni, F., Capria, M. T., De Sanctis, M. C., Garry, W. B., Gaskell, R. W., Le Corre, L., Li, J. -Y., Marchi, S., McCoy, T. J., Nathues, A., O'Brien, D. P., Petro, N. E., Pieters, C. M., Preusker, F., Raymond, C. A., Reddy, V., Russell, C. T., Schenk, P., Scully, J. E. C., Sunshine, J. M., Tosi, F., Williams, D. A., Wyrick, D., (2012), Pitted Terrain on Vesta and Implications for the Presence of Volatiles, Science, 338, 246–249.
- Denevi, Brett W., Koeber, Steven D., Robinson, Mark S., Garry, W. Brent, Hawke, B. Ray, Tran, Thanh N., Lawrence, Samuel J., Keszthelyi, Laszlo P., Barnouin, Olivier S., Ernst, Carolyn M., Tornabene, Livio L., (2012), Physical constraints on impact melt properties from Lunar Reconnaissance Orbiter Camera images, Icarus, 219, 665–675.
- Denevi, Brett W., Robinson, Mark S., Solomon, Sean C., Murchie, Scott L., Blewett, David T., Domingue, Deborah L., McCoy, Timothy J., Ernst, Carolyn M., Head, James W., Watters, Thomas R., Chabot, Nancy L., (2009), The Evolution of Mercury's Crust: A Global Perspective from MESSENGER, Science, 324, 613–618.
- Denevi, B. W., Lucey, P. G., Sherman, S. B., (2008), Radiative transfer modeling of near-infrared spectra of lunar mare soils: Theory and measurement, Journal of Geophysical Research-Planets, 113.
- Denevi, B. W., Robinson, M. S., (2008), Mercury's albedo from Mariner 10: Implications for the presence of ferrous iron, Icarus, 197, 239–246.
- Denevi, B. W., Lucey, P. G., Hochberg, E. J., Steutel, D., (2007), Near-infrared optical constants of pyroxene as a function of iron and calcium content, Journal of Geophysical Research-Planets, 112.
