= Ralph Semmel =

American engineer and computer scientist

Ralph D. Semmel
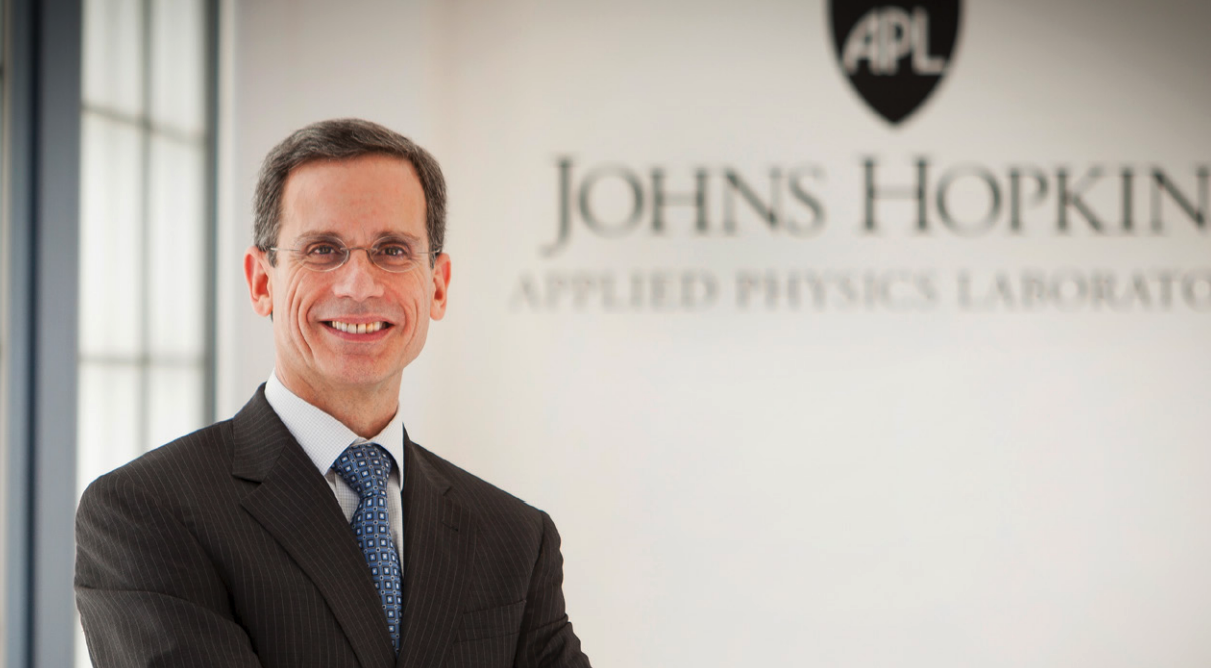
- Scientific career
- Fields: Engineering, Computer Science
- Institutions: Johns Hopkins Applied Physics Laboratory

Ralph D. Semmel is an American engineer and computer scientist. He was the eighth director of the Johns Hopkins Applied Physics Laboratory (APL) in Laurel, Maryland, from 2010 to 2025

== Biography ==
A native of Monroe, New York, Semmel earned a Bachelor of Science degree in engineering from the United States Military Academy at West Point, a Master of Science degree in systems management from the University of Southern California, a Master of Science degree in computer science from Johns Hopkins University and a Ph.D. in computer science from the University of Maryland, Baltimore County.

== Career ==
Before joining APL, Semmel held leadership and technical positions with Wang Laboratories and the MITRE Corporation. He joined APL in 1986 after serving in the U.S. Army.

From 1997 to 2010, Semmel was chair of Computer Science, Information Assurance, and Information Systems Engineering graduate programs for Johns Hopkins University's Whiting School of Engineering’s ‘Engineering for Professionals’ program.

In 2017, Semmel was named an "International Business Leader" by the World Trade Institute. In 2017, Semmel was a commencement speaker for the University of Maryland, Baltimore and received an honorary Doctor of Science degree. On May 24, 2019, Semmel delivered the commencement speech and received an honorary associate of arts degree at Howard Community College. The Daily Record recognized Semmel as an "Influential Marylander" in an issue released March 29, 2019 and as a top 30 "Power in Higher Education" in 2022.

Under Semmel's leadership, the Lab had a wide variety of accomplishments, including the successful Pluto flyby of APL-built New Horizons, the data modeling for the Johns Hopkins Coronavirus Research Center and the successful Double Asteroid Redirection Test, which was the world's first planetary defense test mission. Semmel's leadership also saw APL selected multiple times as one of Fast Company's Best Workplaces for Innovators and ComputerWorld's Top 10 Best Places to Work in IT.

In July 2024, Semmel announced that he would be stepping down from his role as director of APL in 2025, after almost 40 years at the Lab. He is the second-longest-serving head of the Lab, trailing only its third director, Ralph Gibson.

In 2025, he joined the Riverside Research Board of Trustees. In 2026, Semmel was elected as a member of the National Academy of Engineering.

== Research ==
Semmel has published papers in artificial intelligence, database systems, and software engineering. His published works include research on a prototype query tool for the U.S. Army, automated query formation using an entity-relationship conceptual schema and a prototype interface that would allow better data retrieval from the Hubble Telescope. Semmel also researched how to include context into conceptual schema, integrated reengineered databases to support data fusion, knowledge-based information access and spacecraft distributed modeling and simulation.

While at the University of Maryland: Baltimore County, Semmel's dissertation discussed automated query formulation.

Semmel also served as the co-chair for the Defense Science Board's task force report on Next-Generation Unmanned Undersea Systems. He has also served on the U.S. Strategic Command Strategic Advisory Group and various panels on the National Security Agency (NSA) advisory board. He is currently a member of the Council on Foreign Relations.
